= Elbe–Weser triangle =

Region in Germany

Coordinates: 53°50′N 8°24′E

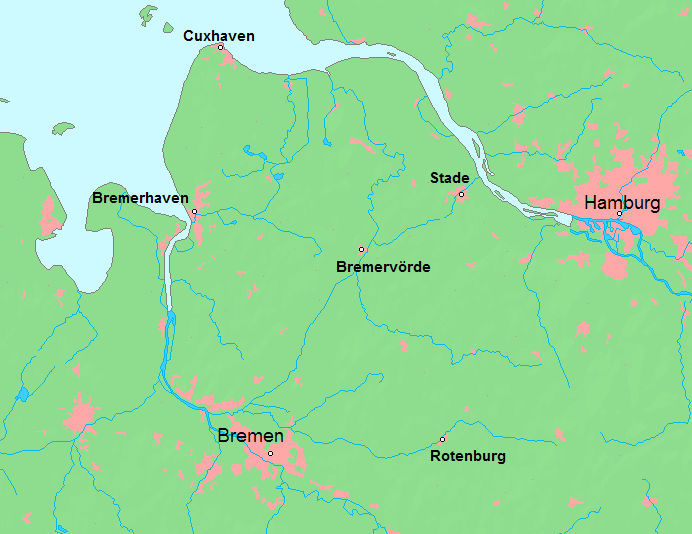
Map of the Elbe–Weser triangle

The region between the Elbe and Weser rivers (the triangle of Bremen, Hamburg, and Cuxhaven) forms the Elbe–Weser triangle (German: Elbe-Weser-Dreieck; Northern Low Saxon: Elv-Werser-Dreeeck), also rendered Elbe-Weser Triangle, in northern Germany. It is also colloquially referred to as the Nasses Dreieck or "wet triangle".

The Elbe–Weser triangle is a geographical region and, historically and politically, corresponds roughly to the former territory of Bremen-Verden and formed the major part of the former Stade Region. Today the Elbe–Weser triangle belongs to Lower Saxony outside the borders of the Hanseatic cities. The Stade Regional Association (Landschaftsverband Stade) operates within the Elbe–Weser triangle as a regional cultural organisation.

== Political divisions ==
=== State of Lower Saxony ===
- Landkreis Cuxhaven
- Landkreis Stade
- Landkreis Osterholz
- Landkreis Rotenburg (Wümme) (partially)
- Landkreis Verden (partially)

=== Free Hanseatic city of Bremen ===
- Bremen (major part)
- Bremerhaven

=== Free and Hanseatic city of Hamburg ===
- Hamburg (minor parts)

== Terrain and geology ==
The terrain is largely flat and comprises mudflats, marsh, bog and geest, mainly the Stade Geest. Other areas are characterised by partially dried out bog, such as the Teufelsmoor or the Altes Land and raised bogs, like the Ahlenmoor, Langes Moor, Hymenmoor and Königsmoor, with peat layers of two to six metres. Typical of the scenery are broad ridges of geest, often covered with pine or mixed woods, heathland and natural rivers such as the Oste, Geeste, Lower Elbe, Lune, Hamme or the Wümme. In the northern part of the area the only ridge is the Wingst, up to 74 metres (243 ft) high.

The basis of the terrain is largely formed from the moraines and meltwater deposits of the Saalian glaciation, the penultimate glaciation period of the pleistocene era. These have created the sand ridges of the geest with their typical glacial erratic boulders of granite and gneiss. The end moraines of the last ice age (Weichselian ice age) did not reach this area. The contours of the land are much softer and flatter than, e.g. in the Holstein Switzerland.

== Transport ==
The Elbe–Weser triangle is served by 3 motorways: the A 1 (Bremen–Hamburg), A 26 (Stade–Horneburg) and A 27 (Walsrode−Verden (Aller)–Bremen–Bremerhaven–Cuxhaven). In addition there is a dense network of federal roads, the Bundesstraßen.

There are various railway links such as the Rollbahn main line from Bremen via Rotenburg (Wümme) to Hamburg, the Weser-Aller Line from Rotenburg via Verden to Minden, the Lower Elbe Railway from Hamburg to Cuxhaven and the Bremerhaven–Cuxhaven, Bremerhaven–Buxtehude (–Hamburg), Bremerhaven–Bremen and Bremen–Verden–Hanover railways.

There are sea ports in Bremerhaven, Bremen, Cuxhaven and Bützfleth. Inland shipping is able to use the rivers Aller, Oste and several canals; the Weser and Elbe can also be used by sea-going vessels.

Regional airports and airfields are located at Bremerhaven-Luneort, Nordholz, Rotenburg-Luhne and Hellwege.

Canals include the Elbe–Weser shipping channel.

== Towns and villages ==
Achim, Anderlingen, Agathenburg, Ahlerstedt, Alfstedt, Apensen, Appeln, Armstorf, Aschwarden, Axstedt, Bad Bederkesa, Bargstedt, Basdahl, Beckdorf, Belum, Beverstedt, Bliedersdorf, Bokel, Bothel, Bramstedt, Breddorf, Bremen-Borgfeld, Bremen-Blumenthal, Bremen-Burglesum, Bremen-Nord, Bremen-Vegesack, Bremerhaven, Bremervörde, Brest, Bülkau, Bülstedt, Buxtehude, Cadenberge, Cappel, Cuxhaven, Deinste, Deinstedt, Dollern, Dorum, Drangstedt, Driftsethe, Drochtersen, Düdenbüttel, Ebersdorf, Elmlohe, Elsdorf, Engelschoff, Farven, Fintel, Fischerhude, Flögeln, Fredenbeck, Frelsdorf, Garlstedt, Geversdorf, Geestenseth, Gnarrenburg, Grasberg, Großenwörden, Grünendeich, Guderhandviertel, Gyhum, Hagen, Hambergen, Harsefeld, Harriersand, Hammah, Hechthausen, Heilshorn, Hemmoor, Heerstedt, Hepstedt, Heeslingen, Himmelpforten, Hipstedt, Hollern-Twielenfleth, Hollen, Hollnseth, Holste, Horneburg, Ihlienworth, Jork, Kirchtimke, Kirchwistedt, Köhlen, Kuhstedt, Kutenholz, Lamstedt, Langen, Langwedel, Lauenbrück, Lilienthal, Lintig, Lübberstedt, Loxstedt, Lunestedt, Midlum, Mittelnkirchen, Mittelstenahe, Mulsum, Nordholz, Neuhaus (Oste), Neuenkirchen, Nordleda, Nottensdorf, Oberndorf, Odisheim, Oerel, Ohlenstedt, Osterbruch, Osterholz-Scharmbeck, Ostereistedt, Osten, Otterndorf, Ottersberg, Oyten, Padingbüttel, Rade, Rhade, Ringstedt, Ritterhude, Sandbostel, Sandstedt, Sauensiek, Scharmbeckstotel, Schiffdorf, Schwanewede, Seedorf, Sellstedt, Selsingen, Sottrum, Spaden, Stade, Steinau, Steinkirchen, Stinstedt, Stotel, Stubben, Tarmstedt, Uthlede, Vorwerk, Vollersode, Wanna, Wehdel, Westertimke, Wilstedt, Wingst, Worpswede, Wremen, Wulsbüttel, Zeven.

== Regions ==
- Altes Land
- Bremen Switzerland
- Land Hadeln
- Land Wursten
- Kehdingen
- Osterholz Geest
- Stade Geest
- Teufelsmoor
- Wingst
- Wümme Depression

== Historic territories ==
- Diocese and Archdiocese of (Hamburg-)Bremen (787-1180)
- Prince-Bishopric of Verden (1180–1648)
- Prince-Archbishopric of Bremen (1180-1648)
- Land of Wursten (1180–1524)
- Land of Hadeln (1296–1807 and 1814–1823)
- Duchy of Bremen (1648–1807 and 1814–1823), better known as part of Bremen-Verden
- Principality of Verden (1648–1807 and 1814–1823), better known as part of Bremen-Verden
- Westphalian Department of the Elbe and Weser Mouth (1810–1811)
- French département Bouches-de-l'Elbe (1811–1814)
- French département Bouches-du-Weser (1811–1814)
- Stade Region (1823–1978)

== Archaeology ==
In the Triangle, with its geest, moorland and bogs, there are large numbers of monuments and reminders of prehistoric and early historic and more recent historic times. These include:

- Fortifications (Heidenschanze, Holzurburg, Monsilienburg, Rosenburg)
- Castles (Altenwalde, Pipinsburg)
- Tumuli or barrows
- Megalith sites: long barrows, rectangular dolmens, passage graves (Hohensteine, Grundoldendorf, Hünenstein, Deinste)
- Cists (Hagenah, Heerstedt, Flögeln)
- Wurts (Feddersen Wierde)
- the Gravenberg and Wanhödener Berg are mounds whose purpose has not been researched.

== Places of interest ==
- Historische Altstadt in Stade
- Deutscher Olymp in der Wingst
- Worpswede and Fischerhude artists' colonies on the edge of the Teufelsmoor
- Moor Express between Osterholz-Scharmbeck, Gnarrenburg and Bremervörde
- Transporter bridge over the Oste
- Alte Liebe in Cuxhaven
- The Ahlenmoor

== Sources ==
- Landschaftsverband Stade: Geschichte des Landes zwischen Elbe und Weser: Band 1: Vor- und Frühgeschichte. Stade, 1995, 361 pp., ISBN 3-9801919-7-4
- Landschaftsverband Stade: Geschichte des Landes zwischen Elbe und Weser: Band 2: Mittelalter (einschl. Kunstgeschichte). Stade, 1995, 534 pp., ISBN 3-9801919-8-2
- Hans-Georg Trüper: Ritter und Knappen zwischen Weser und Elbe - Die Ministerialität des Erzstifts Bremen. 1178 pages, Vol. 12. In Schriftenreihe des Landschaftsverbandes Stade. Stade, 2000, ISBN 3-931879-05-4
- Hans-Eckhard Dannenberg, Norbert Fischer, Franklin Kopitzsch (eds.): Land am Fluss - Beiträge zur Regionalgeschichte der Niederelbe. Published by the regional association of the former Duchies of Bremen and Verden, Stade, 2006, 252 pp., ISBN 3-931879-20-8.
- Johannes Göhler: Wege des Glaubens - Beiträge zu einer Kirchengeschichte des Landes zwischen Elbe und Weser. Published by the regional association of the former Duchies of Bremen and Verden, Stade, 2006, 343 pp., ISBN 978-3-931879-26-6.
- Claudia Bei der Wieden: Erinnerungszeichen. Historische Grabmale zwischen Elbe und Weser (1231 - 1900). Published by the regional association of the former Duchies of Bremen and Verden, Stade, 2005. ISBN 3-931879-18-6
- Brage Bei der Wieden und Jan Lokers (eds.): Lebensläufe zwischen Elbe und Weser - Ein biographisches Lexikon, Vol. 1. 362 pages, Vol. 16 in der Schriftenreihe des Landschaftsverbandes Stade. Stade, 2002, ISBN 3-931879-08-9
