= Am Dobrock =

- Samtgemeinde
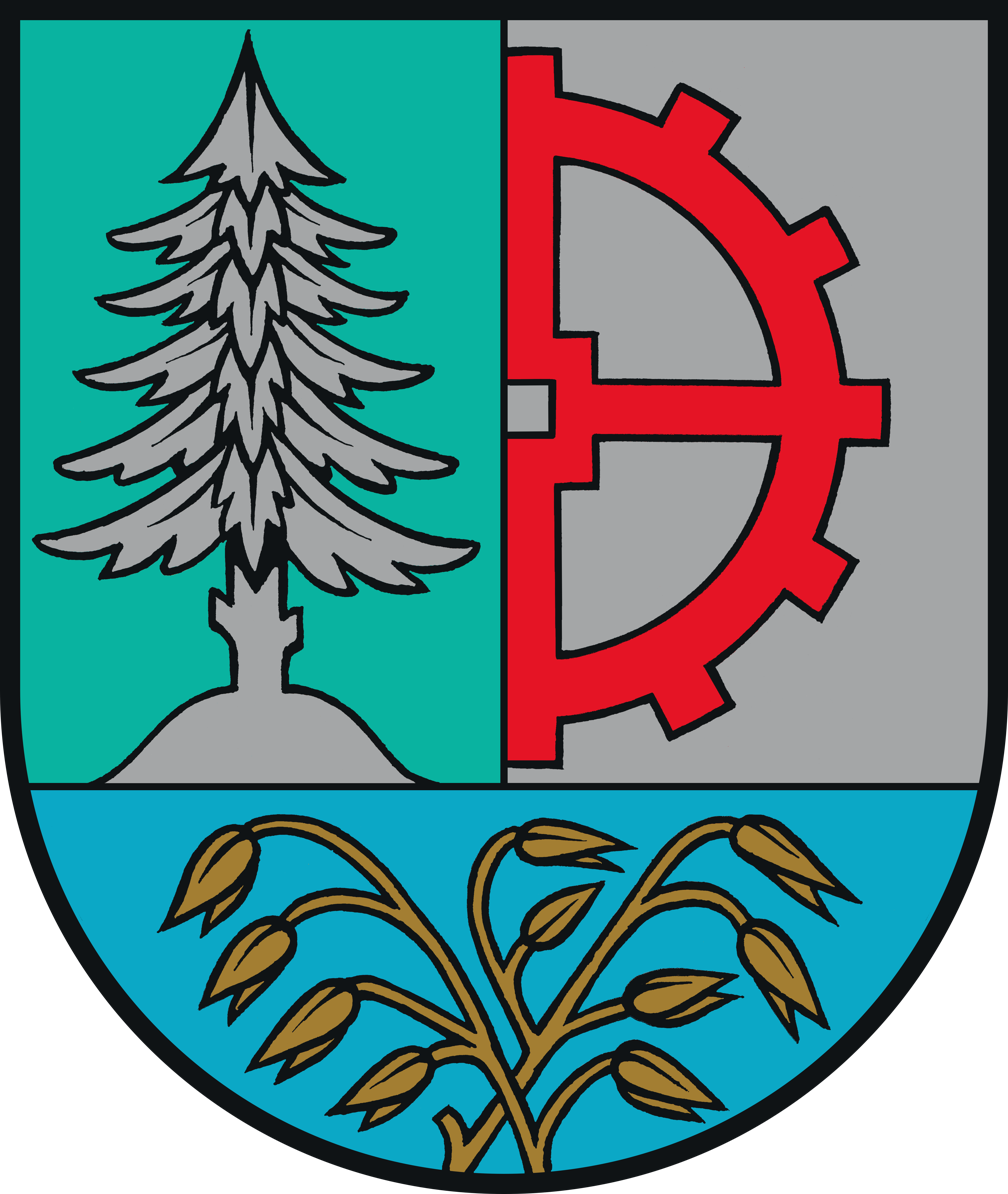
- Coat of arms
- Interactive map of Am Dobrock
- Location within Germany Location within Lower Saxony
- Coordinates: 53°46′15″N 09°03′30″E
- Country: Germany
- State: Lower Saxony
- District: Cuxhaven
- Disbanded: 1 November 2016
- Subdivisions: 7 municipalities

Area
  - Total: 178.11 km^{2} (68.77 sq mi)
- Elevation: 5 m (16 ft)

Population (2015-12-31)
  - Total: 11,807
  - Density: 66.290/km^{2} (171.69/sq mi)
- Time zone: UTC+01:00 (CET)
  - Summer (DST): UTC+02:00 (CEST)
- Postal codes: 21781
- Dialling codes: 04777
- Vehicle registration: CUX
- Website: www.am-dobrock.de

Am Dobrock is a former Samtgemeinde ("collective municipality") in the district of Cuxhaven, in Lower Saxony, Germany. It is situated near the confluence of the rivers Oste and Elbe, approx. 25 km east of Cuxhaven, and 15 km south of Brunsbüttel. Its seat is in the village Cadenberge. On 1 November 2016 it was merged into the Samtgemeinde Land Hadeln.

The Samtgemeinde Am Dobrock consisted of the following municipalities:

- Belum
- Bülkau
- Cadenberge
- Geversdorf
- Neuhaus (Oste)
- Oberndorf
- Wingst
