= Neuhaus (Oste) =

Neuhaus an der Oste
- Municipality
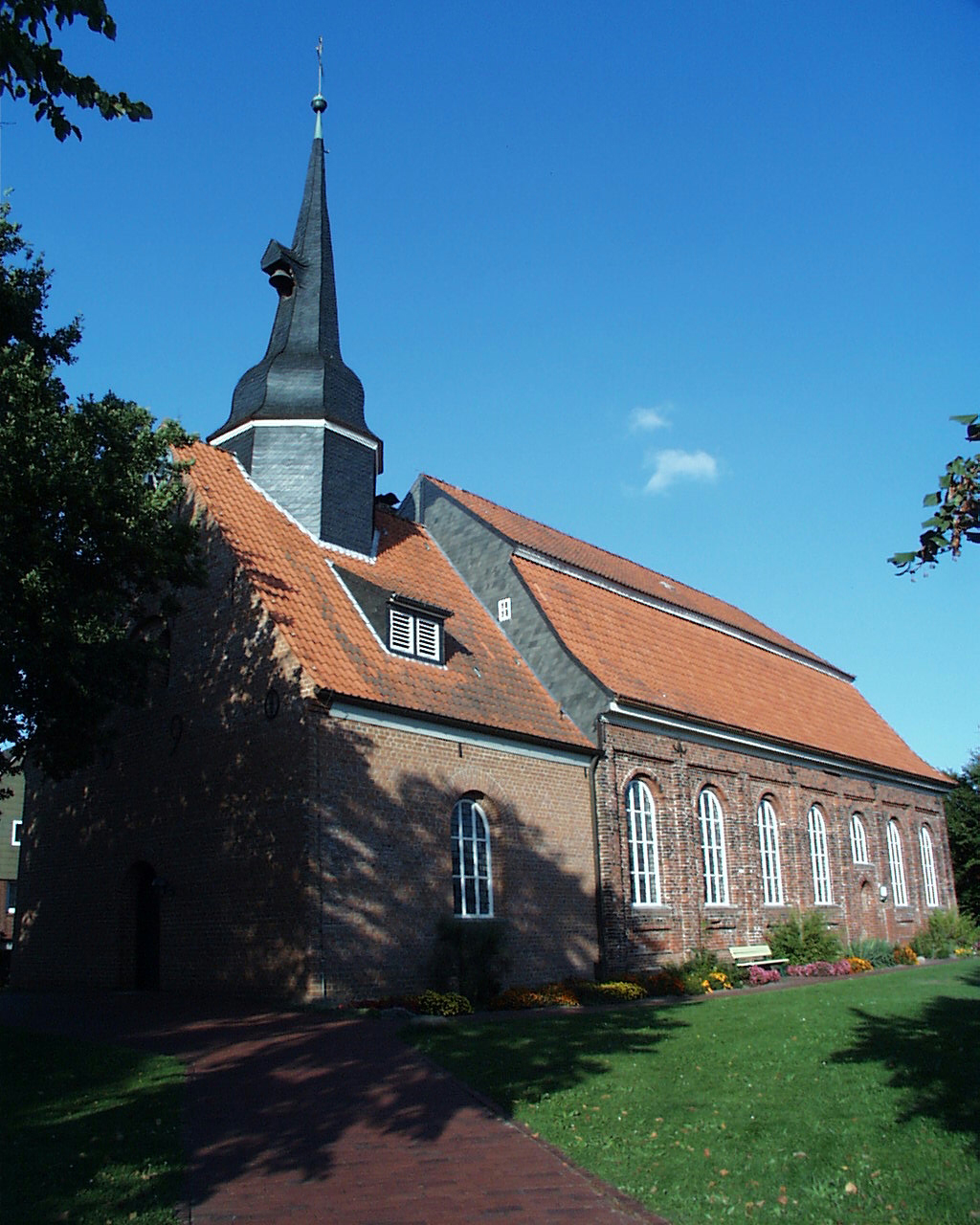
- Evangelical Lutheran Emmaus Church

- Flag Coat of arms

- Location of Neuhaus an der Oste within Cuxhaven district
- Interactive map of Neuhaus an der Oste
- Location within Germany Location within Lower Saxony
- Coordinates: 53°48′N 09°02′E
- Country: Germany
- State: Lower Saxony
- District: Cuxhaven
- Municipal assoc.: Land Hadeln

Government
  - Mayor: Georg Martens (CDU)

Area
  - Total: 9.86 km^{2} (3.81 sq mi)
- Elevation: 2 m (6.6 ft)

Population (2025-12-31)
  - Total: 1,045
  - Density: 106/km^{2} (274/sq mi)
- Time zone: UTC+01:00 (CET)
  - Summer (DST): UTC+02:00 (CEST)
- Postal codes: 21785
- Dialling codes: 04752
- Vehicle registration: CUX
- Website: www.gemeinde-neuhaus-oste.de

Neuhaus an der Oste (in High German, in Low Saxon: Neehuus) is a municipality in the district of Cuxhaven, in Lower Saxony, Germany.

== History ==
The area of today's Neuhaus belonged to the Prince-Archbishopric of Bremen, established in 1180. In 1371 Prince-Archbishop Albert II's bailiff in Vörde erected the fortress Slikborch near today's Neuhaus at the mouth of the river Aue into the Oste, shortly before it empties into the Elbe, as a stronghold to wield power over the Land of Kehdingen and to gain a stake in the neighbouring Saxe-Lauenburgian exclave Land of Hadeln. In 1387 the free peasants from Hadeln and Kehdingen demolished the fortress Slikborch as a threat to their autonomy.

In 1404 Prince-Archbishop Otto II erected a new fortress on the right bank of the Aue, then named "dat Nygehus" (the new house), becoming the eponym for the place. However, the peasants again also destroyed this fortress in 1420. The peasants of the neighbouring municipalities forged an alliance against a new fortress in 1423. In 1435 Prince-Archbishop Baldwin II commissioned the construction of a new fortress now called castle or mansion, although his pre-predecessor had pledged not to erect another fortress. Peasants of Hadeln, Kehdingen, and Wursten attacked the fortress several times in the 15th and 16th century.

Under Prince-Archbishop Christopher the Spendthrift a number of villages tried to separate from the Prince-Archbishopric of Bremen in favour of neighbouring Saxe-Lauenburgian Hadeln. This resulted in a war between Christopher and Duke Magnus I of Saxe-Lauenburg. However, Christopher successfully suppressed the separatists and Magnus and Christopher confirmed the status quo ante bellum of the villages by a treaty in 1516. Duke Magnus, however, broke the contract and ravaged villages in the prince-archbishopric, including the fortress in Neuhaus. The castle was soon restored but around 1540 Christopher the Spendthrift pawned it with all its dues to levy to Johann von Münchhausen for 4,000 gold guilders. In 1544 the estates of the prince-archbishopric agreed to levy an extra tax to redeem the pawns in return for Christopher's moderation of his prodigality.

On 9 June 1547 Count Albrecht von Mansfeld, commander of the Protestant forces in the Smalkaldic War, captured the fortress. By this time the inhabitants adopted Lutheranism, also as a form of opposition against the spendthrift Prince-Archbishop Christopher, who broke contracts with the estates of the prince-archbishopric and acted against its constitution. However, in 1548 prince-archiepiscopal troops reconquered the castle, which now served as an important outpost of the ruler. A bailiff (first in German: Vogt, then Amtmann and at last Drost) represented the prince-archbishop in Neuhaus and its environs, including the parishes of Belum, Bülkau, Cadenberge, Geversdorf, Kehdingbruch (a part of today's Belum), Oberndorf, and Oppeln (a part of today's Wingst).

During the Leaguist occupation under Tilly (1628–1630) in the course of the Thirty Years' War, the inhabitants of Neuhaus suffered from attempts of re-Catholicisation. The war ended by the Peace of Westphalia in 1648, by which the ecclesiastical Prince-Archbishopric was transformed into the secular Duchy of Bremen, which was first ruled in personal union by the Swedish crown – interrupted by a Danish occupation (1712–1715) – and from 1715 on by the House of Hanover. In the 18th century the fortress finally fell into decay and was torn down. Today its former site is indicated by a hill, now covered by the Schlosspark (castle park) with a war memorial.

In 1807 the ephemeric Kingdom of Westphalia annexed the duchy, before France annexed it in 1810. In 1813 the duchy was restored to the Electorate of Hanover, which – after its upgrade to the Kingdom of Hanover in 1814 – incorporated the duchy in a real union and the ducal territory, including Neuhaus, became part of the Hanoveran Stade Region, established in 1823.

== Past residents ==
- Louis Rose (1807–1888) was born in Neuhaus a.d. Oste and later in his life (1850) became the pioneer Jewish settler of San Diego, California, where Rose Canyon, Rose Creek and Roseville all are named for him. He served in various civic capacities, including chairman of the city Board of Trustees, member of the county Board of Supervisors, School Board member, Grand Jury member and Postmaster.
