= Hadeln =

- Samtgemeinde
- Coat of arms

- Location of Hadeln within Cuxhaven district
- Interactive map of Hadeln
- Location within Germany Location within Lower Saxony
- Coordinates: 53°49′N 8°54′E
- Country: Germany
- State: Lower Saxony
- District: Cuxhaven
- Founded: 1970-01-01
- Disbanded: 2010-12-31
- Subdivisions: 4

Area
  - Total: 84.69 km^{2} (32.70 sq mi)

Population (2009-12-31)
  - Total: 10,190
  - Density: 120.3/km^{2} (311.6/sq mi)
- Time zone: UTC+01:00 (CET)
  - Summer (DST): UTC+02:00 (CEST)

Hadeln is a former Samtgemeinde ("collective municipality") in the district of Cuxhaven, in Lower Saxony, Germany. It was situated in the Land of Hadeln near the mouth of the river Elbe, approximately 15 km east of Cuxhaven. Its seat was in the town Otterndorf. On 1 January 2011 it merged with the Samtgemeinde Sietland to form the new Samtgemeinde Land Hadeln.

The Samtgemeinde Hadeln consisted of the following municipalities:

1. Neuenkirchen
2. Nordleda
3. Osterbruch
4. Otterndorf
