= Steinau =

Steinau can refer to:

- Steinau an der Straße, a town in Hesse, Germany
- Steinau, Lower Saxony, a town in Lower Saxony, Germany
- Steinau an der Oder, the German name for Ścinawa, a town in southwestern Poland
- Steinau, the German name for Stonava, a village in the Czech Republic
- Two tributaries of the Sieber in Osterode am Harz district in Germany:
  - Große Steinau
  - Kleine Steinau
- The Silesian Duchy of Steinau
