= Wanna =

Wanna may refer to:

Places

- Wanna, Pakistan, a city in South Waziristan, Pakistan
- Wanna, Germany

Other

- Wanna (Dune), a minor character from Frank Herbert's novel Dune
- "Wanna" (song), a single by Korean girl group Kara.
- Relaxed pronunciation of "want to" or "want a"
