= Ihlienworth =

Ihlienworth Helmworth (Low Saxon)
- Municipality
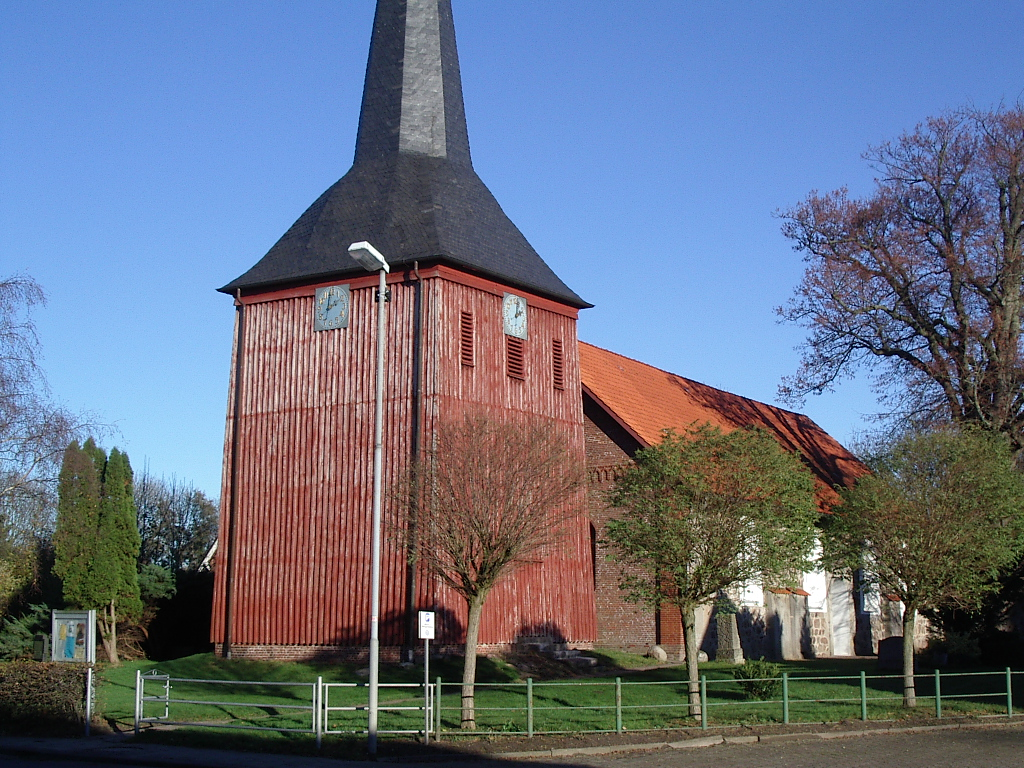
- Evangelical Lutheran St. Willehadus Church (St. Wilhadi)

- Flag Coat of arms

- Location of Ihlienworth within Cuxhaven district
- Interactive map of Ihlienworth
- Location within Germany Location within Lower Saxony
- Coordinates: 53°44′N 08°55′E
- Country: Germany
- State: Lower Saxony
- District: Cuxhaven
- Municipal assoc.: Land Hadeln

Government
  - Mayor: Hannelore Blohm (CDU)

Area
  - Total: 40.29 km^{2} (15.56 sq mi)
- Elevation: 1 m (3.3 ft)

Population (2025-12-31)
  - Total: 1,502
  - Density: 37.28/km^{2} (96.55/sq mi)
- Time zone: UTC+01:00 (CET)
  - Summer (DST): UTC+02:00 (CEST)
- Postal codes: 21775
- Dialling codes: 04755
- Vehicle registration: CUX
- Website: www.sietland.de

Ihlienworth (in High German, in Low Saxon: Helmworth) is a municipality in the district of Cuxhaven, in Lower Saxony, Germany.

== History ==
Ihlienworth belongs to the Land of Hadeln, first an exclave of the younger Duchy of Saxony and after its de facto dynastic partition in 1296 of the Duchy of Saxe-Lauenburg, established de jure in 1260. When in 1689 the ducal dynasty died out in the male line, Ihlienworth - like all the Land of Hadeln - came into imperial custody. In 1728 Emperor Charles VI enfeoffed George II Augustus and his House of Hanover in personal union with the reverted fief of Saxe-Lauenburg.

By a redeployment of Hanoverian territories in 1731 the Hanoverian Duchies of Bremen and Verden were conveyed the administration of the neighbouring Land of Hadeln. In 1807 the ephemeric Kingdom of Westphalia annexed the duchy, before France annexed it in 1810. In 1813 the duchy was restored to the Electorate of Hanover, which - after its upgrade to the Kingdom of Hanover in 1814 - incorporated the duchy in a real union and the ducal territory, including Ihlienworth, became part of the new Stade Region, established in 1823.
