= Mittelstenahe =

- Municipality
- Coat of arms

- Location of Mittelstenahe within Cuxhaven district
- Interactive map of Mittelstenahe
- Location within Germany Location within Lower Saxony
- Coordinates: 53°39′02″N 09°02′11″E
- Country: Germany
- State: Lower Saxony
- District: Cuxhaven
- Municipal assoc.: Börde Lamstedt
- Subdivisions: 3 Ortsteile

Government
  - Mayor: Günter Helck

Area
  - Total: 33.68 km^{2} (13.00 sq mi)
- Elevation: 15 m (49 ft)

Population (2025-12-31)
  - Total: 575
  - Density: 17.1/km^{2} (44.2/sq mi)
- Time zone: UTC+01:00 (CET)
  - Summer (DST): UTC+02:00 (CEST)
- Postal codes: 21770
- Dialling codes: 04771, 04773
- Vehicle registration: CUX
- Website: www.mittelstenahe.de

Mittelstenahe is a municipality in the district of Cuxhaven, in Lower Saxony, Germany.

== History ==
Mittelstenahe belonged to the Prince-Archbishopric of Bremen, established in 1180. The farmers were tithing to the Himmelpforten Convent, secularised in 1647. In 1648 the Prince-Archbishopric was transformed into the Duchy of Bremen, which was first ruled in personal union by the Swedish Crown - interrupted by a Danish occupation (1712–1715) - and from 1715 on by the Hanoverian Crown.

After a Prussian and then French occupation from 1806 to 1810, the ephemeric Kingdom of Westphalia annexed the Duchy, before France annexed it with effect of 1 January 1811. In 1813 the Duchy was restored to the Electorate of Hanover, which - after its upgrade to the Kingdom of Hanover in 1814 - incorporated the Duchy in a real union and the Ducal territory, including Mittelstenahe, became part of the new Stade Region, established in 1823.
