= Neuenkirchen, Cuxhaven =

Neuenkirchen
- Municipality
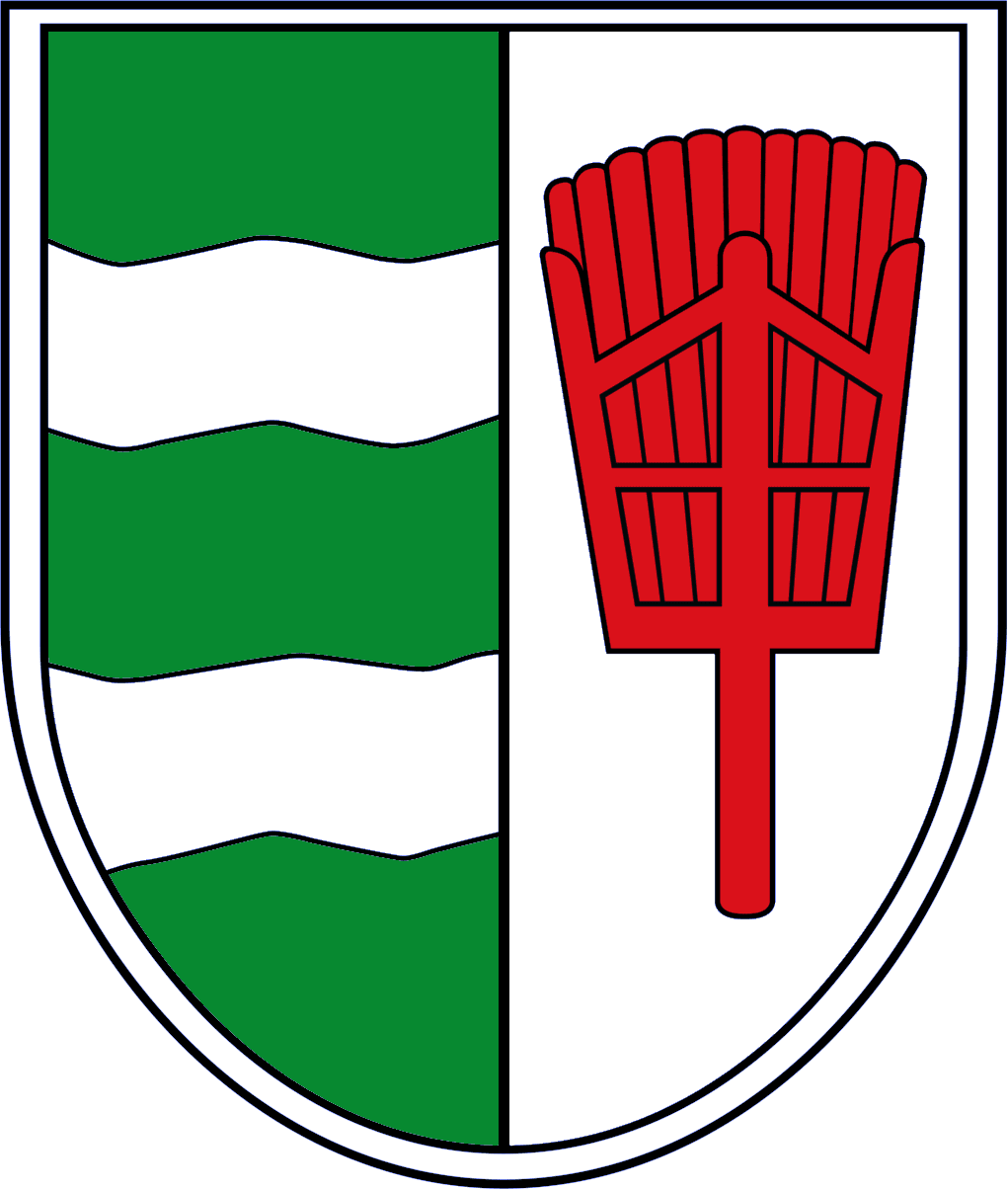
- Coat of arms

- Location of Neuenkirchen within Cuxhaven district
- Interactive map of Neuenkirchen
- Location within Germany Location within Lower Saxony
- Coordinates: 53°46′40″N 08°53′35″E
- Country: Germany
- State: Lower Saxony
- District: Cuxhaven
- Municipal assoc.: Land Hadeln
- Subdivisions: 7 Ortsteile

Government
  - Mayor: Ingo Tietje (SPD)

Area
  - Total: 19.64 km^{2} (7.58 sq mi)
- Elevation: 2 m (6.6 ft)

Population (2025-12-31)
  - Total: 1,290
  - Density: 65.7/km^{2} (170/sq mi)
- Time zone: UTC+01:00 (CET)
  - Summer (DST): UTC+02:00 (CEST)
- Postal codes: 21763
- Dialling codes: 04751, 04755, 04758
- Vehicle registration: CUX

Neuenkirchen (German pronunciation: [ˈnɔʏənˌkɪʁçn̩]; official German disambiguation: Neuenkirchen (Land Hadeln); N. Low Saxon: Neenkarken) is a municipality in the Land Hadeln collective municipality within the district of Cuxhaven, in Lower Saxony, Germany.

== History ==
Neuenkirchen belonged to the Land of Hadeln, first an exclave of the younger Duchy of Saxony and after its de facto dynastic partition in 1296 of the Duchy of Saxe-Lauenburg, established de jure in 1260. In 1728 Emperor Charles VI enfeoffed the George II Augustus and his House of Hanover in personal union with the reverted fief of Saxe-Lauenburg. By a redeployment of Hanoverian territories in 1731 the Hanoverian Duchies of Bremen and Verden were conveyed the administration of the neighboured Land of Hadeln. The Kingdom of Hanover incorporated the Land of Hadeln in a real union and its territory, including Neuenkirchen, became part of the new Stade Region, established in 1823.

== Toponym etymology ==
Neuenkirchen, meaning New Church in German, was named accordingly following the completion of a new Lutheran St. Mary's Church in 1732.

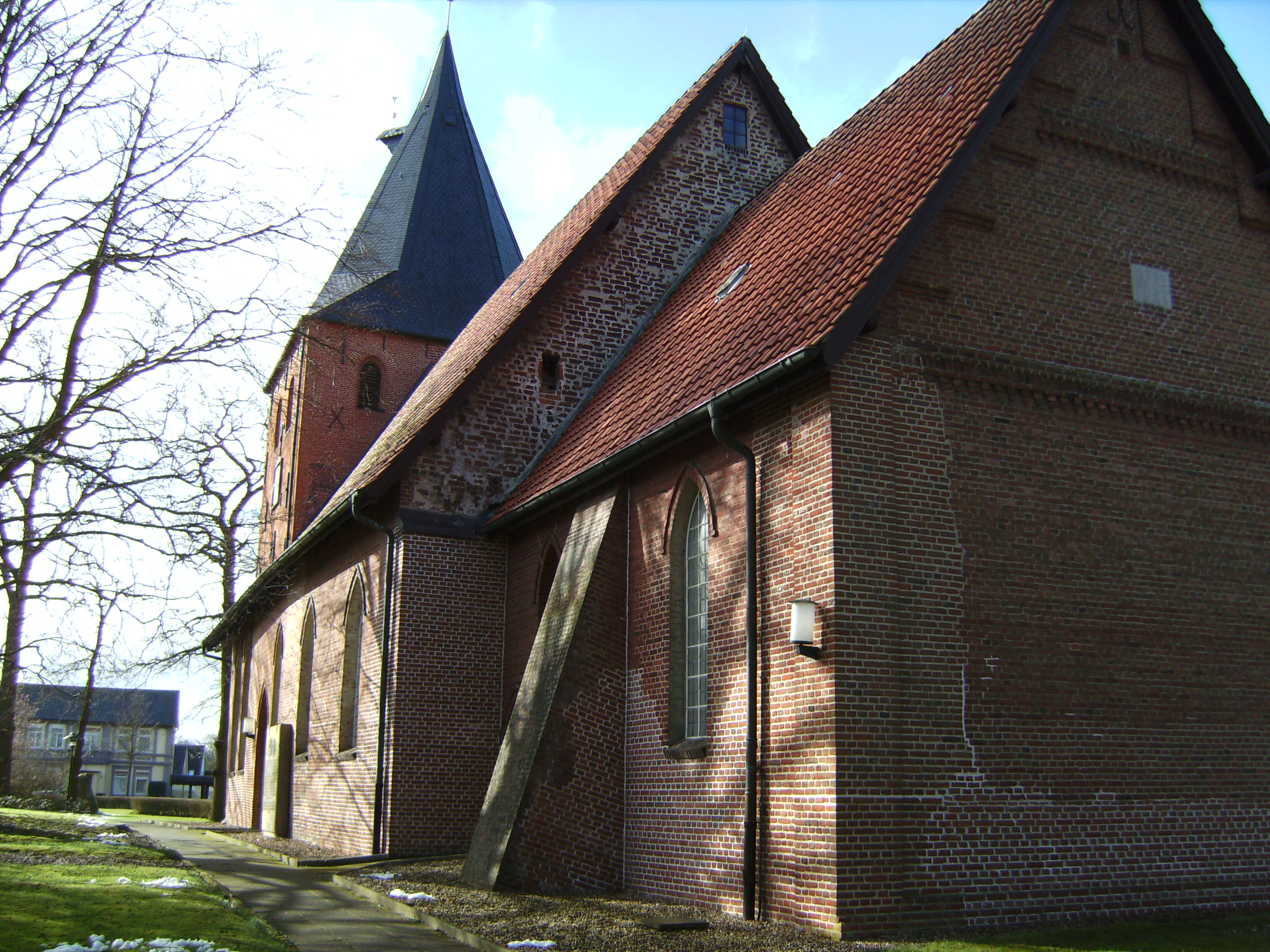
St. Mary's Church in Neuenkirchen.

== Notable people ==
- Hinrich Wilhelm Kopf (1893-1961), German politician
