= Land Hadeln (Samtgemeinde) =

- Samtgemeinde
- Flag Coat of arms

- Location of Land Hadeln within Cuxhaven district
- Interactive map of Land Hadeln
- Location within Germany Location within Lower Saxony
- Coordinates: 53°48′N 8°54′E
- Country: Germany
- State: Lower Saxony
- District: Cuxhaven
- Founded: 2011
- Seat: Otterndorf
- Subdivisions: 14

Government
  - Mayor (2021–26): Frank Thielebeule

Area
  - Total: 77.3 km^{2} (29.8 sq mi)

Population (2025-12-31)
  - Total: 26,655
  - Density: 345/km^{2} (893/sq mi)
- Time zone: UTC+01:00 (CET)
  - Summer (DST): UTC+02:00 (CEST)
- Website: www.samtgemeinde-land-hadeln.de

Land Hadeln is a Samtgemeinde ("collective municipality") in the district of Cuxhaven, in Lower Saxony, Germany. Its seat is in the town Otterndorf. It was formed on 1 January 2011 by the merger of the former Samtgemeinden Hadeln and Sietland. On 1 November 2016 the Samtgemeinde Am Dobrock was merged into Land Hadeln.

The Samtgemeinde Land Hadeln consists of the following municipalities:

1. Belum
2. Bülkau
3. Cadenberge
4. Ihlienworth
5. Neuenkirchen
6. Neuhaus (Oste)
7. Nordleda
8. Oberndorf
9. Odisheim
10. Osterbruch
11. Otterndorf
12. Steinau
13. Wanna
14. Wingst
