= Stinstedt =

- Municipality
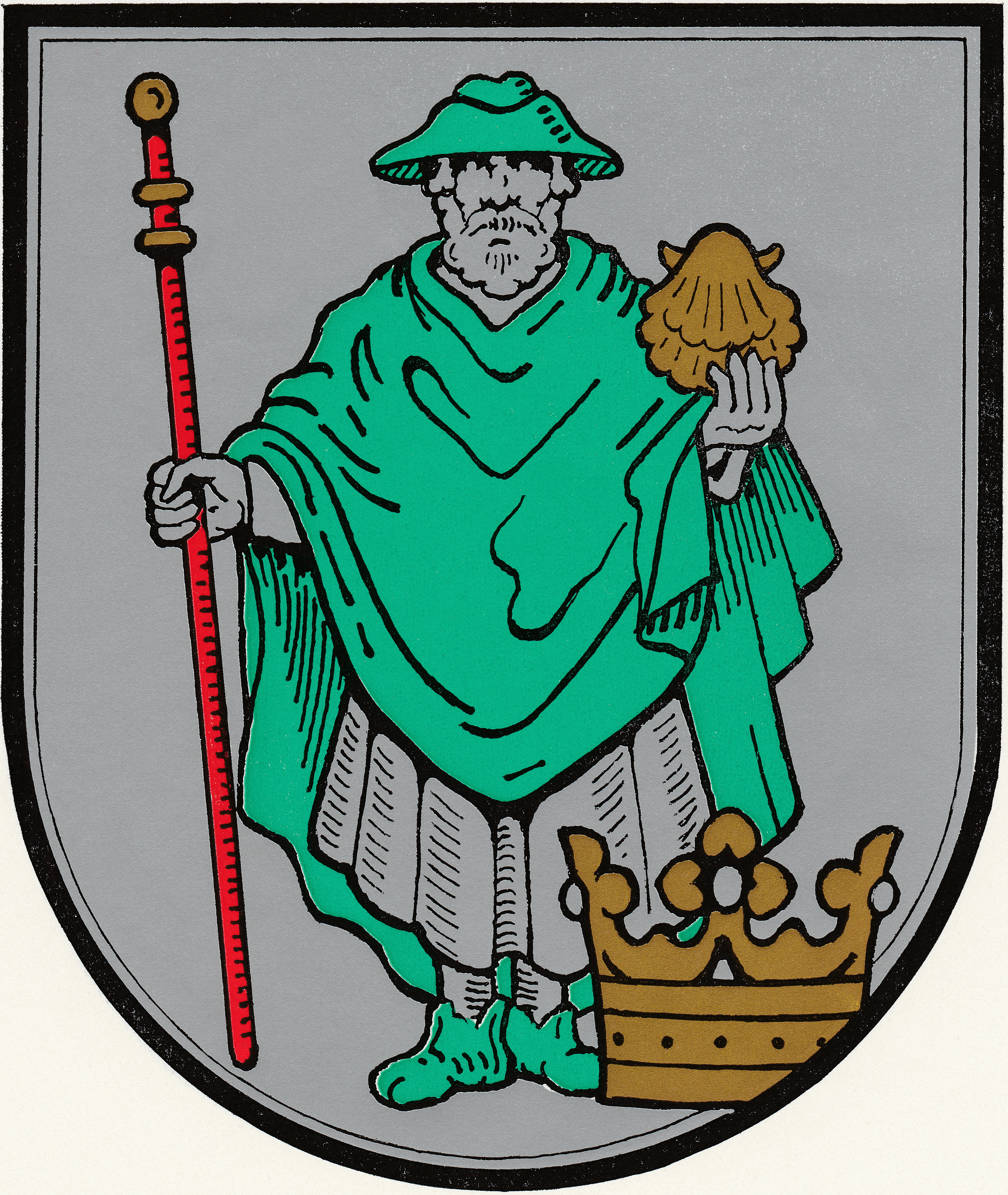
- Coat of arms

- Location of Stinstedt within Cuxhaven district
- Interactive map of Stinstedt
- Location within Germany Location within Lower Saxony
- Coordinates: 53°39′41″N 08°58′16″E
- Country: Germany
- State: Lower Saxony
- District: Cuxhaven
- Municipal assoc.: Börde Lamstedt
- Subdivisions: 4 Ortsteile

Government
  - Mayor: Herbert Pape

Area
  - Total: 30.1 km^{2} (11.6 sq mi)
- Elevation: 7 m (23 ft)

Population (2025-12-31)
  - Total: 515
  - Density: 17.1/km^{2} (44.3/sq mi)
- Time zone: UTC+01:00 (CET)
  - Summer (DST): UTC+02:00 (CEST)
- Postal codes: 21772
- Dialling codes: 04756
- Vehicle registration: CUX
- Website: www.stinstedt.de

Stinstedt is a municipality in the district of Cuxhaven, in Lower Saxony, Germany.

== History ==
Stinstedt belonged to the Prince-Archbishopric of Bremen, established in 1180. The farmers were subject with their small tithe to the Himmelpforten Convent, secularised in 1647. In 1648 the Prince-Archbishopric was transformed into the Duchy of Bremen, which was first ruled in personal union by the Swedish Crown - interrupted by a Danish occupation (1712-1715) - and from 1715 on by the Hanoverian Crown.

After a Prussian and then French occupation from 1806 to 1810, the ephemeric Kingdom of Westphalia annexed the Duchy, before France annexed it with effect of 1 January 1811. In 1813 the Duchy was restored to the Electorate of Hanover, which - after its upgrade to the Kingdom of Hanover in 1814 - incorporated the Duchy in a real union and the Ducal territory, including Stinstedt, became part of the new Stade Region, established in 1823.
