= Alte Liebe (Cuxhaven) =

The Alte Liebe (German for 'Old Love') is a former pier in the port of Cuxhaven, which today serves as a viewing platform. It is located at the river-side boundary of Cuxhaven harbor, towards the shipping channel of the Lower Elbe. Ships bound for Neuwerk and Heligoland, as well as those heading to the sandbanks, depart inward in the direction of the harbor near the platform.

== Description ==
The structure was built in 1733 by sinking three decommissioned ships. The ships were surrounded by piles, and the gaps between them were filled with stones and wood. The goal was to fortify the harbor, which had been damaged by storm surges, and to secure the Große Bake, which at the time marked the harbor entrance.

The Alte Liebe later served as a ship's landing stage and was regularly renovated. In 1982, the structure was converted into a pure observation platform. At the time, the substructure's decaying wooden piles were replaced with a reinforced concrete construction. Above this, a two-story wooden pile building allows gallery visitors to observe shipping traffic on the Lower Elbe.

== Name ==
The name "Alte Liebe" is said to be derived from the foremost of the three sunken ships, which was named Die Liebe (The Love). According to another tradition, the name of the ship was Olivia. However, the local population only referred to it as Oliv, which phonetically resembled the Low German term for "Alte Liebe" (= Ol' Leev), meaning "Old Love."

== Popular culture ==
Bei der Alten Liebe is a short street that leads from Cassen-Eils-Straße and Am Alten Hafen to the properties, including those of the Helgoland sea bath service. Along the street are the listed buildings: the radar tower from 1960, the semaphore from 1884, the Hamburg lighthouse from 1804, the weather station from the 1920s, as well as the fire ship Elbe 1 from 1948 and the minesweeper memorial from 1935.

The German poet Heinrich Heine stayed several times in Cuxhaven. The first time was in September 1823 for a spa visit, followed by a second visit in 1826 and a final one in 1830. Cuxhaven, Ritzebüttel, and the Alte Liebe served as inspiration for some of his works. In a partially preserved poem, which likely dates to 1823, the Alte Liebe is mentioned. These first lines can be found today on a plaque in the harbor:

German

Am Werfte zu Kuxhaven
Da ist ein schöner Ort,
Der heißt "Die Alte Liebe".
Die meinige ließ ich dort...

English

At the port in Kuxhaven
There's a lovely place,
It's called "Die Alte Liebe".
Where I left my embrace...

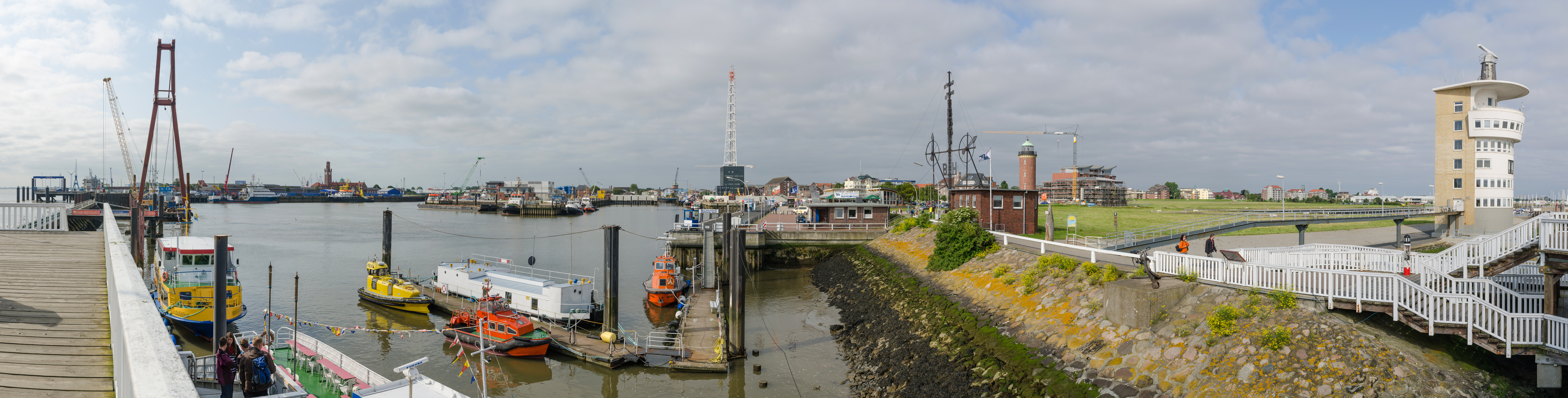
Panoramic view over the port of Cuxhaven photographed from the Alte Liebe

Alte Liebe is the name of the daughter boat of the rescue cruiser Arwed Emminghaus, which was stationed in Cuxhaven from 1965 to 1985, and of the wedding room in the Cuxhaven town hall.

A brandy blend distributed by Berentzen is called Schröders Alte Liebe.
