= Bützfleth =

Coordinates: 53°40′N 9°29′E

Bützfleth is a village with 5000 inhabitants in the north of the city Stade in Lower Saxony. It borders in the south to Götzdorf, in the northwest to Bützflethermoor and Depenbeck, in the north to Abbenfleth and in the east to the river Elbe.

== History ==
Bützfleth belonged to the Prince-Archbishopric of Bremen, established in 1180. In 1648 the Prince-Archbishopric was transformed into the Duchy of Bremen, which was first ruled in personal union by the Swedish Crown - interrupted by a Danish occupation (1712-1715) - and from 1715 on by the Hanoverian Crown. In 1807, the ephemeric Kingdom of Westphalia annexed the Duchy, before France annexed it in 1810. In 1813 the Duchy was restored to the Electorate of Hanover, which - after its upgrade to the Kingdom of Hanover in 1814 - incorporated the Duchy in a real union and the Ducal territory, including Bützfleth, became part of the new Stade Region, established in 1823.

In 1972 Bützfleth was incorporated into the city of Stade, forming one its localities since.

== Politics ==
In the 2021 local elections, the Bützfleth council was won by CDU with 43,86%.
