= Kehdingen =

Kehdingen is the name of a landscape in the north German district of Stade on the Lower Elbe, the lower reaches of the River Elbe. It extends roughly from the mouth of the Oste in the north to the town of Stade in the south. Kehdingen is one of the Elbe Marshes. Until 1932 there was a Prussian district known as Land Kehdingen, and until 1975 there was an Evangelical-Lutheran deanery of Kehdingen with its base in Drochtersen, which was absorbed on 1 January 1976 into the deanery of Stade.

== Important villages ==
- Bützfleth
- Drochtersen
- Freiburg/Elbe
- Wischhafen

== Islands ==
- Krautsand
- Gauensieker Sand
- Asseler Sand
