= Belum =

- Municipality
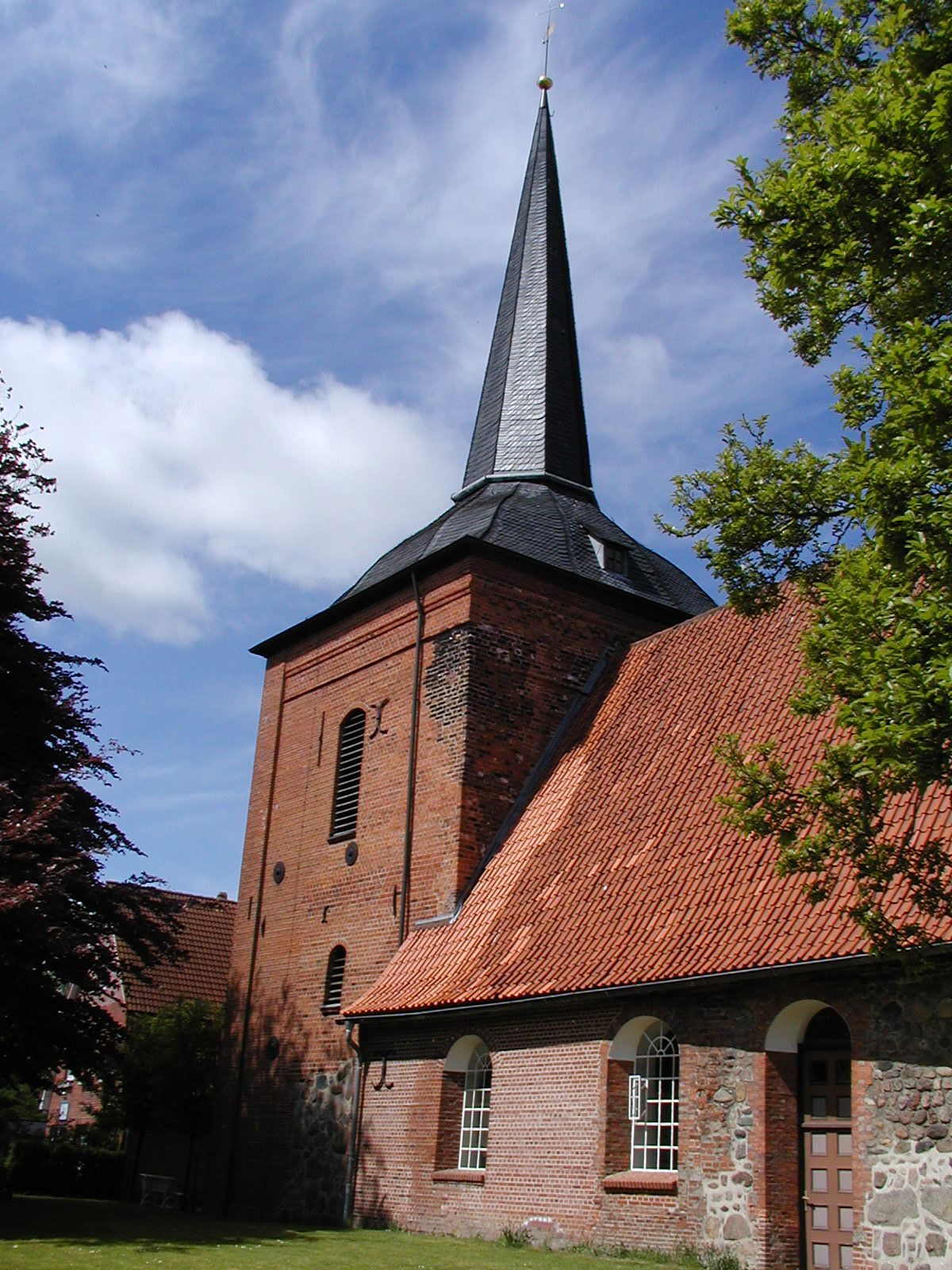
- Evangelical Lutheran St. Vitus Church

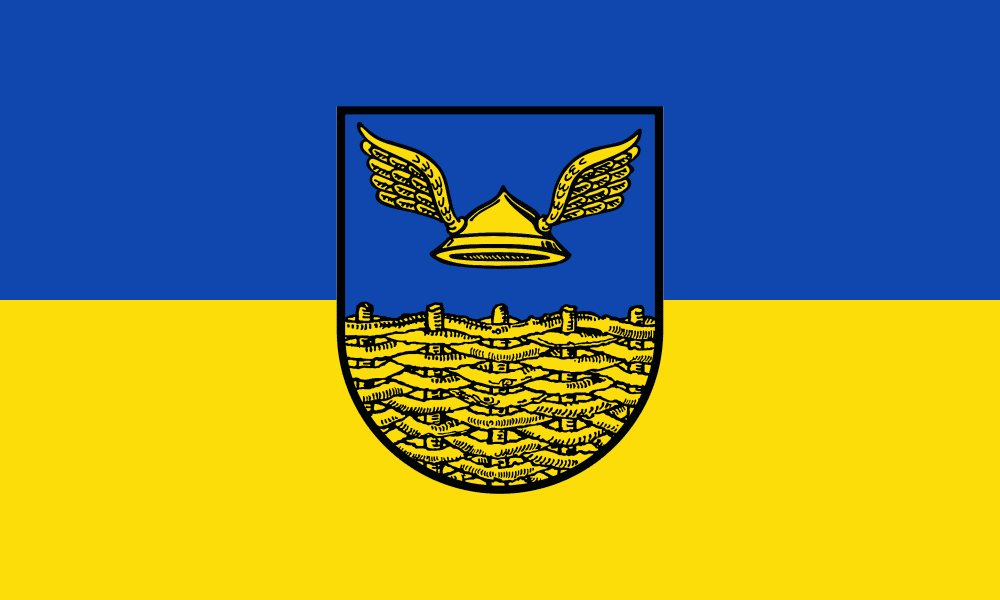
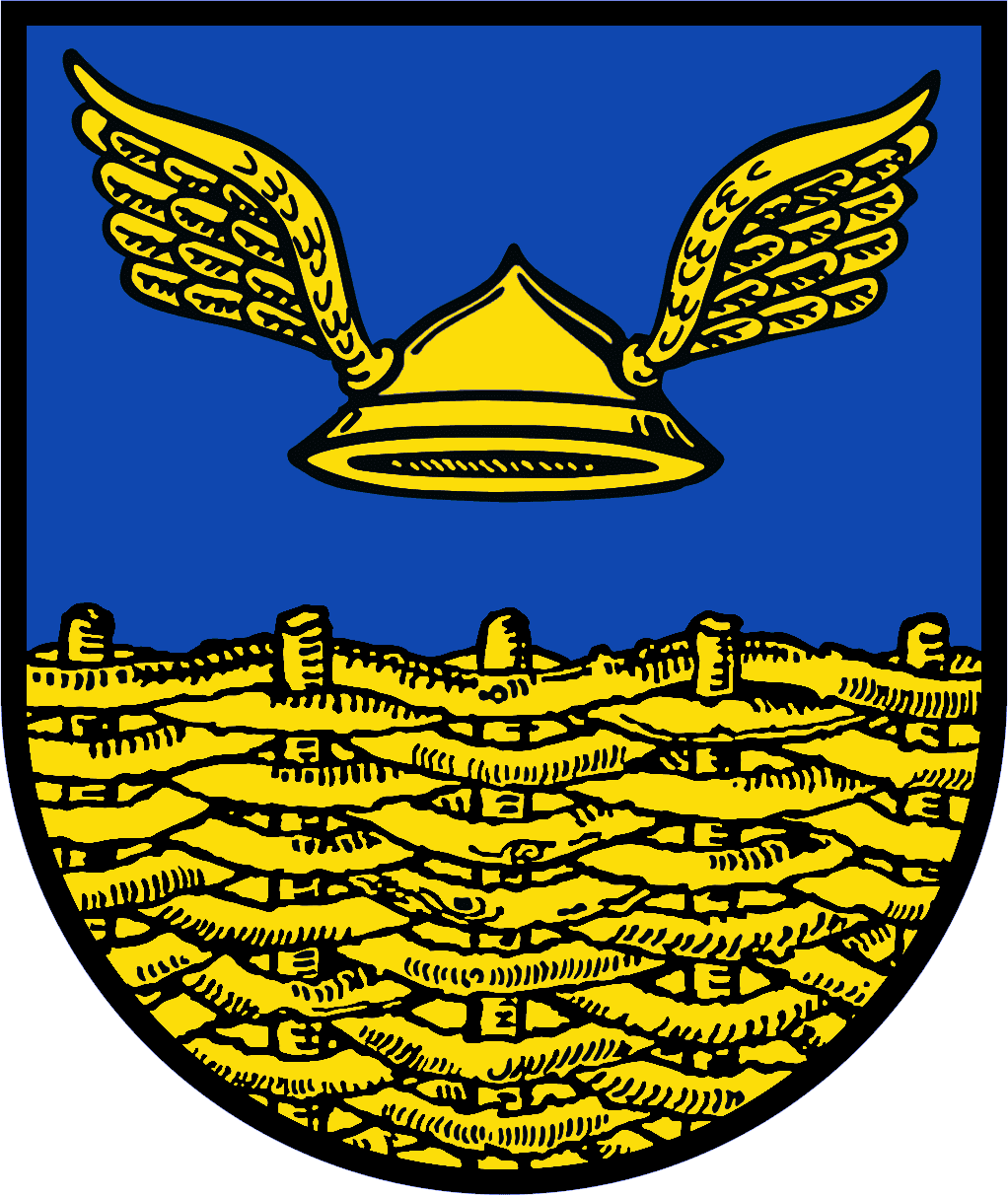
- Flag Coat of arms

- Location of Belum within Cuxhaven district
- Interactive map of Belum
- Location within Germany Location within Lower Saxony
- Coordinates: 53°49′05″N 08°59′44″E
- Country: Germany
- State: Lower Saxony
- District: Cuxhaven
- Municipal assoc.: Land Hadeln
- Subdivisions: 4 Ortsteile

Government
  - Mayor: Karl-Heinz Linck

Area
  - Total: 25.72 km^{2} (9.93 sq mi)
- Elevation: 2 m (6.6 ft)

Population (2025-12-31)
  - Total: 791
  - Density: 30.8/km^{2} (79.7/sq mi)
- Time zone: UTC+01:00 (CET)
  - Summer (DST): UTC+02:00 (CEST)
- Postal codes: 21785
- Dialling codes: 04752
- Vehicle registration: CUX
- Website: www.gemeinde-belum.de

Belum is a municipality in the district of Cuxhaven, in Lower Saxony, Germany.

== History ==
Belum belonged to the Prince-Archbishopric of Bremen. In the mid-16th century the inhabitants adopted Lutheranism. During the Leaguist occupation under Tilly (1628–1630), they suffered from attempts of re-Catholicisation.

In 1648 the prince-archbishopric was transformed into the Duchy of Bremen, which was first ruled in personal union by the Swedish and from 1715 on by the Hanoverian Crown. In 1807 the ephemeric Kingdom of Westphalia annexed the duchy, before France annexed it in 1810. In 1813 the duchy was restored to the Electorate of Hanover, which – after its upgrade to the Kingdom of Hanover in 1814 – incorporated the duchy in a real union and the ducal territory, including Belum, became part of the Stade Region, established in 1823.
