= Cadenberge =

Cadenberge Cumbarg (Low Saxon)
- Municipality
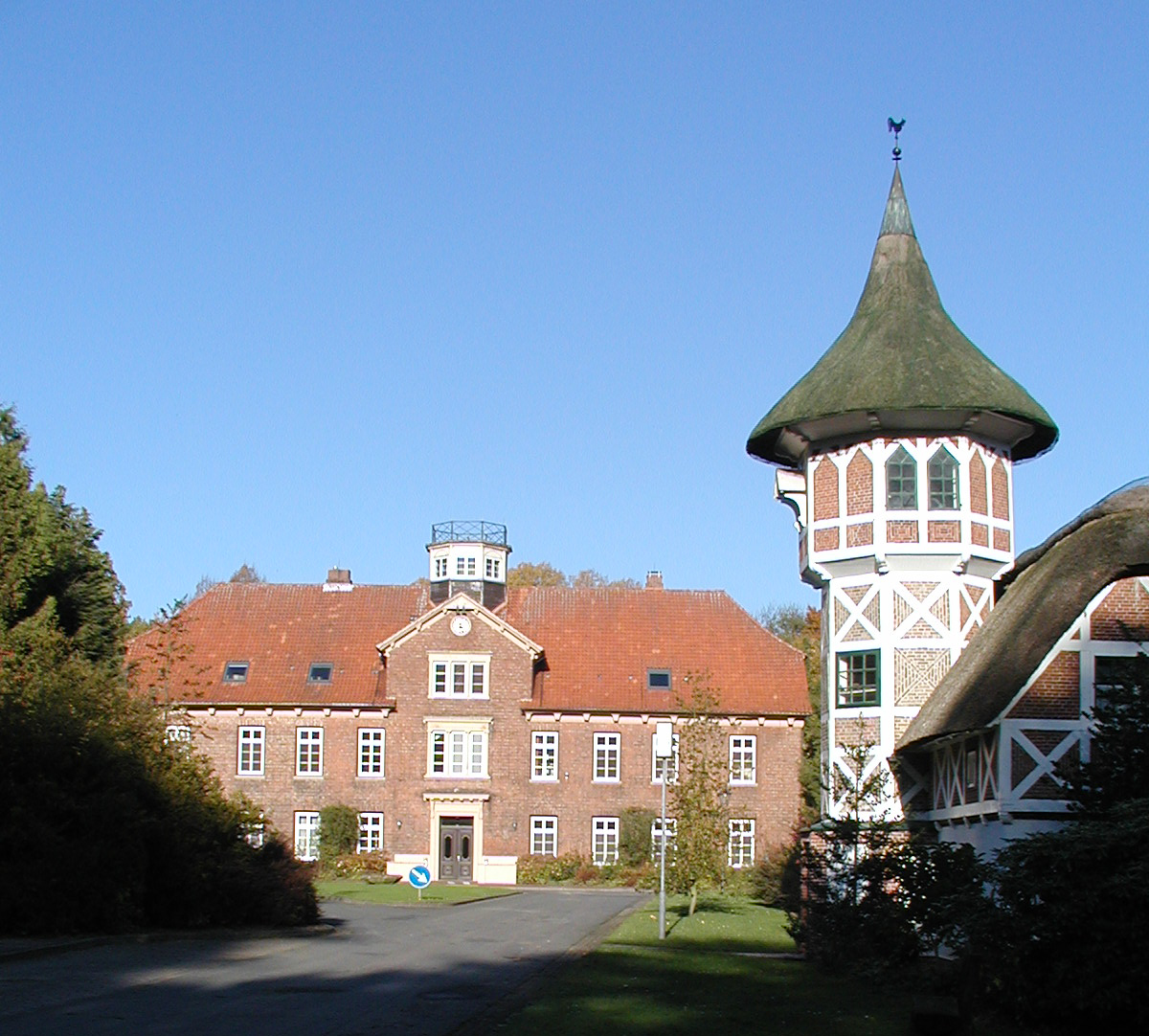
- The boarding school in the castle with the half-timbered dovecot

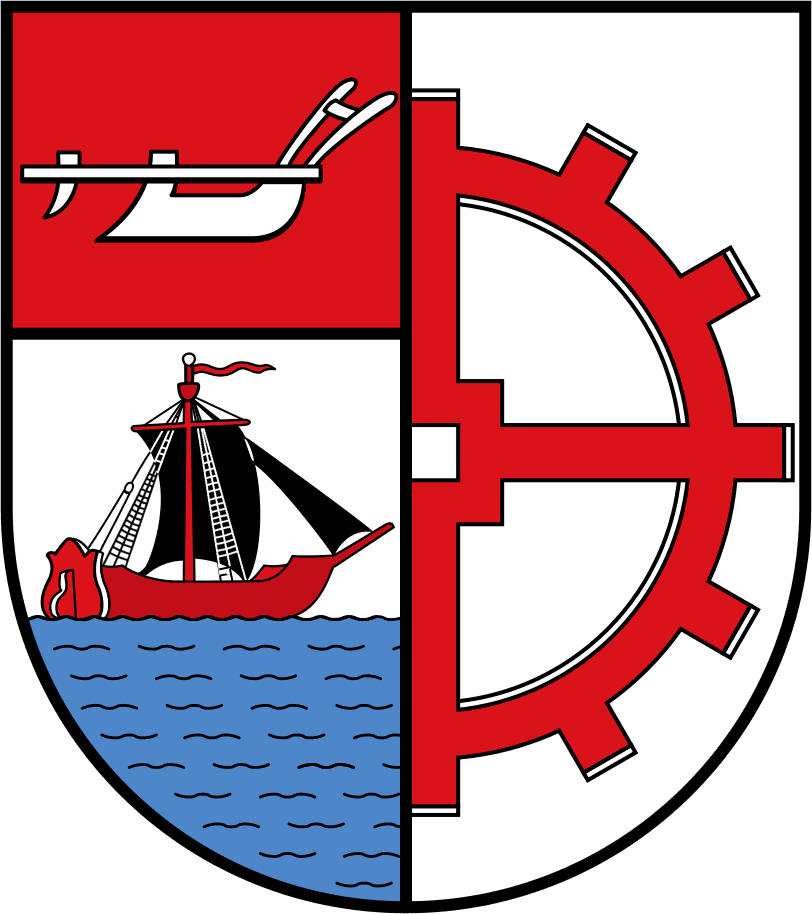
- Coat of arms

- Location of Cadenberge within Cuxhaven district
- Interactive map of Cadenberge
- Location within Germany Location within Lower Saxony
- Coordinates: 53°46′18″N 09°03′28″E
- Country: Germany
- State: Lower Saxony
- District: Cuxhaven
- Municipal assoc.: Land Hadeln

Area
  - Total: 30.98 km^{2} (11.96 sq mi)
- Elevation: 5 m (16 ft)

Population (2025-12-31)
  - Total: 3,878
  - Density: 125.2/km^{2} (324.2/sq mi)
- Time zone: UTC+01:00 (CET)
  - Summer (DST): UTC+02:00 (CEST)
- Postal codes: 21781
- Dialling codes: 04777
- Vehicle registration: CUX
- Website: www.am-dobrock.de

Cadenberge (in High German, in Low Saxon: Cumbarg) is a municipality in the district of Cuxhaven, in Lower Saxony, Germany. Since 1 November 2016, the former municipality Geversdorf is part of the municipality Cadenberge.

Cadenberge belonged to the Prince-Archbishopric of Bremen, established in 1180. In 1648 the Prince-Archbishopric was transformed into the Duchy of Bremen, which was first ruled in personal union by the Swedish Crown - interrupted by a Danish occupation (1712-1715) - and from 1715 on by the Hanoverian Crown. The Kingdom of Hanover incorporated the Duchy in a real union and the Ducal territory became part of the new Stade Region, established in 1823.

== Regular events ==
- Spring Market third weekend in April
- Shooting Cadenberge fourth weekend in June (Saturday)
- Summer (up to 2008 street festival) third Saturday in July
- Shooting Cadenberge-Langenstraße first weekend in September (Sunday)
- Autumn Fair third weekend in October
- Advent Cadenberge meeting of the clubs (up to Christmas 2004) third advent
