= Oberndorf, Lower Saxony =

Oberndorf
- Municipality
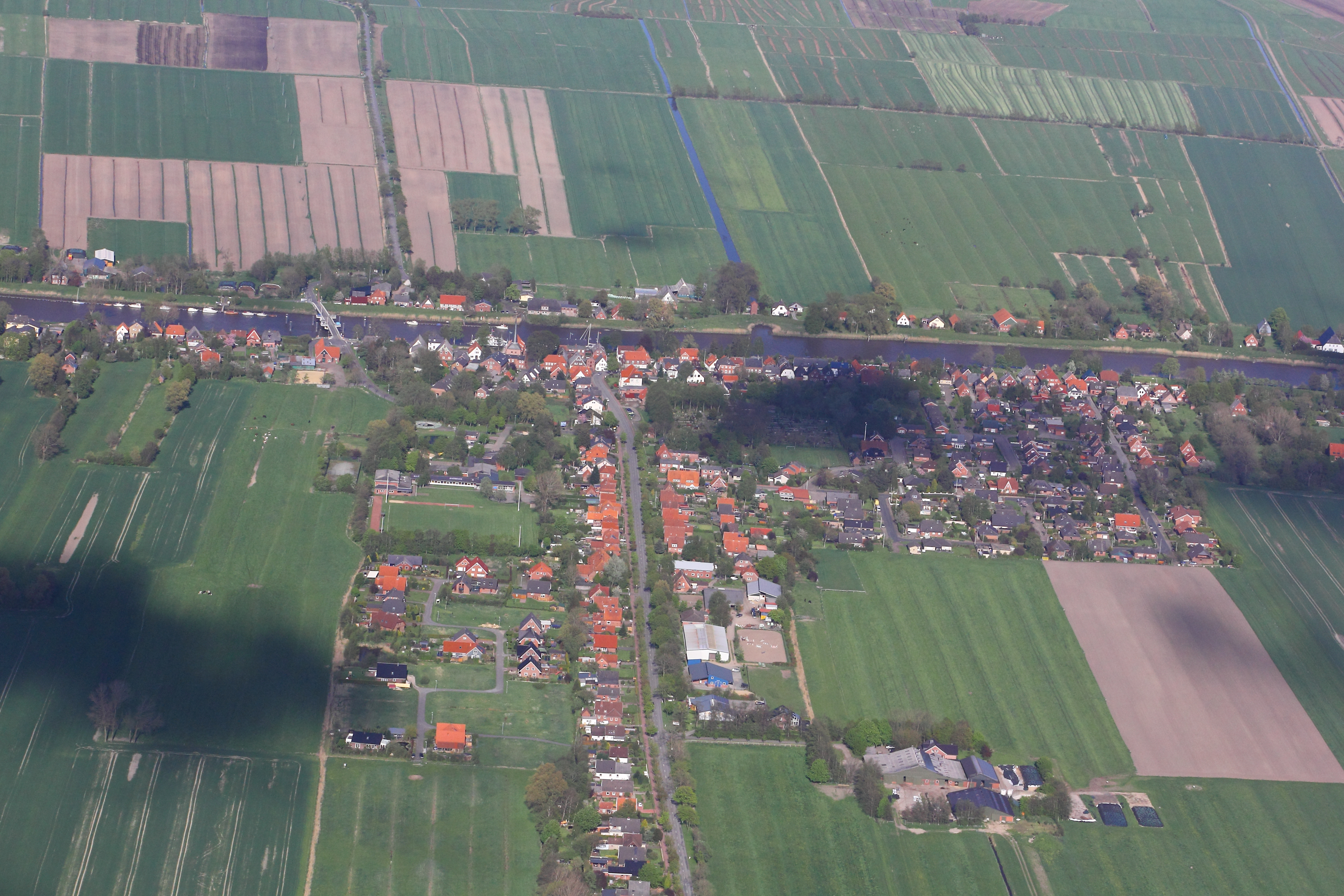
- Aerial view in 2012

- Flag Coat of arms

- Location of Oberndorf within Cuxhaven district
- Interactive map of Oberndorf
- Location within Germany Location within Lower Saxony
- Coordinates: 53°45′00″N 09°09′00″E
- Country: Germany
- State: Lower Saxony
- District: Cuxhaven
- Municipal assoc.: Land Hadeln

Government
  - Mayor: Detlef Horeis (SPD)

Area
  - Total: 32.71 km^{2} (12.63 sq mi)
- Elevation: 1 m (3.3 ft)

Population (2025-12-31)
  - Total: 1,338
  - Density: 40.90/km^{2} (105.9/sq mi)
- Time zone: UTC+01:00 (CET)
  - Summer (DST): UTC+02:00 (CEST)
- Postal codes: 21787
- Dialling codes: 04771, 04772, 04778
- Vehicle registration: CUX
- Website: www.oberndorf-oste.de

Oberndorf (German: [ˈoːbɐndɔʁf]) is a municipality in the district of Cuxhaven, in Lower Saxony, Germany.

== History ==
Oberndorf belonged to the Prince-Archbishopric of Bremen, established in 1180. In 1648 the Prince-Archbishopric was transformed into the Duchy of Bremen, which was first ruled in personal union by the Swedish Crown - interrupted by a Danish occupation (1712–1715) - and from 1715 on by the Hanoverian Crown. The Kingdom of Hanover incorporated the Duchy in a real union and the Ducal territory became part of the new Stade Region, established in 1823.
