= Bülkau =

- Municipality
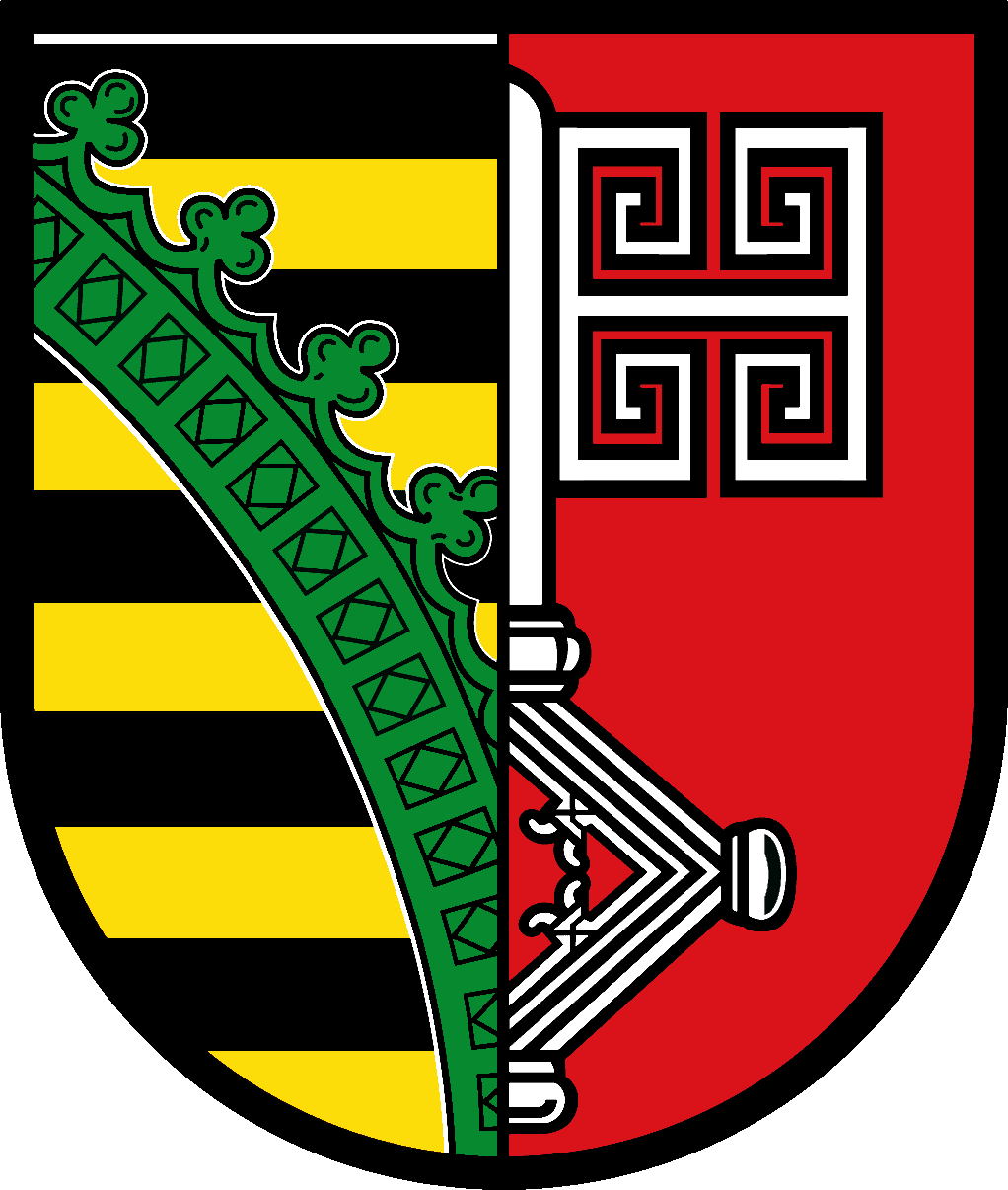
- Coat of arms

- Location of Bülkau within Cuxhaven district
- Interactive map of Bülkau
- Location within Germany Location within Lower Saxony
- Coordinates: 53°45′N 08°52′E
- Country: Germany
- State: Lower Saxony
- District: Cuxhaven
- Municipal assoc.: Land Hadeln

Government
  - Mayor: M. Schmitz (CDU)

Area
  - Total: 23.22 km^{2} (8.97 sq mi)
- Elevation: 1 m (3.3 ft)

Population (2025-12-31)
  - Total: 821
  - Density: 35.4/km^{2} (91.6/sq mi)
- Time zone: UTC+01:00 (CET)
  - Summer (DST): UTC+02:00 (CEST)
- Postal codes: 21782
- Dialling codes: 04754, 04777
- Vehicle registration: CUX

Bülkau is a municipality in the district of Cuxhaven, in Lower Saxony, Germany.

== History ==
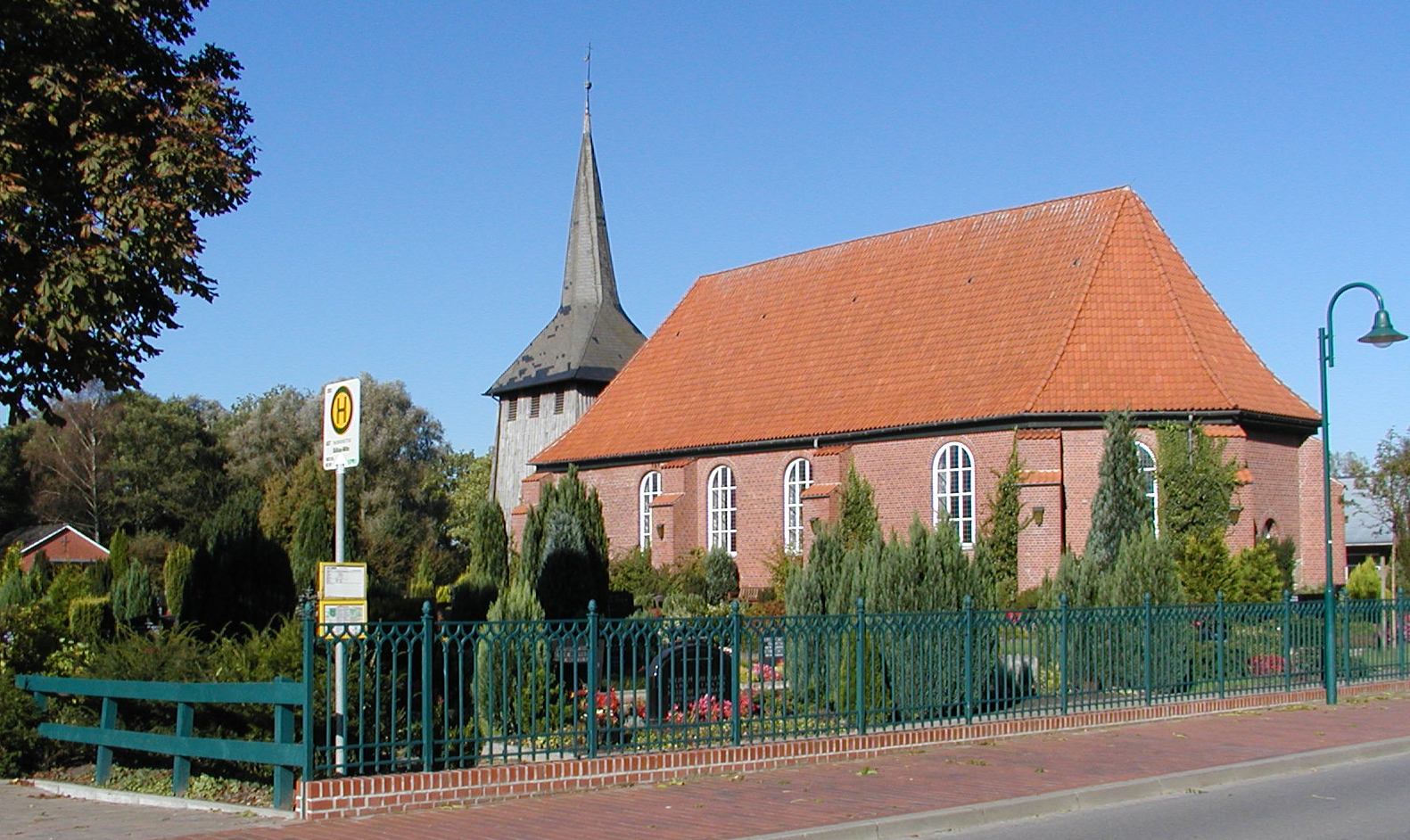
Lutheran St. John the Baptist Church in Bülkau.

Bülkau belonged to the Prince-Archbishopric of Bremen, a territory of imperial immediacy established in 1180. In the mid-16th century Bülkau adopted Lutheranism. During the Catholic Leaguist occupation under Johan 't Serclaes, Count of Tilly (1628–1630), Bülkau suffered from attempts of re-Catholicisation.

In 1648 the prince-archbishopric was transformed into the Duchy of Bremen, which was first ruled in personal union by the Swedish Crown – interrupted by a Danish occupation (1712–1715) – and from 1715 on by the House of Hanover. In 1807 the ephemeric Kingdom of Westphalia annexed the duchy, before France annexed it in 1810. In 1813 the Duchy of Bremen was restored to the Electorate of Hanover, which – after its upgrade to the Kingdom of Hanover in 1814 – incorporated the duchy in a real union and the ducal territory, including Bülkau, became part of the Stade Region, established in 1823.

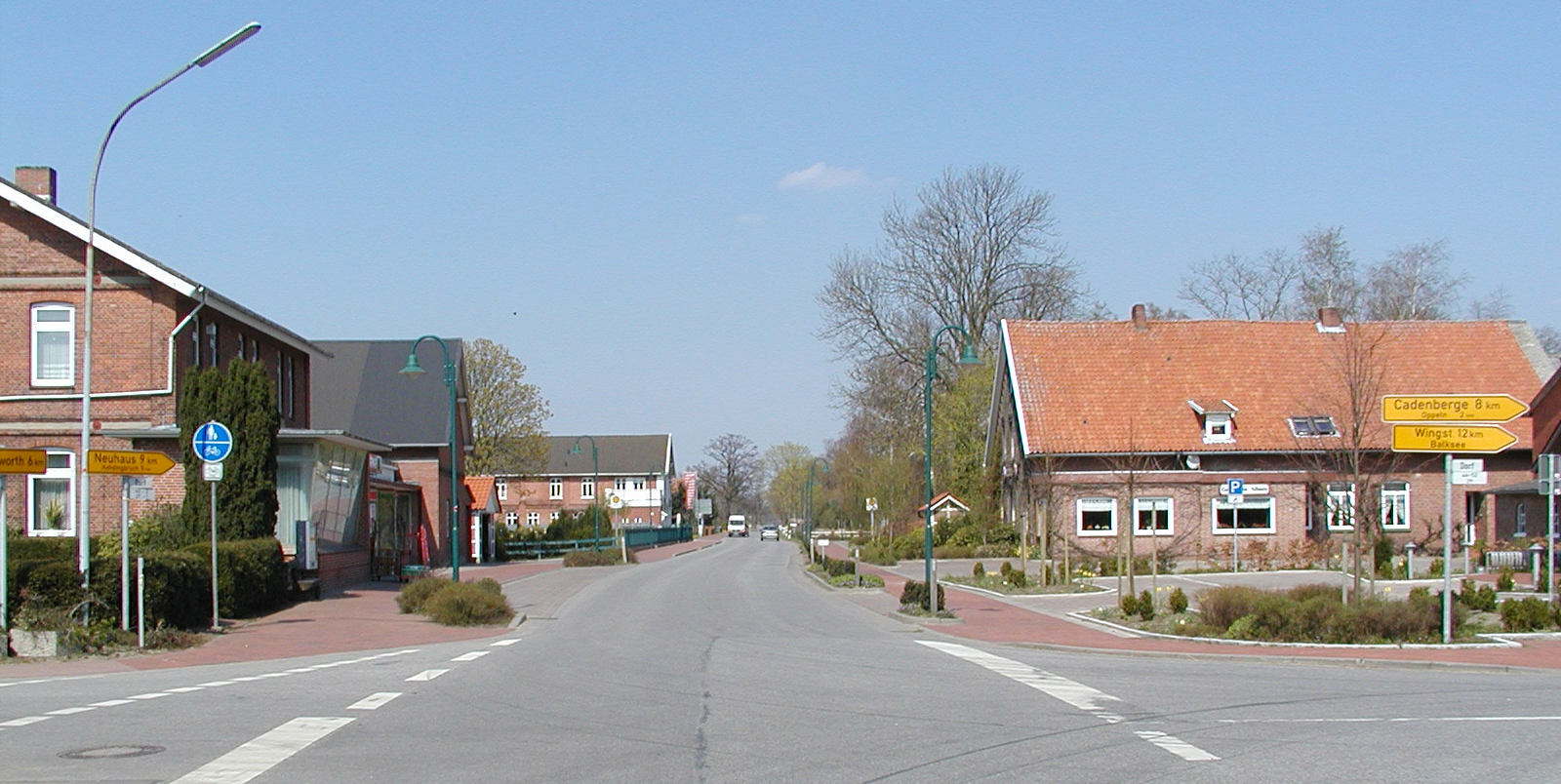
Street in Bülkau.
