= Cuxhaven (district) =

District in Lower Saxony, Germany

Coordinates: 53°40′N 8°50′E

- District
- Flag Coat of arms
- Country: Germany
- State: Lower Saxony
- Capital: Cuxhaven

Government
  - District admin.: Thorsten Krüger (SPD)

Area
  - Total: 2,057.78 km^{2} (794.51 sq mi)

Population (31 December 2022)
  - Total: 201,413
  - Density: 98/km^{2} (250/sq mi)
- Time zone: UTC+01:00 (CET)
  - Summer (DST): UTC+02:00 (CEST)
- Vehicle registration: CUX
- Website: landkreis-cuxhaven.de

Cuxhaven is a district (Landkreis) in Lower Saxony, Germany. It is bounded by (from the east and clockwise) the districts of Stade, Rotenburg, Osterholz and Wesermarsch, the city of Bremerhaven and the North Sea.

== History ==
The district was established in 1977 by merging the former districts of Land Hadeln and Wesermünde. The town of Cuxhaven lost its status as a district-free town and became the capital of the new district.

== Geography ==
The district is often nicknamed Cuxland. It is located on the coast of the North Sea and is enclosed by the river mouths of Elbe and Weser. The coasts are part of the Lower Saxony Wadden Sea National Park.

== Coat of arms ==
The arms display Saint Nicholas, who is the patron saint of fishermen. The coast of the North Sea is symbolised at the bottom of the arms.

== Towns and municipalities ==
Clickable map of municipalities in the district

| Towns | Samtgemeinden |
|---|---|---|
| 1. Cuxhaven; 2. Geestland; Free municipalities: 1. Beverstedt; 2. Hagen im Bremischen; 3. Loxstedt; 4. Schiffdorf; 5. Wurster Nordseeküste | 1. Börde Lamstedt; 1. Armstorf; 2. Hollnseth; 3. Lamstedt^{1}; 4. Mittelstenahe; 5. Stinstedt; 2. Hemmoor; 1. Hechthausen; 2. Hemmoor^{1, 2}; 3. Osten | 3. Land Hadeln; 1. Belum; 2. Bülkau; 3. Cadenberge; 4. Ihlienworth; 5. Neuenkirchen; 6. Neuhaus (Oste); 7. Nordleda; 8. Oberndorf; 9. Odisheim; 10. Osterbruch; 11. Otterndorf^{1, 2}; 12. Steinau; 13. Wanna; 14. Wingst |
| | ^{1}seat of the Samtgemeinde; ^{2}town |
