= Land Hadeln =

Historical region in Northern Germany

Coordinates: 53°45.18′N 8°50.46′E

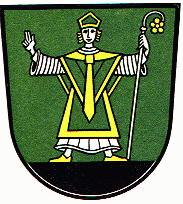
The coat of arms with the patron saint, Saint Nicholas, in bishop's robes

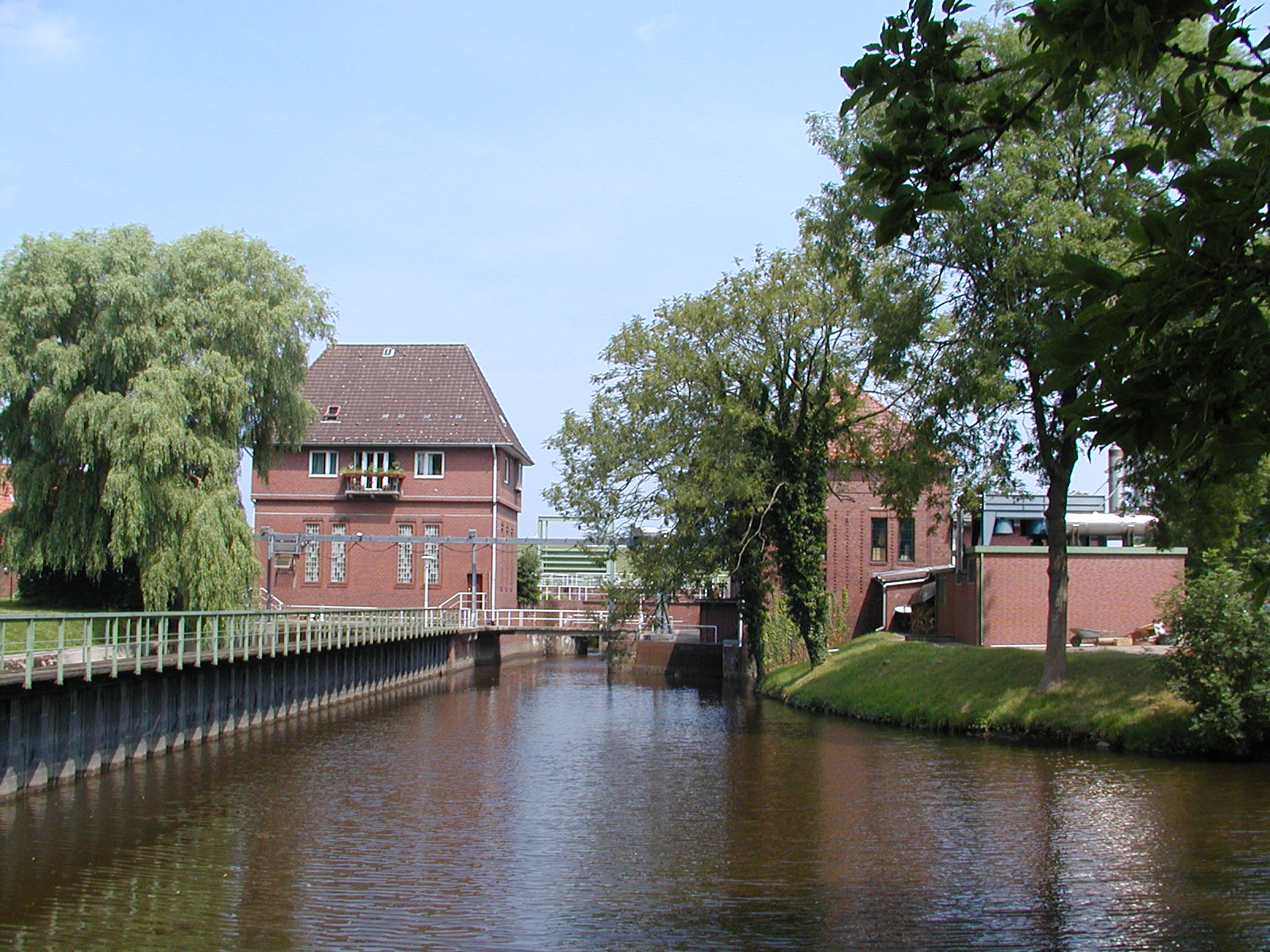
The Otterndorf Sluice and its pumping station. Right: the "diesel" pumphouse (nowadays also driven by an electric engine), left: the electric pumphouse.

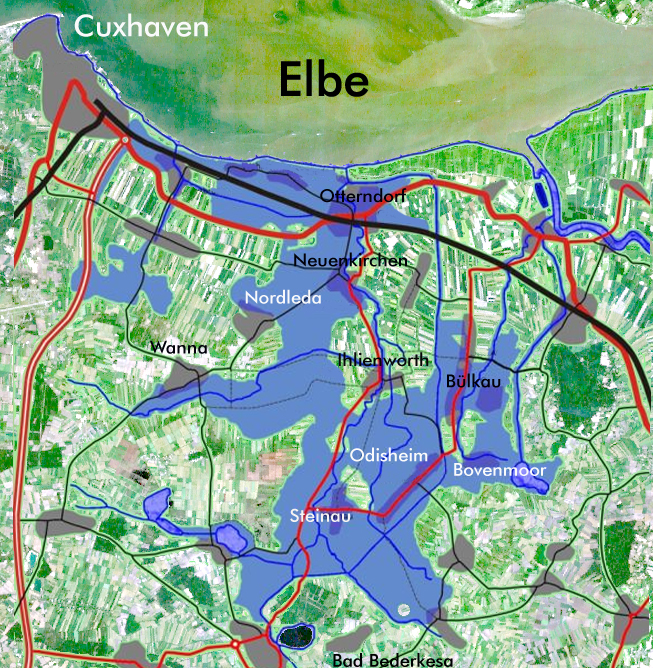
Land flooded by a 'small' storm surge of only 4.50 m when a dyke broke at Glameyer Stack, Otterndorf.

Land Hadeln is a historic landscape and former administrative district in Northern Germany with its seat in Otterndorf on the Lower Elbe, the lower reaches of the River Elbe, in the Elbe-Weser Triangle between the estuaries of the Elbe and Weser.

The name goes back to a place named Haduloha in the Royal Frankish Annals, which must have been in the north of Hohe Lieth moraine range, west of present-day Cuxhaven. Enthusiastic historians of late 19th and early 20th century postulated an Old Saxon Gau (district) of that name, but there is no evidence for this theory.

In the Middle Ages, the Land Hadeln was a fairly, but not perfectly, autonomous rural community, applying Saxon Law. Nominally, it belonged to the Dukes of Saxe-Lauenburg, whom the notables of the country almost had chosen, because they were too weak to rule strictly.

The Land Hadeln has to be consequently distinguished from the Land Wursten west of it that was a perfectly autonomous rural republic, for some centuries. It was the easternmost of the Frisian republics and applied Frisian Law.

== Geography ==
Today the name 'Land Hadeln' is mainly restricted to the dyked marshes in the lowland bay south of the Elbe estuary. It was surrounding by sandy meltwater depositions and moraines of the Saale glaciation (Pleistocene), such as the geest ridges of the Hohe Lieth to the west, the Westerberg (56 m above NN), and the Wingst (74 m above NN) to the east. To the south, between the islands of geest, sprawl extensive areas of fen and raised bog, that have been cultivated however, apart from a small terrain remnant in Ahlenmoor.

The marshland itself, forming part of the Elbe Marshes, is divided in turn into the fertile sea marsh, the so-called Hochland ("highland", ca. 1–2 m above NN; comprising much of today's collective municipality of Hadeln), and the Sietland on the edge of the bogs. Drainage is difficult and is handled mainly by the pumping station (Schöpfwerk Otterndorf) in Otterndorf as well as by the small lock near Altenbruch. At Otterndorf the waters of the Medem and its many tributaries, and the water of the Hadeln Canal, and Elbe-Weser Shipping Channel, is pumped into the Elbe. Hitherto the area, particularly the lower-lying Sietland which lies about 0.8 m below NN, had been chronically endangered by flooding.

The Land Hadeln lies in the Lower Elbe region. Its proximity to the Elbe estuary and the North Sea brings with it the danger that, in the event of a dyke breach during a storm surge the area, which lies just above sea level, will suffer major flooding.

Traditionally the land was used for agriculture, with pastureland and cattle farming on the geest and in the Sietland, and arable and fruit farming in the Hochland.

Following the closure of the cement works in Hemmoor, the relatively small number of industrial workers decreased further. Many workers now commute to the ports of Cuxhaven, Bremerhaven and Stade. The economic importance of tourism, especially in the beach resorts of Otterndorf and the bogside lakes near Bad Bederkesa, is steadily increasing.

== History ==
=== Middle Ages ===
The first written record of Hadeln is found at the end of the 10th century in the Saxon tribal chronicle (Stammessage) by Widukind of Corvey. In other medieval chronicles, the area "where the ocean rinses Saxony" ("wo der Ozean Sachsen bespült") is called Haduloha or Hatheleria. In 797 AD, Charlemagne is supposed to have advanced to Hadeln during a campaign against the Saxons and Frisians.

During the Viking invasions of the 9th to 11th centuries, Hadeln was part of the County of Lesum. In the 10th century, the Udonids established the County of Heilangau, better known under its later name the County of Stade. In 1063, the Udones sold their imperial immediacy to the Archbishopric of Bremen, but remained, as their vassals, still the direct rulers of the county. Around 1100, the development of the marshland in accordance with Holler rights (Hollerrecht) began. With the increase in cultural land and population, Hadeln was separated from the County of Stade as a county in its own right, and became an object of contention, following the death of Count Rudolph II, between Archbishop Hartwig I of Bremen and Henry the Lion, who initially prevailed. After the disagreement of the Welf duke with Frederick Barbarossa and his deposition by the Emperor, the Emperor granted the ducal rights for eastern Saxony to the Ascanians. In Henry's time, the Archbishop of Bremen was allied to Hartwig II. After the death of Henry the Lion's son, Henry V, the County of Stade returned to the Archbishopric. The self-government of Hadeln, under Schultheißen and Schöffen, had become stronger and accepted the Ascanian, Duke Bernard III as ruler in 1210/11.

After that, the state of Hadeln formed a largely independent farmers' republic under the loose overlordship of the dukes of Saxe-Lauenburg. With each change of ruler, the people of Hadeln had their liberties and privileges reaffirmed at the Warningsacker (a legal meeting place) between Otterndorf and Altenbruch. In contrast with the neighbouring state of Wursten, the abbey of Neuenwalde and local aristocratic families were also able to own land within the state, without gaining any major political influence over it.

After Ritzebüttel Castle had changed hands from the Lappe family to Hamburg in 1393, the influence of the Hanseatic city began to take hold with the foundation of the district of Amt Ritzebüttel. (today Cuxhaven) in 1394 in the land of Hadeln. In Otterndorf, which had been granted its town charter in 1400 and where a Latin school was established early on, the citizens of Hamburg helped rebuild the castle, which had previously been destroyed by the Archbishop of Bremen, and from 1407 to 1481 the land was even a fief of Hamburg. However, when the Hamburgers tried to monopolise wheat exports, a rebellion broke out in 1456. After the conflict ended in a stalemate, a lasting compromise was finally reached between the powers of the lordly Amtmann or count in Otterndorf and the otherwise independent authorities of the Hadler estates (Hadler Stände).

== Sources ==
- Eduard Rüther: Hadler Chronik. Quellenbuch zur Geschichte des Landes Hadeln. 1932; reedited Bremerhaven: 1979.
- Norbert Fischer: Im Antlitz der Nordsee – Zur Geschichte der Deiche in Hadeln; Stade 2007: ISBN 978-3-931879-34-1
