= Real union =

Partial unification of two states

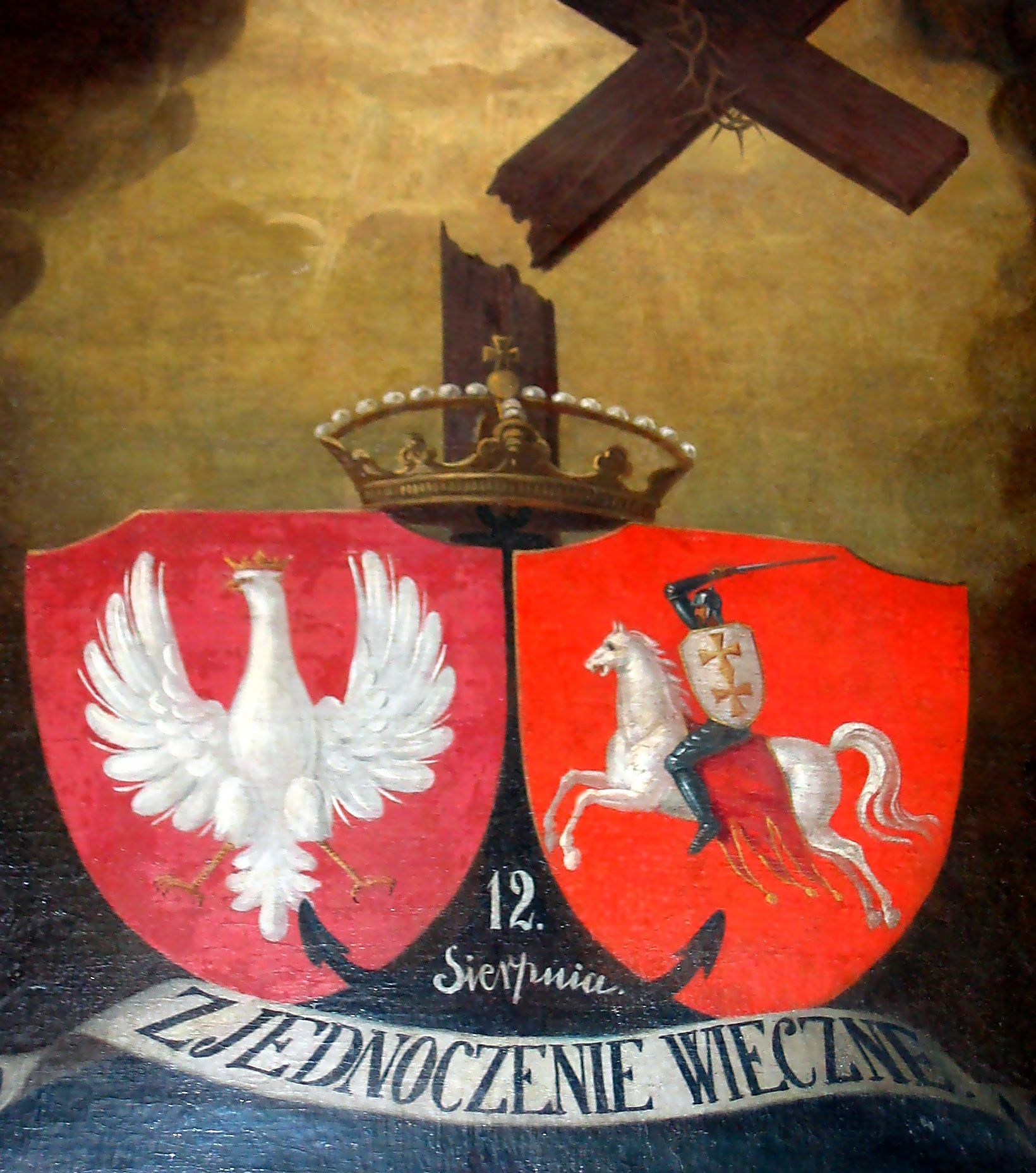
Painting commemorating the real union of the Kingdom of Poland and Grand Duchy of Lithuania as the Polish–Lithuanian Commonwealth in 1569

Real union (real /reɪˈɑːl/, ray-AHL) is a union of two or more states, which share some state institutions in contrast to personal unions; however, they are not as unified as states in a political union. It is a development from personal union and has historically been limited to monarchies.

Unlike personal unions, real unions almost exclusively led to a reduction of sovereignty for the politically weaker constituent. That was the case with Lithuania and Norway, which came under the influence of stronger neighbors, Poland and Denmark respectively, with which each of them had shared a personal union previously.

Sometimes, however, a real union came about after a period of political union. The most notable example of such a move is the Kingdom of Hungary (Lands of the Crown of Saint Stephen), which achieved equal status to Austria (which exercised control over the "Cisleithanian" crown lands) in Austria-Hungary following the Austro-Hungarian Compromise of 1867.

== Historical examples ==
- Spain (1716–1833)
- Denmark–Norway (1537–1814)
- Kingdom of England/Kingdom of Great Britain and Kingdom of Ireland (1542–1800)
- Poland-Lithuania (1569–1791)
- Archduchy of Austria and Kingdom of Bohemia (1620–1918)
- Russian Empire and Grand Duchy of Finland (1809–1917)
- United Kingdom of Portugal, Brazil and the Algarves (1815–1825)
- Russian Empire and Congress Poland (1832–1867):
  The Organic Statute of the Kingdom of Poland replaced the Constitution of 1815 in the aftermath of the failed November Uprising.
- United Principalities of Moldavia and Wallachia (1859–1881)
- Austria-Hungary (1867–1918)
- Hungary-Croatia (1868–1918)
- Netherlands-Indonesia Union (1949–1956)
- Kingdom of the Netherlands and Suriname (1954–1976)

== See also ==
- Composite monarchy
- Dual monarchy
- England and Wales § History of jurisdiction before 1707
