= List of shipwrecks in 1891 =

The following ships were sunk, foundered, grounded, or otherwise lost in the year 1891.

table of contents
1891
Jan	Feb	Mar	Apr
May	Jun	Jul	Aug
Sep	Oct	Nov	Dec

== January ==
=== 2 January ===
List of shipwrecks: 2 January 1891
Ship	State	Description
Thames	United Kingdom	The Penzance steamer was on a voyage to London when she grounded on the Chesil Bank in thick fog.

=== 5 January ===
List of shipwrecks: 5 January 1891
Ship	State	Description
Idris	United Kingdom	The Aberdovey schooner collided with the Ringleader in the ″Gulf stream″ and sank immediately. The crew were saved.

=== 8 January ===
List of shipwrecks: 8 January 1891
Ship	State	Description
Kaffraria	United Kingdom	Part of the wreck of Kaffraria in March 2007 The cargo steamer was wrecked in the River Elbe in Germany.

=== 9 January ===
List of shipwrecks: 9 January 1891
Ship	State	Description
James W. Wherren	United States	The schooner was stranded in a storm at Barrancas Light, Pensacola, Florida.

=== 11 January ===
List of shipwrecks: 11 January 1891
Ship	State	Description
Almsford	United Kingdom	The steamer was hit on the port side by the steamer Ethel (United Kingdom) and foundered stern-first off St Just, Cornwall. The crew were landed at St Ives, Cornwall by the steamer North Devon. One life was lost.
Charles H. Boynton	United States	The schooner was wrecked on Libby Island, near Machias, Maine and became a total loss. The crew made it to shore in her dories.
Ethel	United Kingdom	The steamer hit the Almsford (United Kingdom) on the port side off St Just, and headed to St Ives, Cornwall where she was beached.

=== 16 January ===
List of shipwrecks: 16 January 1891
Ship	State	Description
Bonne Julienne	France	The brigantine foundered eight miles south-west of Mousehole, Cornwall while taking coal from Swansea, Wales to Brest, France. The crew survived and landed at Mousehole.

=== 29 January ===
List of shipwrecks: 29 January 1891
Ship	State	Description
Josephet Marie	France	The brigantine, carrying pitchwood from Hennebont, France to Newport, Wales, collided with the Barry streamer Blairmount (United Kingdom) in fog, off Trevose Head. All on board were landed at Falmouth on the same day.

=== Unknown date ===
List of shipwrecks: Unknown January 1891
Ship	State	Description
Veteran	United States	The schooner left Gloucester, Massachusetts on 7 January for the Georges Bank and vanished. Lost with all 12 hands.

== February ==
=== 3 February ===
List of shipwrecks: 3 February 1891
Ship	State	Description
Senator Morgan	United States	The schooner was wrecked at Cow Bay. Crew made it to shore.

=== 5 February ===
List of shipwrecks: 5 February 1891
Ship	State	Description
Chiswick	United Kingdom	The 1,261-ton steamship ran aground in calm weather on the northeast ledges of the Seven Stones Reef, while bound for St Nazaire, France, with coal from Cardiff, Wales. The captain is supposed to have said "every man for himself" before going down along with ten crew and his ship. Eight survivors were picked up by the Sevenstones Lightship's longboat.

=== 6 February ===
List of shipwrecks: 6 February 1891
Ship	State	Description
Hattie G. McFarland	United States	The bark was stranded on Santa Rosa Island, Florida (30°19′N 87°18′W).

=== 7 February ===
List of shipwrecks: 7 February 1891
Ship	State	Description
Sarah E. Lee	United States	The schooner was wrecked at Lockeport, Nova Scotia in heavy seas, a total loss. Crew was rescued.

=== 18 February ===
List of shipwrecks: 18 February 1891
Ship	State	Description
Bruce	United Kingdom	The sailing ship capsized in New York Harbor. She was salvaged and placed in use as a coal storage hulk.

=== 19 February ===
List of shipwrecks: 19 February 1891
Ship	State	Description
Trignac	France	The steamer sprang a leak, blew up and sank within five minutes, between the Isles of Scilly and the Seven Stones Reef. She was carrying coal from Newport to St Nazaire.

=== 20 February ===
List of shipwrecks: 20 February 1891
Ship	State	Description
Teresa Garnham	Chile	The ship was sailing from Valparaíso to Chiloé when she struck a rock. The crew took to her boats and reached port.

== March ==
=== 1 March ===
List of shipwrecks: 1 March 1891
Ship	State	Description
H.L.C.	France	The brigantine ran aground on the Mixon Shoal, in the Bristol Channel and was wrecked. Her crew survived. She was on a voyage from Port Talbot, Glamorgan, United Kingdom to Pornic, Loire-Inférieure.

=== 9 March ===
List of shipwrecks: 9 March 1891
Ship	State	Description
Agnes & Helen	United Kingdom	Great Blizzard of 1891: The schooner was wrecked in Bream Bay, Maenporth, Cornwall. on voyage from Faversham to Newport with cement.
Alice Crookall	United Kingdom	Great Blizzard of 1891: The schooner was wrecked in Mutton Cove, Godrevy, Cornwall on voyage from Swansea to Jersey. The crew were able to reach the shore.
Dove	United Kingdom	Great Blizzard of 1891: The smack was wrecked in Porthoustock Cove, Cornwall on voyage from Exmouth to Greece with manure.
Dryad	United Kingdom	Great Blizzard of 1891: All 24 crewmen drowned when the barque was wrecked off Start Point, Devon, from Shields, River Tyne for Valparaíso.
Dundela	United Kingdom	Great Blizzard of 1891: The cargo ship was wrecked in a heavy gale on Straythe Rocks, near Portloe, in Veryan Bay, Cornwall, with the loss of one of her crew of 15. She was on a voyage from São Miguel Island, Azores, Portugal to Hull, Yorkshire.
Linesdale	United Kingdom	Great Blizzard of 1891: The schooner was wrecked off Start Point, Devon. Four men drowned.
Lizzie Ellen	United Kingdom	Great Blizzard of 1891: Two of the crew drowned when the schooner was wrecked off Start Point, Devon.
Marana	United Kingdom	Great Blizzard of 1891: The steamer was wrecked on Blackstone Ledge, Start Point, Devon, on a voyage from London to Colombo with railway sleepers. 22 of her crew of 25 were lost.
Martha	United Kingdom	Great Blizzard of 1891: The crew of the Carnarvon schooner were rescued by the Lyonesse as she began to sink. She was taking slate to London.
Mirama	Sweden	Great Blizzard of 1891: The crew took to the boats when the schooner was wrecked off Start Point, Devon; twenty-eight drowned. Four men landed alive but one later died.
Pilot Cutter No.3	United Kingdom	Great Blizzard of 1891: Severely damaged at Plymouth and became a constructive total loss.
Prima Donna	United Kingdom	Great Blizzard of 1891: The Penzance schooner foundered off the Land's End, Cornwall during a blizzard. She was carrying 308 tons of coal and there were five men onboard.

=== 10 March ===
List of shipwrecks: 10 March 1891
Ship	State	Description
Bay of Panama	United Kingdom	Great Blizzard of 1891: The full-rigged ship was driven ashore at Nare Point, The Lizard, Cornwall in a blizzard. She was on a voyage from Calcutta, India to Dundee, Forfarshire. 23 of her crew of 40 were drowned or frozen to death.
Emilie	France	Great Blizzard of 1891: The brig was wrecked off Berry Head, Devon, on voyage from Le Havre for Guadeloupe. All crew were saved by rocket apparatus.
Saint Halvard	United Kingdom	Great Blizzard of 1891: The barquentine was abandoned after wheel carried away and hatches stove in 16 nautical miles (30 km) west of the Scilly Isles, on a voyage from Newport, Wales to Laguna. Her crew were taken off by steamer Hibernia (United Kingdom).

=== 13 March ===
List of shipwrecks: 13 March 1891
Ship	State	Description
USS Galena	United States Navy	While under tow by the tug USS Nina (United States Navy), the decommissioned armed steamer ran aground in fog on Devil's Bridge — a reef off Martha's Vineyard, Massachusetts — without loss of life. She was refloated several days later. Deemed damaged beyond repair, she was sold for salvage on 2 May 1892.
USS Nina	United States Navy	While towing the steamer USS Galena (United States Navy), the 137-foot (42 m) tug ran aground in fog on Devil's Bridge — a reef off Martha's Vineyard, Massachusetts — without loss of life. She was refloated several days later, repaired, and returned to service.
Roxburgh Castle	United Kingdom	The 1,222-ton cargo steamer was on a voyage from Newport, Wales, to Piraeus, Greece, with a cargo of coal when she collided with the sailing ship British Peer (United Kingdom) 120 nautical miles (220 km; 140 mi) southwest of the Isles of Scilly during the Great Blizzard of 1891. Roxburgh Castle sank, losing 22 of her 24 crew members.

=== 15 March ===
List of shipwrecks: 15 March 1891
Ship	State	Description
USS Triana	United States Navy	The 137-foot (42 m), 450-ton tug was wrecked off the coast of Massachusetts on a sandbar off the east end of Cuttyhunk Island because of a navigational error by her crew. She sank in up to 20 feet (6.1 m) of water just west of Canapitsit Channel at 41°25′15″N 070°55′02″W.

=== 17 March ===
List of shipwrecks: 17 March 1891
Ship	State	Description
Utopia	United Kingdom	Utopia The passenger ship collided with the battleship HMS Anson (Royal Navy) in the Bay of Gibraltar and sank with the loss of 552 of the 880 people aboard.

=== 20 March ===
List of shipwrecks: 20 March 1891
Ship	State	Description
Sovereign	Norway	The full-rigged ship was destroyed by fire while loading coal.

=== Unknown date ===
List of shipwrecks: Unknown March 1891
Ship	State	Description
Dictator	Norway	The barque, carrying a cargo of timber to Hartlepool went ashore at Norfolk, Virginia. Seven of the crew were saved by the rocket line, while six crew, the captain's wife and child drowned.
Empress	United Kingdom	The smack sank off the Irish coast and the crew were landed at Liverpool on the 6 March.

== April ==
=== 2 April ===
List of shipwrecks: 2 April 1891
Ship	State	Description
Amicus	United Kingdom	The barque was stranded on Flug Island Shoals hear the West Pass to Apalachicola Bay. Florida.

=== 6 April ===
List of shipwrecks: 6 April 1891
Ship	State	Description
Premier	United States	Carrying 18 fishermen, seven crewmen, and a cargo of 350 tons of cannery supplies, the 307.69-gross register ton, 141.7-foot (43.2 m), three-masted schooner was wrecked during a snowstorm in Ramsey Bay (55°10′N 160°00′W) in the District of Alaska on the south coast of the Alaska Peninsula. All on board survived. Premier was salvaged, repaired, and returned to service.

=== 15 April ===
List of shipwrecks: 15 April 1891
Ship	State	Description
Dashing Wave	United States	During a voyage in the District of Alaska from Sand Point to a destination identified as "Isatok" with a crew of eight and a cargo of 120 tons of general merchandise on board, the 141.46-ton 106-foot (32.3 m) schooner was wrecked without loss of life during a gale and heavy snowstorm in a location identified as "Coal Bay." This location often is equated with Coal Harbor (55.3369°N 160.6042°W) on Unga Island in the Shumagin Islands, but it might instead be Coal Bay (55°22′N 161°22′W) on the south coast of the Alaska Peninsula. The wreck may also have occurred in Zachary Bay (55.3455°N 160.6316°W) – often called "Coal Bay" at the time – on the coast of Unga Island, and some early reports place it somewhere in the Bering Sea, while an 1892 report places it on Hair Seal Cape – now known as Seal Cape (55.9950°N 158.4328°W) – on the south coast of the Alaska Peninsula.

=== 19 April ===
List of shipwrecks: 19 April 1891
Ship	State	Description
Lydia Skolfield	United States	Carrying a cargo of cottonseed oil, the square-rigged ship was wrecked in fog without loss of life at Newport, Rhode Island, off Bateman's Beach, just east of Butter Ball Rock. Her wreck sank in up to 30 feet (9.1 m) of water at 41°27′31″N 071°21′41″W.

=== 23 April ===
List of shipwrecks: 23 April 1891
Ship	State	Description
Blanco Encalada	Chilean Navy	1891 Chilean Civil War: The Almirante Cochrane-class central battery ship was sunk by a torpedo gunboat in the port of Caldera, Chile.

=== 28 April ===
List of shipwrecks: 29 May 1891
Ship	State	Description
SS Lawrence	New Zealand	The 399grt collier damaged her propeller on the Mōkihinui River bar and broke her back on the beach.

== May ==
=== 2 May ===
List of shipwrecks: 2 May 1891
Ship	State	Description
Sadie F. Caller	United States	During a voyage from San Francisco, California, to Chignik Bay, District of Alaska, carrying 158 cannery workers as passengers, a 450-ton salmon-canning outfit as cargo, and a crew of 10, the 413.81-gross register ton, 393.25-foot (119.86 m) schooner was wrecked on a sand bar whose position had shifted without the knowledge of the crew, altering the navigable channel, at the entrance to Chignik Bay Harbor (56°18′N 158°24′W) on the Gulf of Alaska coast of the Alaska Peninsula near Chignik. The steamer Polar Bear (United States) towed her to shore two hours later, and she was beached and declared a total loss. By 1913, her wreck reportedly had sunk in 60 feet (18.3 m) of water.

=== 3 May ===
List of shipwrecks: 3 May 1891
Ship	State	Description
Clan Lamont	United Kingdom	The ship ran aground and sank off Vindiloas Point, Batticaloa, Sri Lanka.

=== 11 May ===
List of shipwrecks: 11 May 1891
Ship	State	Description
Tancarville	Flag unknown	While in dry dock at Newport, Wales, the petroleum-laden steamer exploded when boiler-makers were working on an empty tank. Five men killed, one boy missing and considerable damage was done to the neighbouring buildings.

=== 15 May ===
List of shipwrecks: 15 May 1891
Ship	State	Description
Thekla	Sweden	The barque ran ashore at Prawle Point, Devon and was abandoned following the failed attempt by two tugs to refloat her. The cargo of timber was removed.

=== 17 May ===
List of shipwrecks: 17 May 1891
Ship	State	Description
Martaban	United Kingdom	The barque ran aground and was wrecked off the coast of Cuba. She was on a voyage from the Salt River, Jamaica to Glasgow, Renfrewshire.

=== 21 May ===
List of shipwrecks: 21 May 1891
Ship	State	Description
Thomas Hume	United States	The lumber schooner sank in Lake Michigan in a squall. Lost with all 6 hands.

=== Unknown date ===
List of shipwrecks: Unknown May 1891
Ship	State	Description
Helga	United Kingdom	The barque was wrecked off Newfoundland; there was one survivor.

== June ==
=== 4 June ===
List of shipwrecks: 4 June 1891
Ship	State	Description
Fayette Brown	United States	The schooner was rammed and sunk by Northern Queen (flag unknown) in Pelee Passage in Lake Erie in 60 feet (18 m) of water. One crewman of Fayette Brown jumped aboard Northern Queen and the rest were rescued from her rigging by Robert Mills (flag unknown). The wreck was removed in 1893.

=== 16 June ===
List of shipwrecks: 16 June 1891
Ship	State	Description
David F. Low	United States	The schooner was wrecked at Port au Port, Newfoundland in heavy seas. Crew was rescued.

== July ==
=== 11 July ===
List of shipwrecks: 11 July 1891
Ship	State	Description
Eilen	United Kingdom	The barque left Newcastle, Australia with a cargo of coal for Nouméa, New Caledonia. The vessel sprang a leak during a storm, the crew abandoned ship after three days of working the pumps and the vessel floundered shortly after. Only one crew member survived and landed at Seal Rocks, New South Wales.

=== 18 July ===
List of shipwrecks: 18 July 1891
Ship	State	Description
Princesse Stephanie	Belgium	The steamer was wrecked off Christiansand, Norway.

=== Unknown date ===
List of shipwrecks: Unknownd date in July 1891
Ship	State	Description
Harrier	United Kingdom	Harrier The schooner was wrecked on the Great Barrier Reef.

== August ==
=== 27 August ===
List of shipwrecks: 27 August 1891
Ship	State	Description
John J. Whittier	United States	The schooner was wrecked at Flower's Cove, Newfoundland. Crew was rescued.

=== Unknown date ===
List of shipwrecks: Unknown August 1891
Ship	State	Description
Apostag		The boiler of the Danube Steam Navigation Company screw steamer exploded, causing the ship to sink in the Hungarian portion of the River Danube. Three crew died.
H. A. DeWitt	United States	The schooner was found aground and abandoned four miles (6.4 km) east of St. Andrews Bay, Florida.

== September ==
=== 5 September ===
List of shipwrecks: 5 September 1891
Ship	State	Description
USFC Grampus	United States Fish Commission	The schooner, a fisheries research ship, was on a voyage from Hyannis to Woods Hole, Massachusetts, with U.S. Fish Commissioner Marshall McDonald and his wife and daughter, Assistant U.S. Fish Commissioner J. W. Collins, and two female guests aboard when she ran aground on L'Hommidieu Shoal in Vineyard Sound during a southeasterly storm. McDonald, Collins, McDonald's family members, and the other two women made it safely to Falmouth, Massachusetts, in a dory, and Grampus later was refloated and returned to service.

=== 6 September ===
List of shipwrecks: 6 September 1891
Ship	State	Description
Fiji	United Kingdom	The barque was wrecked at Moonlight Head, Victoria with the loss of twelve of her 26 crew. She was on a voyage from Hamburg, Germany to Melbourne, New South Wales.

=== 7 September ===
List of shipwrecks: 7 September 1891
Ship	State	Description
City Point	United States	Labor Day gale: The schooner was lost with all hands.
Paul and Essie	United States	Labor Day gale: The schooner was wrecked at Black Point, Nova Scotia. Crew saved.
Percy	United States	Labor Day gale: The fishing schooner sank on the Georges Bank in a gale. Lost with all 12 crewmen.

=== 8 September ===
List of shipwrecks: 8 September 1891
Ship	State	Description
Garland	United Kingdom	The 39 ton Penzance ketch, Garland was taking in water while anchored off Lundy. She made for Padstow, beached and became a total wreck, losing 55 tons of salt.

=== 10 September ===
List of shipwrecks: 10 September 1891
Ship	State	Description
Taormina	Italy	The 1594 ton mail steamer, collided with the Greek steamer Thessalia off Gaiduronisi, near Cape Sonium, Greece. Taormina sank with the loss of 70 passengers; 25 were saved.

=== 13 September ===
List of shipwrecks: 13 September 1891
Ship	State	Description
John S. McQuin	United States	The schooner was wrecked near Bath, Maine. Crew saved.

=== 19 September ===
List of shipwrecks: 19 September 1891
Ship	State	Description
Unnamed schooner	Germany	A large, three-masted schooner (Germany), sank when it was run down by a Dutch steamer off Start Point, Devon. The crew were landed at Plymouth.

=== Unknown date ===
List of shipwrecks: Unknown September 1891
Ship	State	Description
Ada	United States	The schooner disappeared on a fishing trip out of Pensacola, Florida. Lost with all five crew.
Amazon		The St. John's schooner was wrecked on the coast of Labrador with the loss of three crew.
Ambassador	United Kingdom	The vessel hit a rock and foundered off Bolt Head, Devon. The crew took to the ships boats and landed at Salcombe.
Camelia		The St John's vessel was lost with all hands on the coast of Labrador.
Earl of Devon	United Kingdom	The barque went ashore at Skaw, Fredrikshavn, while carrying phosphate from Curacao for Memel.
Paislee		The St John's schooner sas lost with all hands on the coast of Labrador.

== October ==
=== 1 October ===
List of shipwrecks: 1 October 1891
Ship	State	Description
Clytie	United States	The schooner went ashore near Matinicus Island, bilged and sank. Crew saved.
Flid	Norway	The steamer caught on fire approximately 200 miles (320 km) from Cape Finisterre and 25 miles (40 km) from Vianna. The crew took to the ships' boats, were taken aboard the Liverpool steamer Reguant and were landed at Penzance, Cornwall.

=== 3 October ===
List of shipwrecks: 3 October 1891
Ship	State	Description
William Lewis	United States	While on an Arctic whaling voyage, the 463-gross register ton, 134-foot (41 m) steam bark was wrecked during a gale and snowstorm off Point Barrow, District of Alaska, when she became stranded on a snow-covered sandspit that her captain mistook for slush ice floating on the sea. The steamers Belvedere and Navarch (flags unknown) rescued her entire crew of 45. During salvage operations, the wreck of William Lewis was destroyed by an accidental fire on 20 March 1892.

=== 10 October ===
List of shipwrecks: 10 October 1891
Ship	State	Description
USS Despatch	United States Navy	The steamer was wrecked without loss of life on Assateague Island off the coast of Virginia during a gale.

=== 13 October ===
List of shipwrecks: 13 October 1891
Ship	State	Description
Ora et Labora	Norway	The brig was driven ashore and wrecked near Chesil Cove, Dorset, United Kingdom.

=== 22 October ===
List of shipwrecks: 22 October 1891
Ship	State	Description
No.18	United Kingdom	The Admiralty dredger broke tow from the fleet tug HMS Seahorse (United Kingdom), on passage from Sheerness to Portsmouth, and was wrecked on the Goodwin Sands, off the South Foreland, in the southern North Sea.

=== Unknown date ===
List of shipwrecks: Unknown date October 1891
Ship	State	Description
Red Wing		The schooner was driven ashore and wrecked on the coast of Delaware just south of the Indian River Inlet during a gale, killing her entire crew of six.

== November ==
=== 9 November ===
List of shipwrecks: 9 November 1891
Ship	State	Description
Maude M. Lane	United States	The schooner barge sank 95 miles (153 km) south southwest of Pensacola, Florida.

=== 11 November ===
List of shipwrecks: 11 November 1891
Ship	State	Description
Benvenue	United Kingdom	The full-rigged ship was driven ashore and wrecked at Sandgate, Kent with the loss of five lives. Twenty-seven survivors were rescued by the lifeboat Mayer de Rothchild ( Royal National Lifeboat Institution).
Rappahannock	United States	The full-rigged ship caught fire due to spontaneous combustion in her cargo of coal and was beached and burned out in Cumberland Bay, Juan Fernandez Island, Juan Fernandez Islands, Chile. The captain, his wife, two daughters, and 30 crew were eventually rescued by the government steamer Huemial (Chile).

=== 15 November ===
List of shipwrecks: 15 November 1891
Ship	State	Description
Minnie Davis	United States	The schooner was sunk in a collision with the schooner Hunter Savidge (United States) 1 1/2 miles (2.4 km) off Point Morvia Light or Bar Point, in Lake Erie. The wreck was blown up in April 1893 as a hazard to navigation.

=== 22 November ===
List of shipwrecks: 22 November 1891
Ship	State	Description
Samuel Mather	United States	The wooden steam cargo ship sank after she was rammed by the steel cargo ship Brazil (flag unknown) in heavy fog in Whitefish Bay, Lake Superior.

== December ==
=== 4 December ===
List of shipwrecks: 4 December 1891
Ship	State	Description
Ogemaw	United States	The steam barge sprung a leak and sank between Point Peninsula and Poverty Passage in 65 feet of water. Raised in 1893, rebuilt and returned to service in 1894.

=== 5 December ===
List of shipwrecks: 5 December 1891
Ship	State	Description
Merannio	United Kingdom	En route for Newport from Bilbao with a cargo of 1,300 tons of iron ore, the ship hit the Seven Stones Reef, but managed to reach St Ives, Cornwall where a 10 ft (3 m) hole was found in her bow.

=== 8 December ===
List of shipwrecks: 8 December 1891
Ship	State	Description
Torbay Lass	United Kingdom	After unloading her cargo of coal on St Michael's Mount, the Brixham schooner was under tow by the tug Merlin (flag unknown) when Merlin suffered a drop in steam pressure and Torbay Lass drifted onto the Cressars off the promenade at Penzance, Cornwall, England, United Kingdom. The steamship Lady of the Isles (United Kingdom) pulled her clear, but she sank after a few hundred yards, within a few hundred metres of Penzance harbour.

=== 10 December ===
List of shipwrecks: 10 December 1891
Ship	State	Description
Drumblair	United Kingdom	The ship was driven ashore on Sully Island, Glamorgan. Her crew either took to the ships' boats or were rescued by the lifeboat Joseph Denman II ( Royal National Lifeboat Institution). Drumblair was on a voyage from Barry, Glamorgan to Mauritius. She was later salvaged, repaired and returned to service.

=== 18 December ===
List of shipwrecks: 18 December 1891
Ship	State	Description
Abyssinia	United Kingdom	The cargo liner burned and sank in Mid Atlantic Ocean, no casualties. All rescued by Spree (German Empire).

=== 23 December ===
List of shipwrecks: 23 December 1891
Ship	State	Description
Felicete	France	The brig ran aground at Port Eynon Point, Glamorgan, United Kingdom, and was wrecked. Her crew survived. She was on a voyage from Nantes, Loire-Inférieure to Swansea, Glamorgan.
Oakland	New South Wales	The passenger-cargo ship ran aground on the southern breakwater at Ballina, New South Wales, Australia. She was refloated, repaired, and returned to service.

=== 29 December ===
List of shipwrecks: 29 December 1891
Ship	State	Description
Dexter Clark	United States	The schooner sank after bottoming on Flug Island Shoals near the West Pass of Apalachicola Bay, Florida.
Maggie	United Kingdom	The sailing vessel collided with the passenger-cargo steamer Inishtrahull (United Kingdom) in the Irish Sea just off the Kish Bank off the east coast of Ireland. Her crew were rescued by Inishtrahull, after which Maggie drifted away in a sinking condition and probably sank somewhere near the Kish Lighthouse.

=== Unknown date ===
List of shipwrecks: Unknown December 1891
Ship	State	Description
White Rose	United Kingdom	the 500 ton vessel disappeared while on a voyage from France to Liverpool. The remains of the wreck was observed on the Udder Rock, Lansallos, Cornwall some months later. All eleven on board are presumed to have perished.

== Unknown date ==
List of shipwrecks: Unknown date 1891
Ship	State	Description
Annie	United Kingdom	A steamer carrying wood from Sävenäs, near Skellefteä, to Sutton Bridge ran aground off Umeå due to navigational error. The ship was taken under tow but sank. The crew was rescued.
Sarsfield	United Kingdom	The brigantine ran aground at Rhosilli, Glamorgan, Wales, and was wrecked. All seven people on board survived.
Sea Serpent	United States	The clipper's crew of 17 abandoned her at sea at (46°N 40°W) and were rescued by the barque Gulnare (flag unknown). The derelict Sea Serpent was sighted on 18 October by the barque Ardgowan (flag unknown), having drifted 1,120 miles (1,800 km) unmanned in 93 days. Sea Serpent was sighted 19 times before disappearing.
