= Fortune-class tugboat =

Tugboats of the Union and US Navy

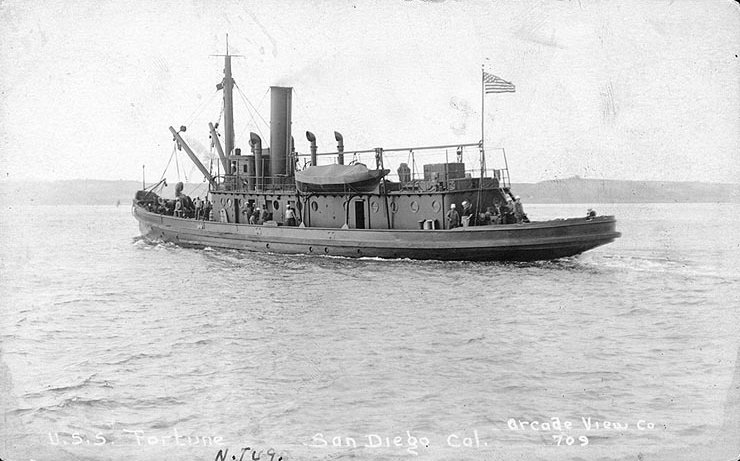
- Lead of her class USS Fortune off San Diego

Class overview
- Name: Fortune class
- Operators: Union Navy; United States Navy
- Completed: 9
- Retired: 9

General characteristics
- Class & type: Tugboat
- Displacement: 420 tons
- Length: 137 feet (42 m)
- Beam: 26 feet (7.9 m)
- Draft: 9.5 feet (2.9 m)
- Complement: 52
- Armament: 2 × 3 lb (1.4 kg)

The Pinta or Fortune-class was a series of nine tugboats built to support the Anaconda Plan during the American Civil War. The Union Navy built the ships to maneuverer blockading warships, although most of the class was completed after the war. The vessels served as yard craft through the rest of the century, and several ships were refitted to serve as gunboats, training ships, or experimental torpedo boats.

== Development and design ==
During the American Civil War, the Union Navy aimed to blockade the Confederate States into submission. To maneuver blockading warships, it needed a fleet of tugboats. By 1864, the existing fleet of small, wooden-hull, weak riverine boats were unsatisfactory. To address the issue, a series of iron-hull, propeller-driven tugboats were ordered. The largest design became known as the Fortune or Pinta-class tugboat.

The class had an overall length of 137 feet (42 m), beam of 26 feet (7.9 m), depth of 9.5 feet (2.9 m), displacement of 420 tons, and a crew of 52. One vertical compound steam engine turned a propeller that could produce a top speed of 10 knots (19 km/h; 12 mph). The ships were armed with two 3 lb (1.4 kg) guns.

== Ships in class ==
Data
Name	Builder	Launched	Commissioned
Fortune	James Tetlow, Boston	23 Mar 1865	19 May 1871
Leyden	James Tetlow, Boston	1865	1865
Mayflower	James Tetlow, Boston	1865	Feb 1866
Nina	Reaney, Son & Archbold, Chester, Pennsylvania	27 May 1865	30 Sep 1865
Palos	James Tetlow, Boston	1864	11 Jun 1870
Pinta	Reaney, Son & Archbold, Chester, Pennsylvania	29 Oct 1864	Oct 1865
Speedwell	James Tetlow, Boston	1865	13 Nov 1865
Standish	James Tetlow, Boston	26 Oct 1864	1865
Triana	William Perrine, Williambsurg, Pennsylvania	29 Apr 1865	25 Oct 1865

== Service history ==
The class had all been completed by 1871. Leyden, Nina, Pinta, and Speedwell spent their entire careers as yard tugs in various shipyards across the US. Fortune and Triana were converted into experimental spar torpedo boats in 1871 and Palos was rebuilt as a gunboat that saw action in the Western Pacific. After serving as tugboats, Mayflower and Standish were used as training ships at the US Naval Academy.
