= Kaffraria (disambiguation) =

Kaffraria ("Land of the Kaffirs") was a name for regions held by the Xhosa outside the authority of British South Africa, particularly the southeast part of South Africa's Eastern Cape.

Kaffraria may also refer to:

- Other areas held by the Xhosa in what is now Transkei
- Diocese of Kaffraria, now renamed Mthatha
- Cafreria, a vague territory during the Age of Exploration usually including the Namibian coast and surrounding areas
- British Kaffraria, a formally established colony beside the Kaffraria described above
- SS Kaffraria, a British cargo ship
- Kaffraria, a genus of shield bugs in the tribe Phyllocephalini
