= USS Speedwell =

Tugboat of the US Navy

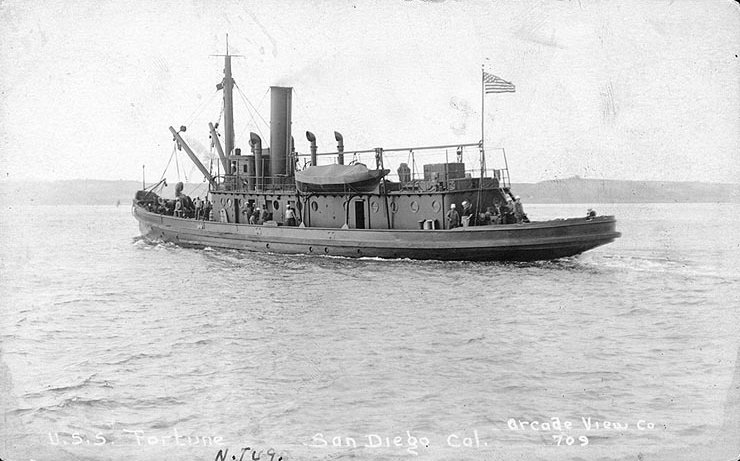
- Speedwell's sister ship Fortune

History

United States
- Name: Speedwall
- Builder: James Tetlow, Boston
- Launched: 1865
- Commissioned: 13 November 1865
- Decommissioned: 19 December 1890
- Fate: Sold, March 1891

General characteristics
- Class & type: Tugboat
- Displacement: 420 tons
- Length: 137 feet (42 m)
- Beam: 26 feet (7.9 m)
- Draft: 9.5 feet (2.9 m)
- Complement: 52
- Armament: 2 × 3 lb (1.4 kg)

USS Speedwell was a Fortune-class tugboat of the United States Navy. Ordered to support the Anaconda Plan during the American Civil War, she was commissioned too late to see action and instead operated as a yard craft in various US Navy shipyards before she was decommissioned in 1890.

== Development and design ==
During the American Civil War, the Union Navy aimed to blockade the Confederate States into submission. To maneuver blockading warships, it needed a fleet of tugboats. By 1864, the existing fleet of small, wooden-hull, weak riverine boats were unsatisfactory. To address the issue, a series of iron-hull, propeller-driven tugboats were ordered. The largest design became known as the Fortune or Pinta-class tugboat.

She had an overall length of 137 feet (42 m), beam of 26 feet (7.9 m), depth of 9.5 feet (2.9 m), displacement of 420 tons, and a crew of 52. One vertical compound steam engine turned a propeller that could produce a top speed of 10 knots (19 km/h; 12 mph), and the tugboat was armed with two 3 lb (1.4 kg) guns.

== Service history ==
Speedwell was laid down at the shipyard of James Tetlow in Boston, was launched sometime in 1865, and commissioned on 13 November 1865. Speedwell arrived at the Portsmouth Navy Yard on the day she was commissioned, and operated as a yard tug for the next decade. Sometime between 1876 and 1880, she was reassigned to Washington DC. In 1884, she was transferred to the Norfolk Navy Yard. On 19 December 1890, she was retired and was sold off in March 1891 as a hulk.
