= Otterndorf =

- Town
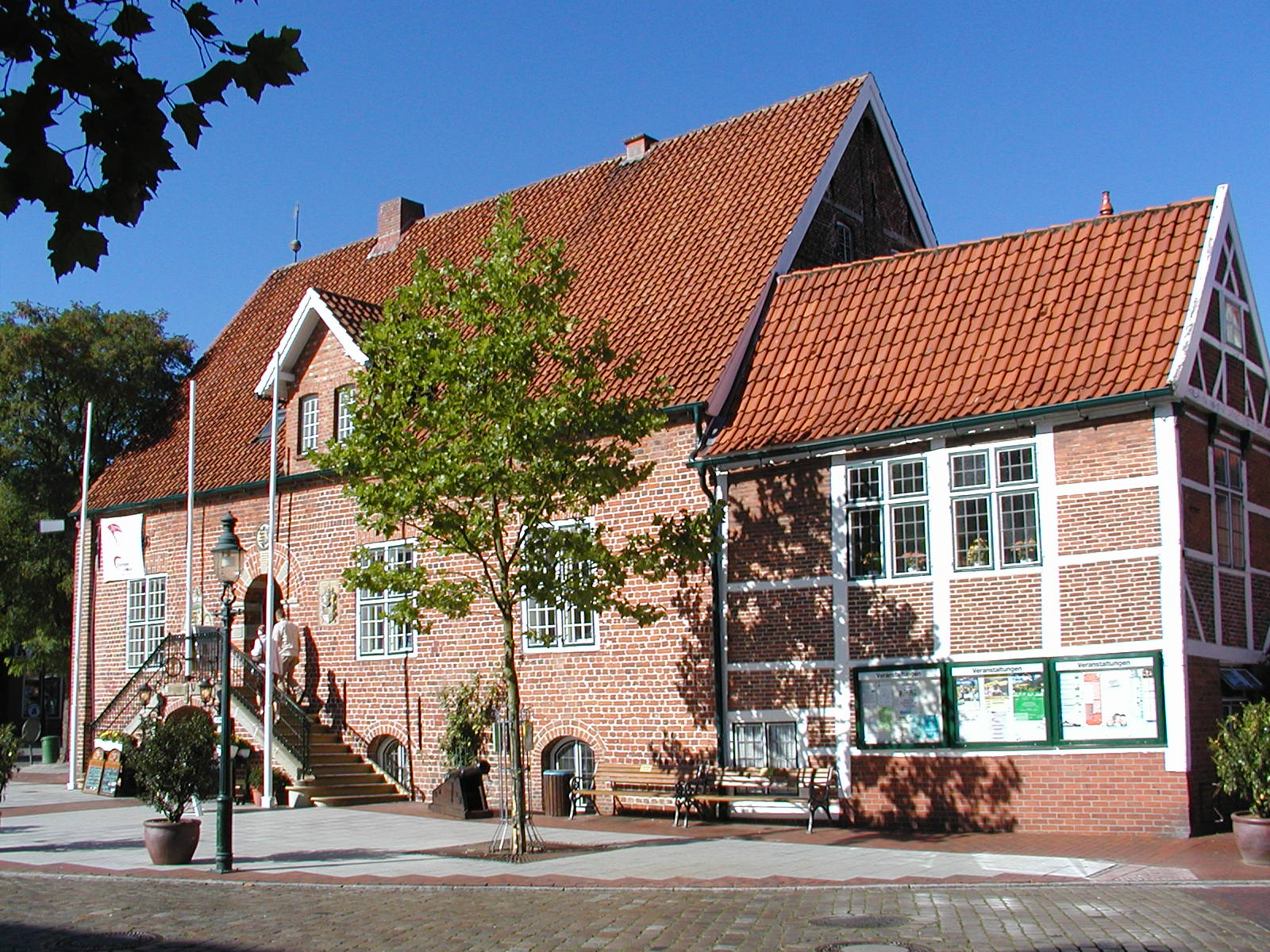
- Town hall

- Coat of arms

- Location of Otterndorf within Cuxhaven district
- Interactive map of Otterndorf
- Location within Germany Location within Lower Saxony
- Coordinates: 53°48′N 8°54′E
- Country: Germany
- State: Lower Saxony
- District: Cuxhaven
- Municipal assoc.: Land Hadeln

Government
  - Mayor: Thomas Bullwinkel (CDU)

Area
  - Total: 33.55 km^{2} (12.95 sq mi)
- Elevation: 0–6 m (0–20 ft)

Population (2025-12-31)
  - Total: 7,690
  - Density: 229/km^{2} (594/sq mi)
- Time zone: UTC+01:00 (CET)
  - Summer (DST): UTC+02:00 (CEST)
- Postal codes: 21762
- Dialling codes: 04751
- Vehicle registration: CUX
- Website: www.otterndorf.de

Otterndorf (German: [ˈɔtɐndɔʁf]; Low German: Ot(t)erndörp) is a town on the coast of the North Sea in the federal state of Lower Saxony, Germany, and is part of the collective municipality (Samtgemeinde) of Land Hadeln. The town, located in the administrative district (Landkreis) of Cuxhaven, is at the mouth of the river Medem, part of the Elbe delta. The old town centre (Altstadt) features a number of half-timbered houses.

== History ==
Otterndorf belongs to the Land of Hadeln, first an exclave of the younger Duchy of Saxony and after its de facto dynastic partition in 1296 of the Duchy of Saxe-Lauenburg, established de jure in 1260. The first written evidence of the town of Otterndorf dates from the year 1261 in a document written by Godefridus who was a Priest. In 1400, Otterndorf was granted city rights by Eric IV, Duke of Saxe-Lauenburg.

In 1728 Emperor Charles VI enfeoffed the George II Augustus and his House of Hanover in personal union with the reverted fief of Saxe-Lauenburg. By a redeployment of Hanoverian territories in 1731 the Hanoverian Duchies of Bremen and Verden were conveyed the administration of the neighboured Land of Hadeln. The Kingdom of Hanover incorporated the Land of Hadeln in a real union and its territory, including Otterndorf, became part of the new Stade Region, established in 1823.

== The Crane House ==
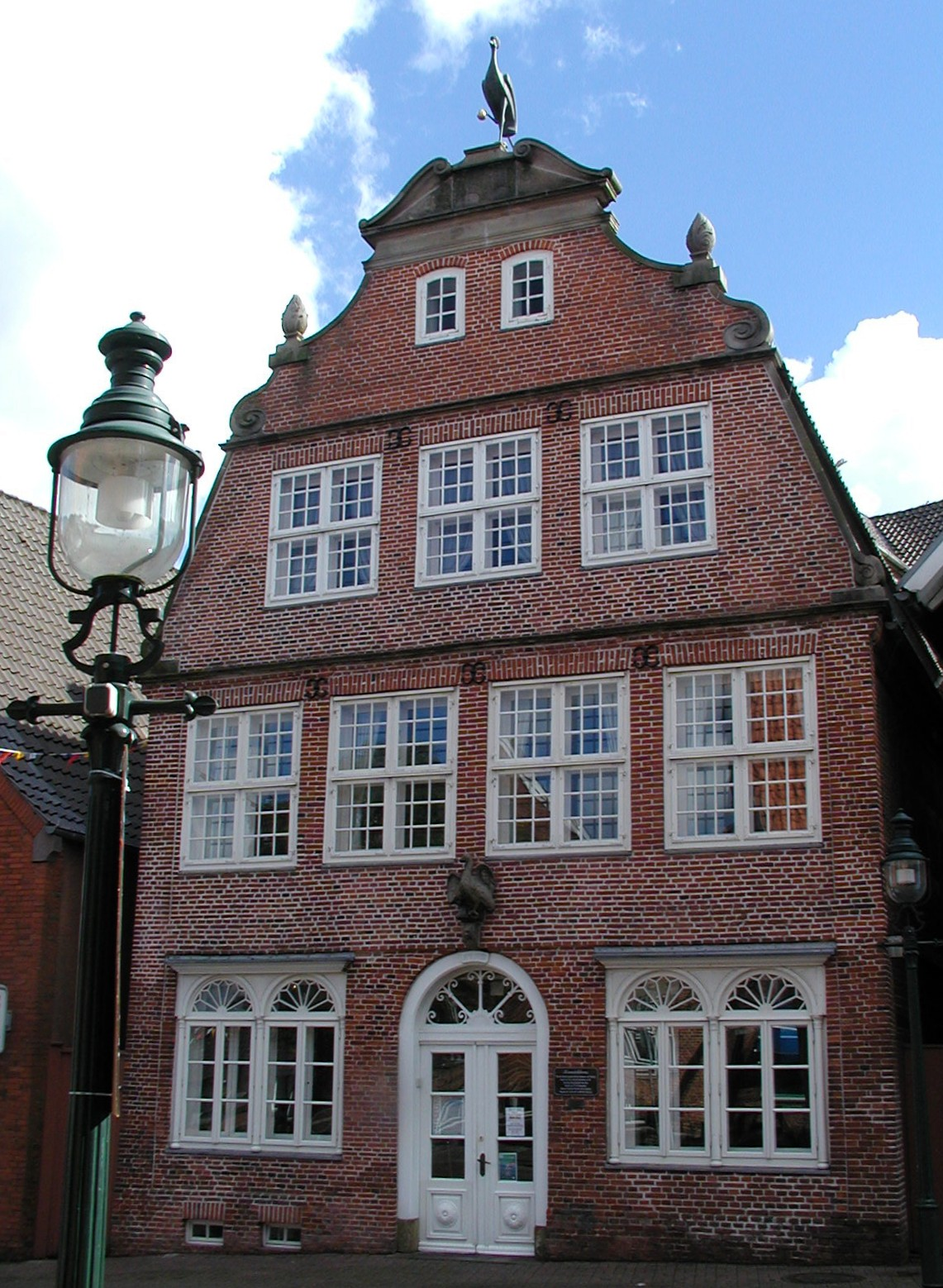
The Crane House, Otterndorf

One of Otterndorf's prominent buildings is in the oldest part of the town and is called the Crane House. This building dates from 1735 although its present façade dates from the later year of 1760. Once owned by the Radiek family the building was the focal point of this successful family business. The family traded in wine, salt and other spices. The crane effigy atop the house which is the building's namesake was placed there by Elizabeth Radiek in memory of her late husband. The Crane House today is the location of a museum dedicated the country life of Hadeln, as well as a local history archive.
Another old building in the town is the Latin school. This unusual building dates from 1614. For many years this school provided the only education for the children of the Hadeln farmers and Otterndorf citizens who could not afford to send their children to schools that charged tuition. The building once boasted a bell which hung from a roof timber on the front but has unfortunately been lost over the years. The school's headmaster from 1778 until 1792 was the German poet and translator Johann Heinrich Voss.

In many of the brick gables of the old buildings of the town, there has been incorporated into the brickwork the patterned shape of a witches broom. The superstitious residents of the town believed the “thunder broom” would ward off evil spirits and forces.

Other prominent buildings in the town include:

- The Yellow Baroque House, which until 1768 was the home of the Courthouse Director.
- The City Hall, recently restored, displays oil paintings by Karl Otto Matthaei, Carl Long and Karl Hein.

== The sinking of SS Kaffraria ==
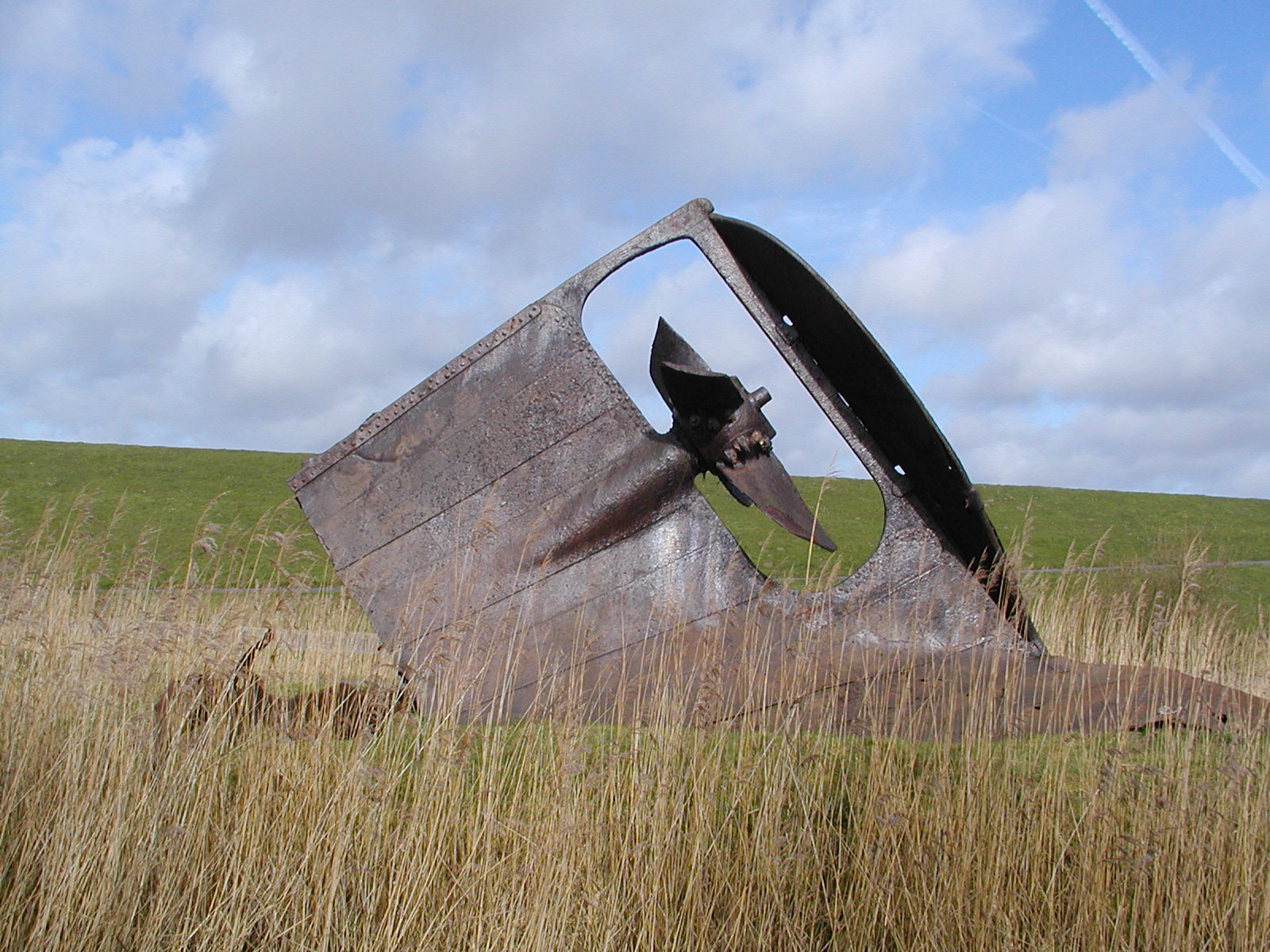
The remains of SS Kaffraria

A British cargo ship by the name of SS Kaffraria owned by Bailey & Leetham of Hull ran aground at Otterndorf on 7 January 1891. The ship had a cargo of general export goods such as kitchen utensils, children's toys, bundles of wool, hand tools and all kinds of domestic appliances. This precious cargo was very swiftly removed by the local residents by both legal and illegal methods. The ship sank during the evening of 8 January. The wreck became a threat to shipping and was removed in 1984. The stern of the ship with the rudder and screw can be seen today at Otterndorf.

== The Church of St Severi ==
The church of the town of Otterndorf is called St Severi. It is believed that there has been a church on this site since the 11th century but the first document evidence of a church comes from 1261 when a place of worship is mentioned by the priest Godefridus. The church bell tower dates from 1807. Inside the church there is a richly decorated altar in the Baroque style which dates from 1649. There is also a pulpit which incorporates a gallery, both are highly decorated and date from 1644. The present church organ was built by Christoph Dietrich Gloger in 1740 and was restored in 1976. The church has a sermon chair that is decorated with biblical figures and was constructed in 1661 by Juergen Heydtmann. The font is made from solid bronze and dates from the middle of the 14th century.

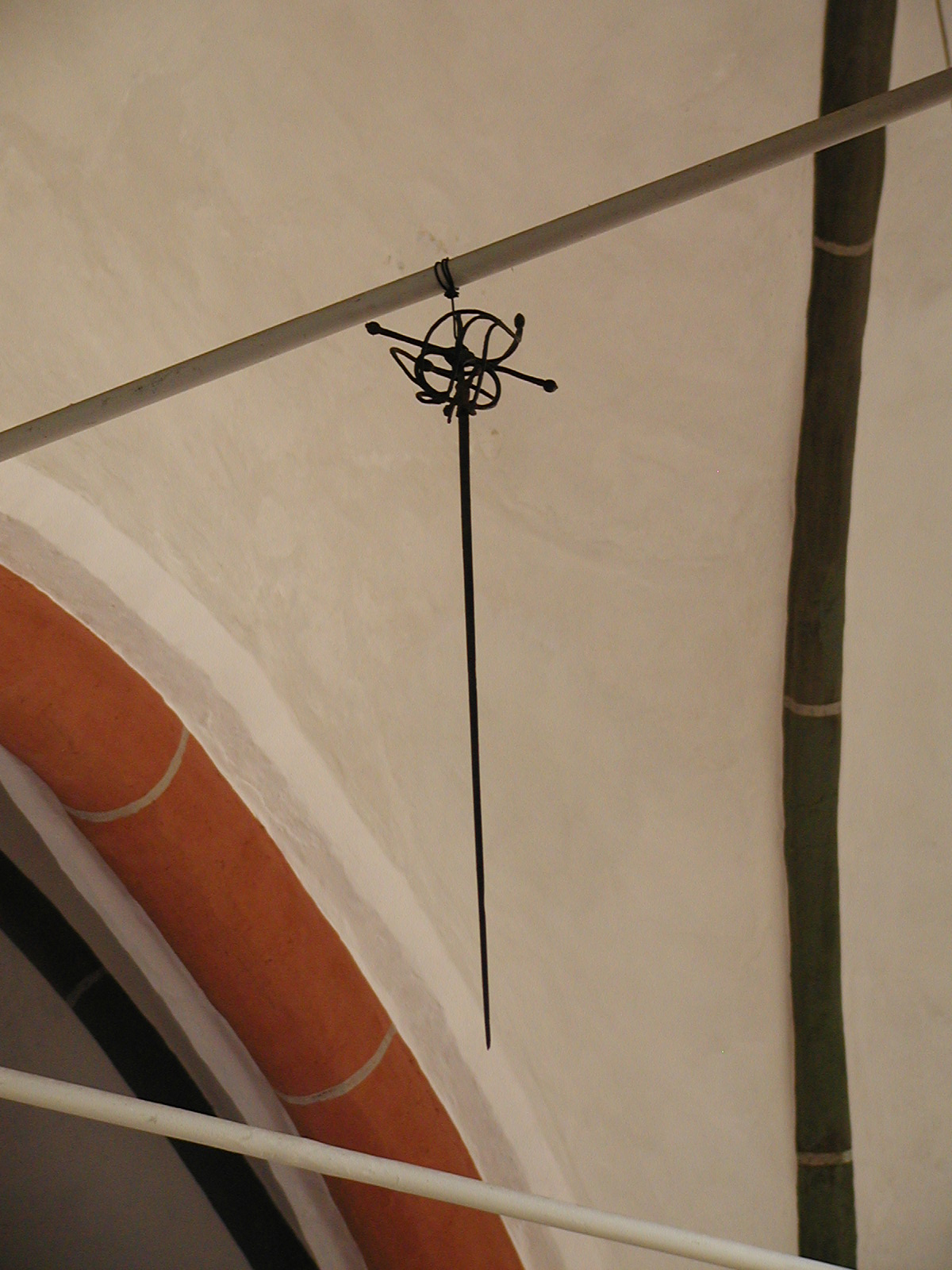
The legendary Sword

== The saga of the Knight Macke ==
Hanging from the ceiling in the church is the rapier or Degen of a knight by the name of Macke. The legend of this relic comes from the time of witch burnings in the town of Otterndorf. The knight was in the service of a middle prince away from Hadeln, but the knight had learnt that his mother back in Otterndorf had been accused of witchcraft, found guilty, and so was to be burnt at the stake at the east gate of the town. The knight, who knew his mother was no witch, hurried back to seek a pardon from the Duke of Lauenburg, with whom he was in good favor. The duke, who appreciated the merits of the knight, granted a written pardon for his mother. The knight quickly rode to Otterndorf, but arrived too late to save his mother. Full of pain and heartache, the knight in his despair thrust the rapier into his chest and killed himself. The citizens of the town, realizing the mistake they had made, hung the blood soaked sword in the church, and the town never burnt a witch again.

=== Economy ===
Otterndorf today is a popular tourist resort. There are several bathing lakes near the beach, campsites, numerous holiday apartments and a youth hostel in and around Otterndorf. The town is a centre of tourism in the so-called Cuxland.

=== Galleries ===
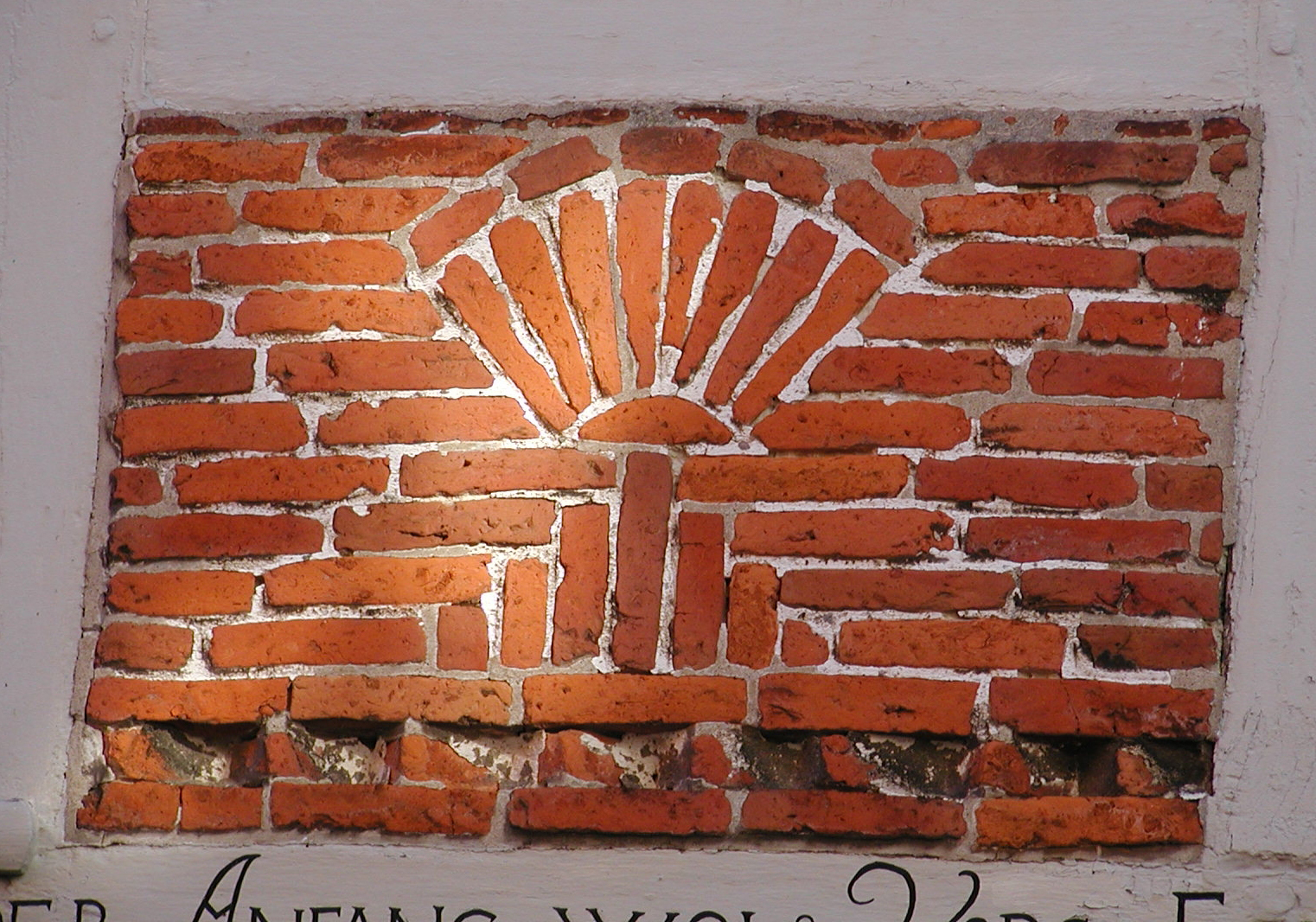
The Thunder Broom Pattern

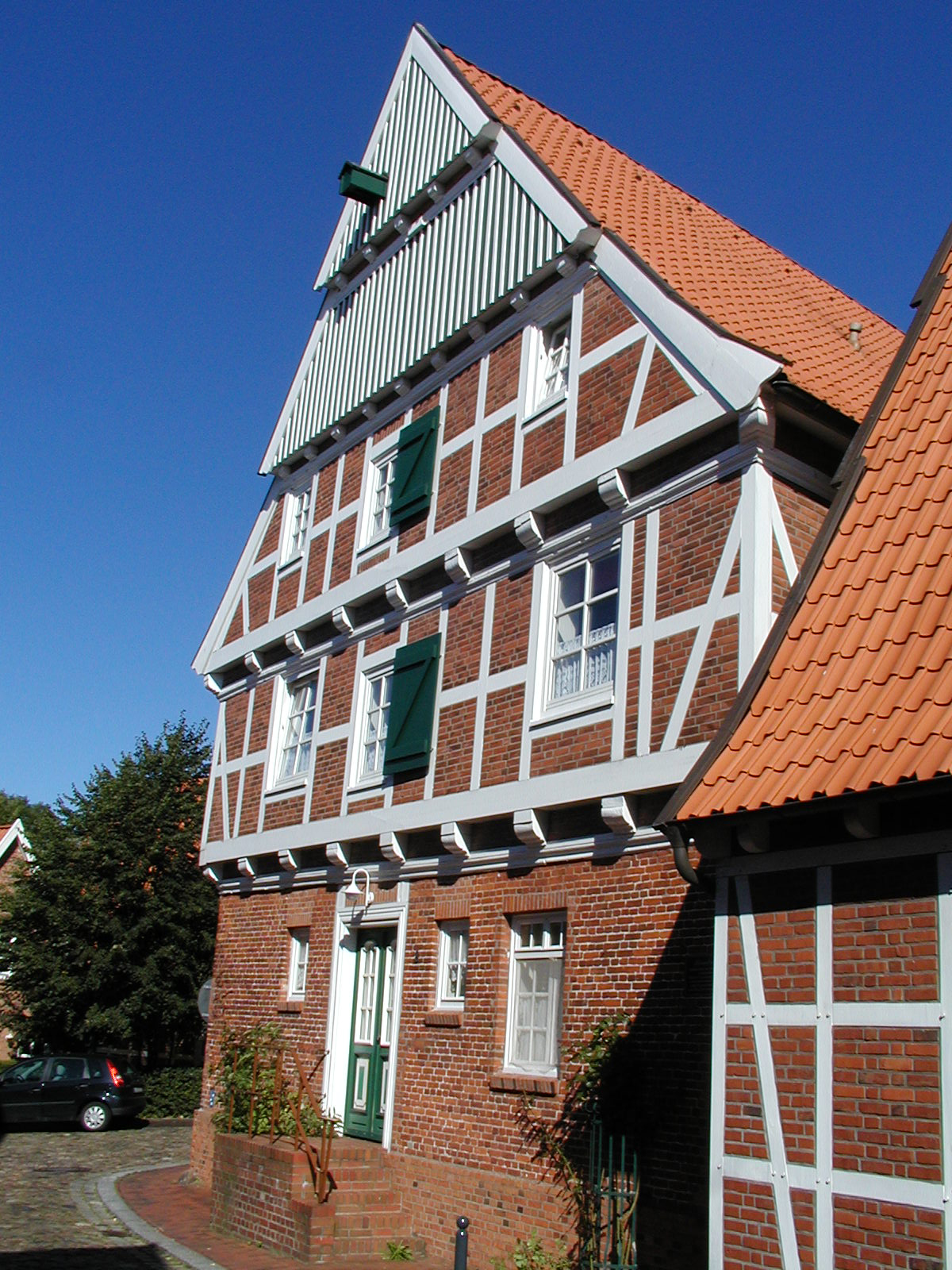
The Bullscher House

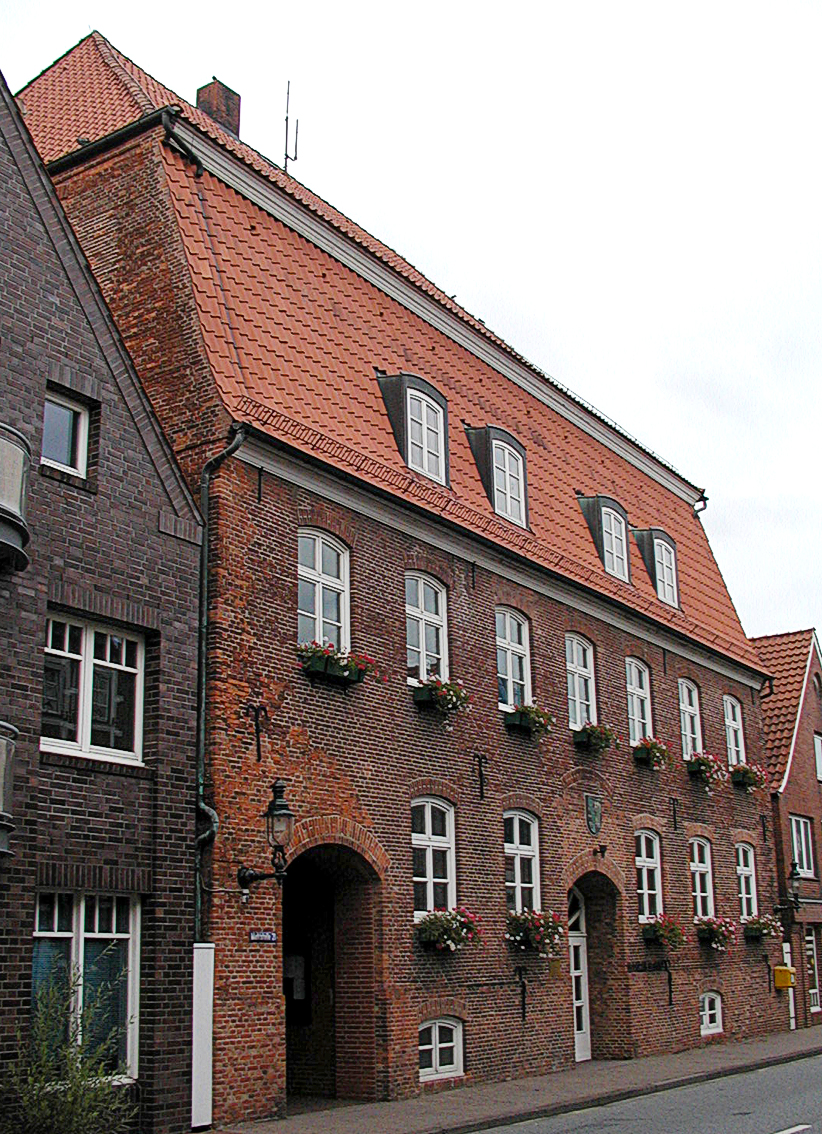
The Hadler House, now a Museum

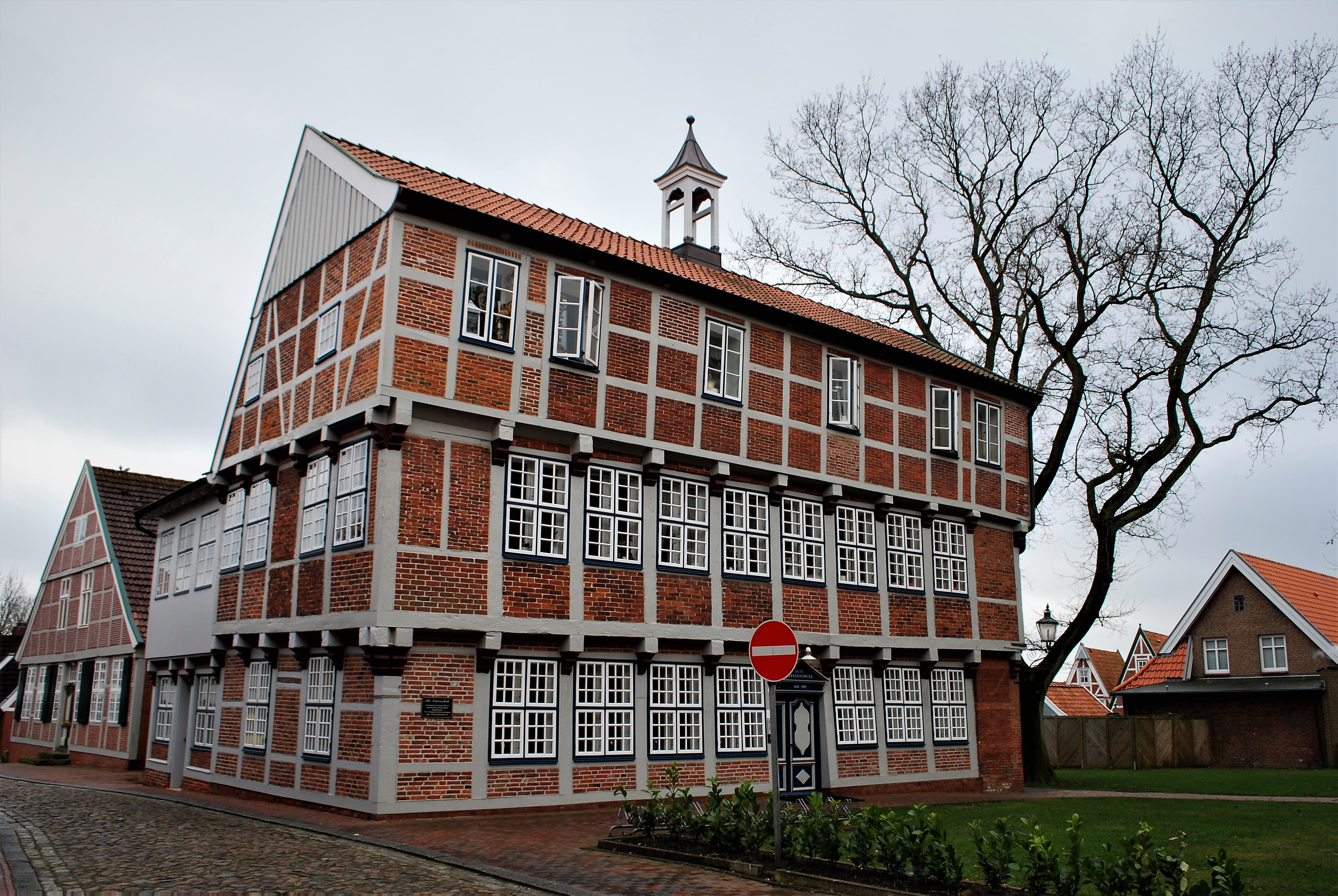
The Latin School

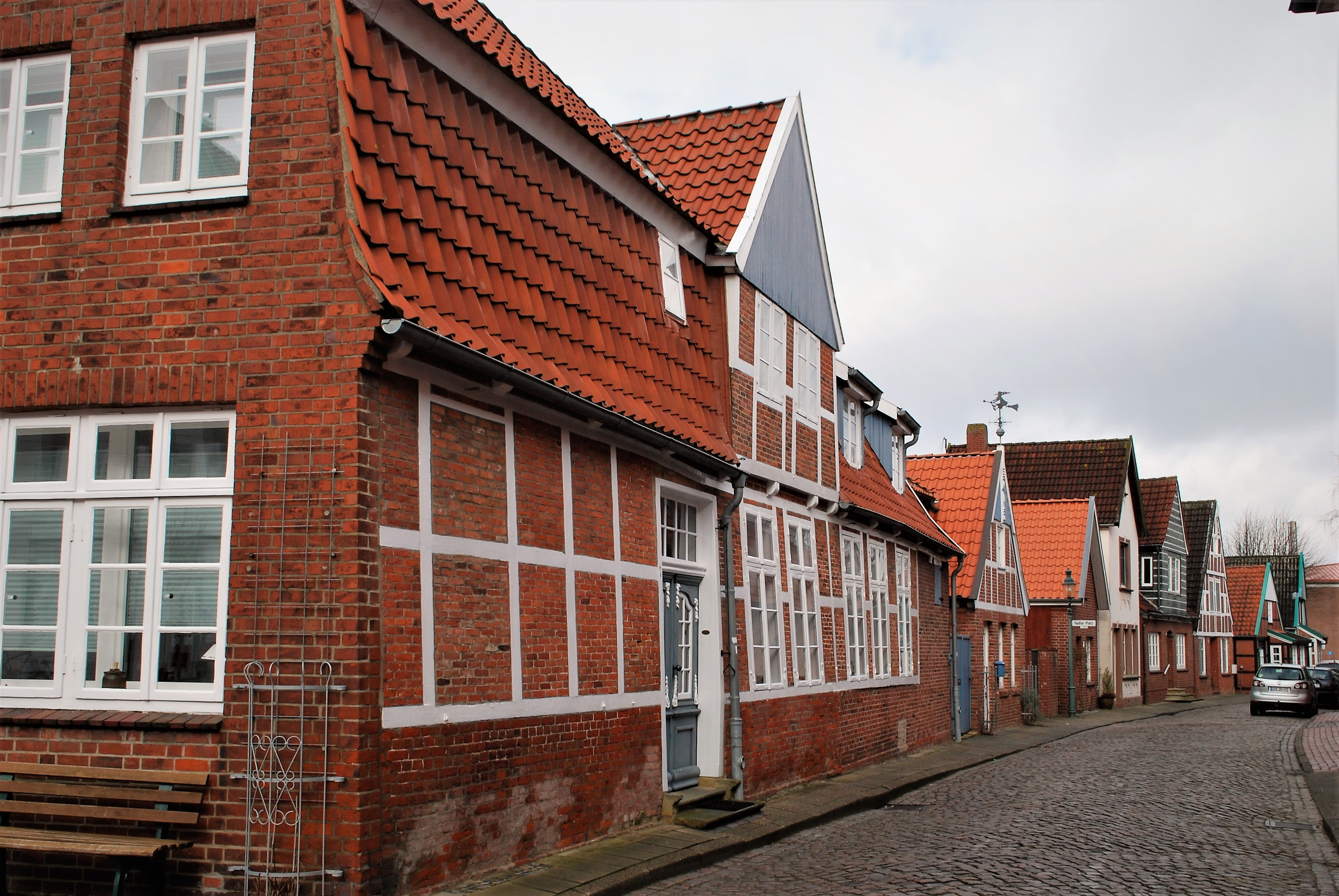
Otterndorf

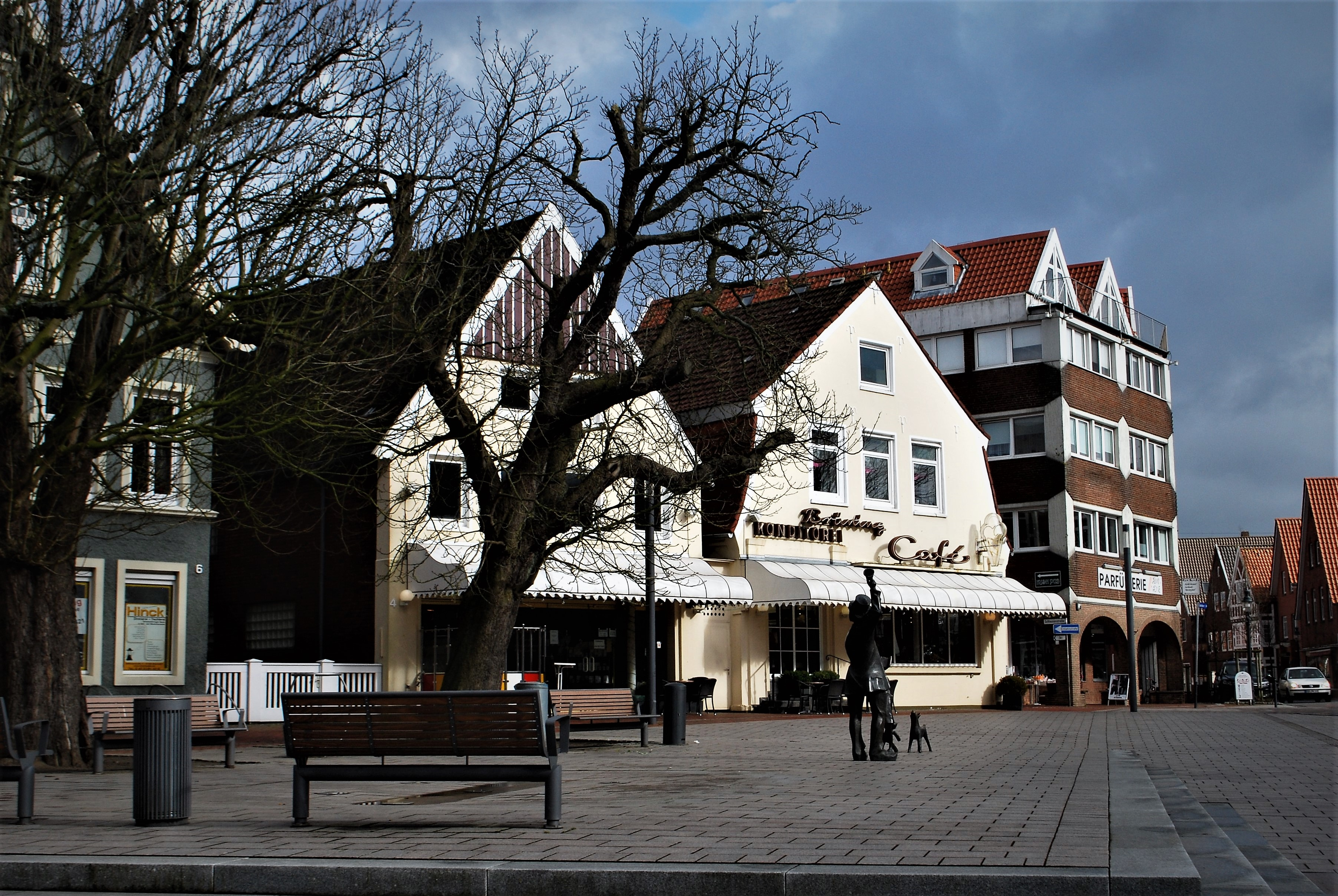
Otterndorf Kirchplatz

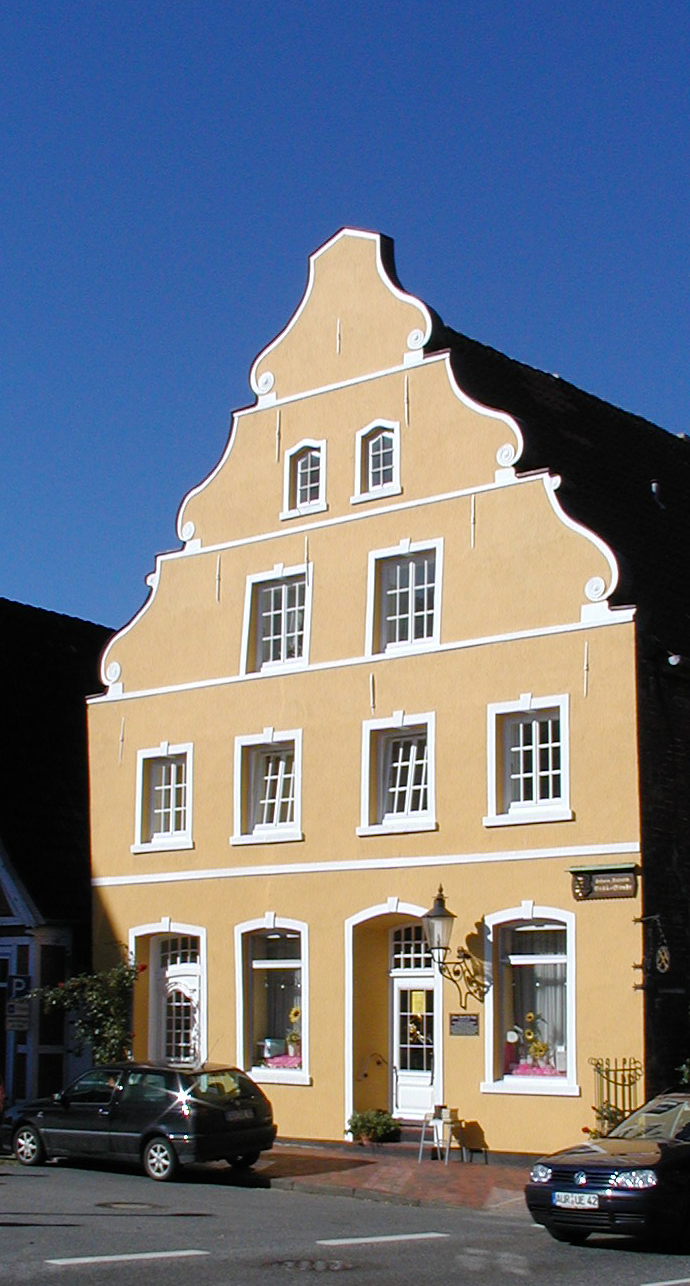
The Yellow Baroque House

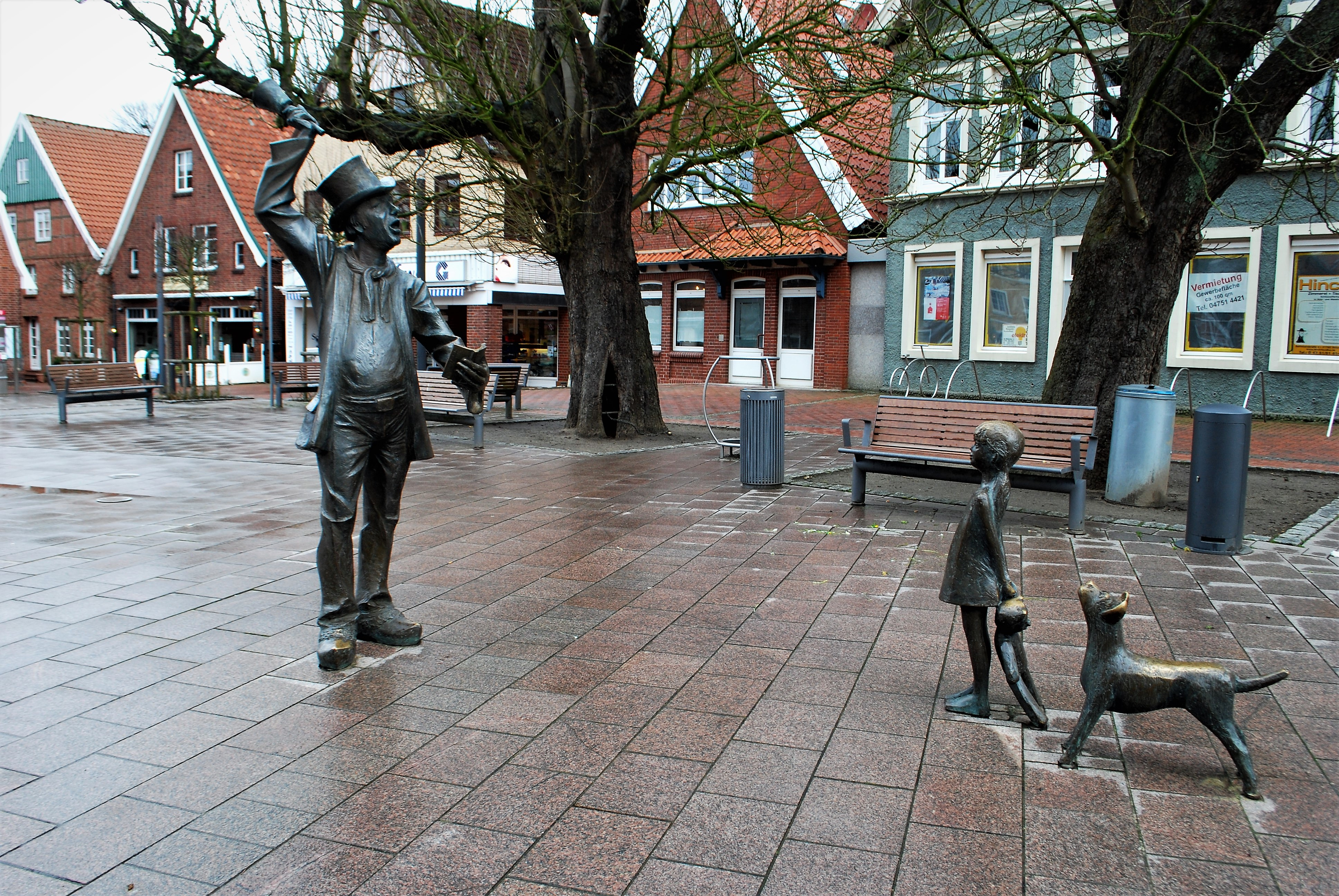
De Utröper (The Town Crier)

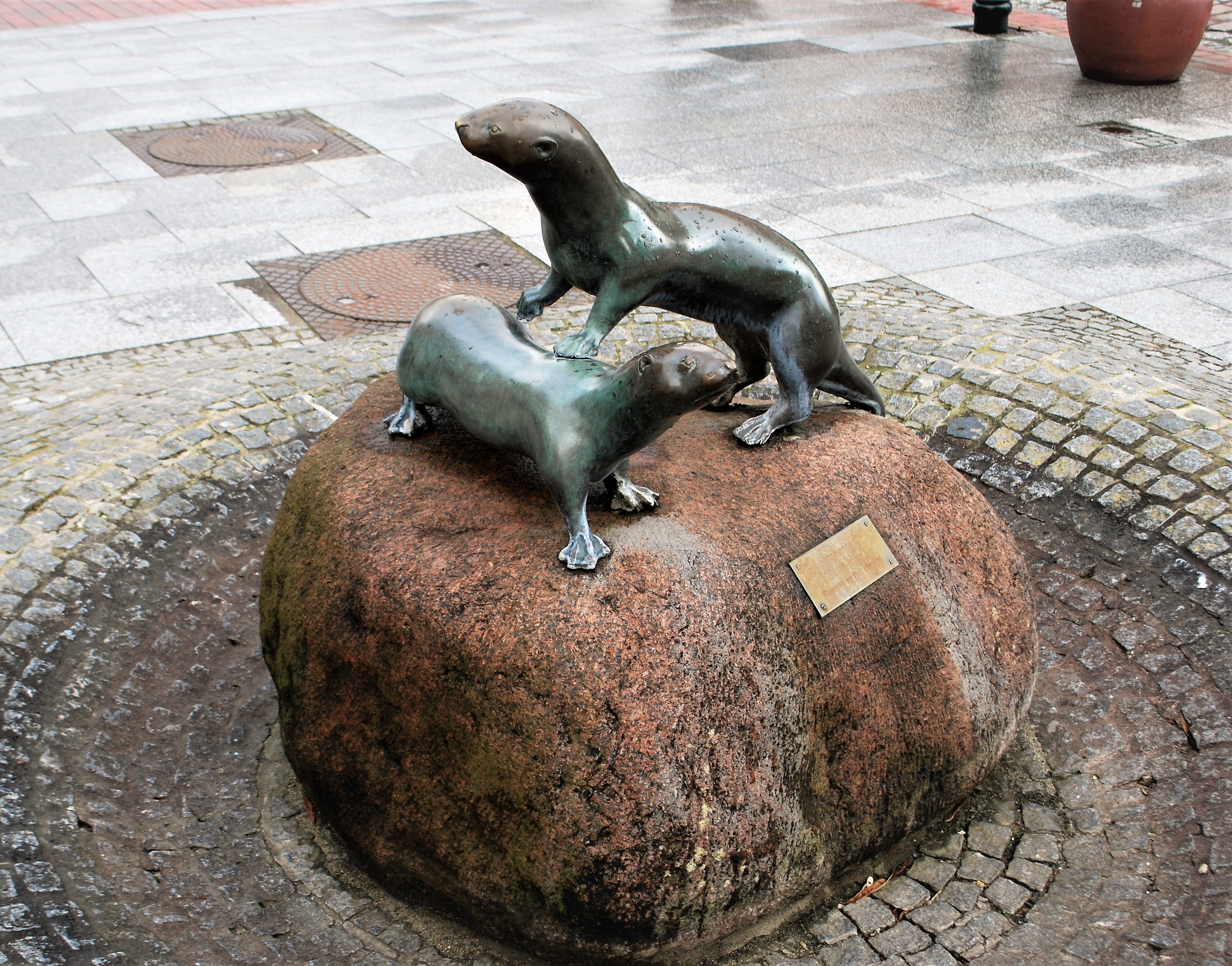
Otterndorf (Otter Fountain).

=== Gallery of the Church ===
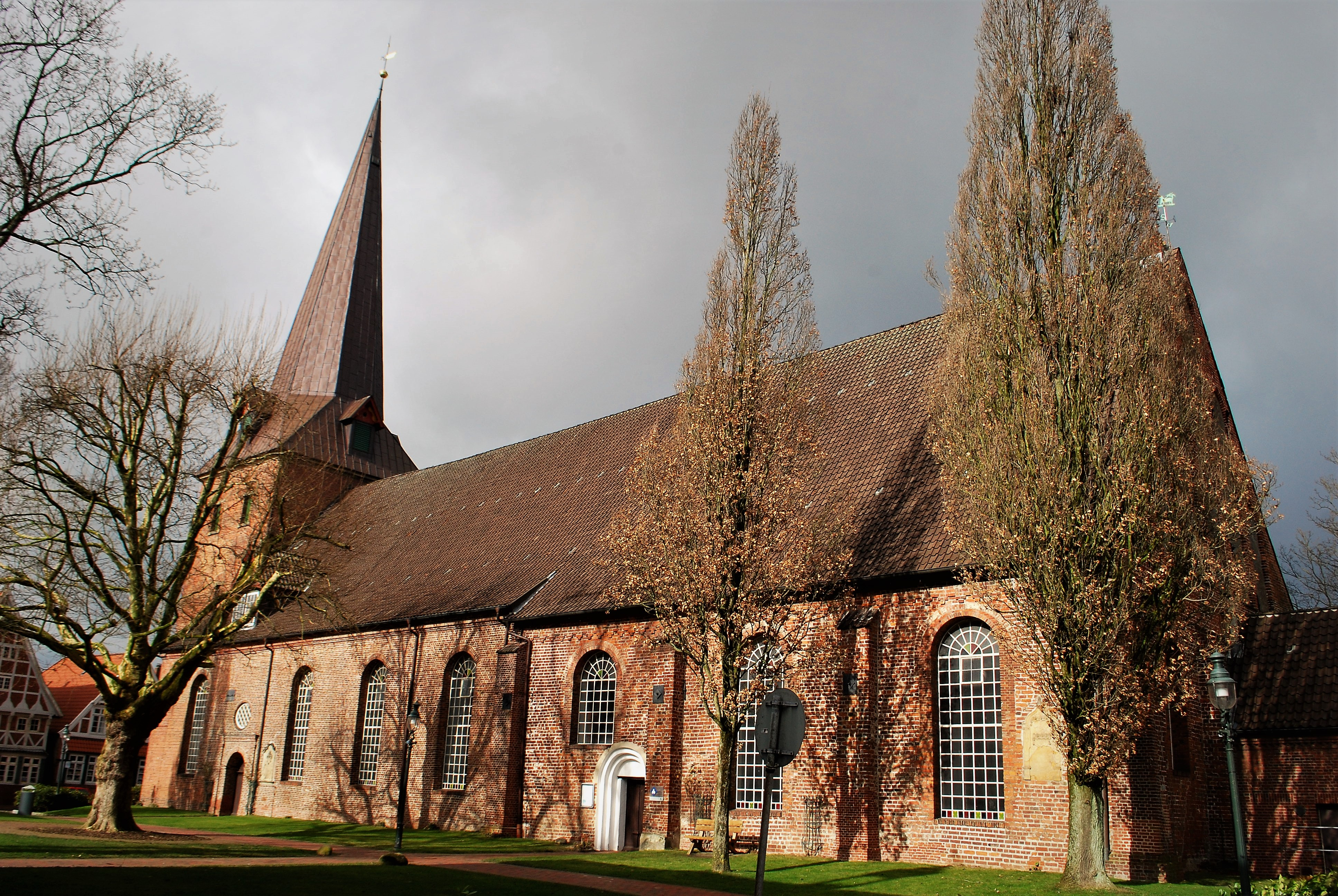
The Church of St Severi

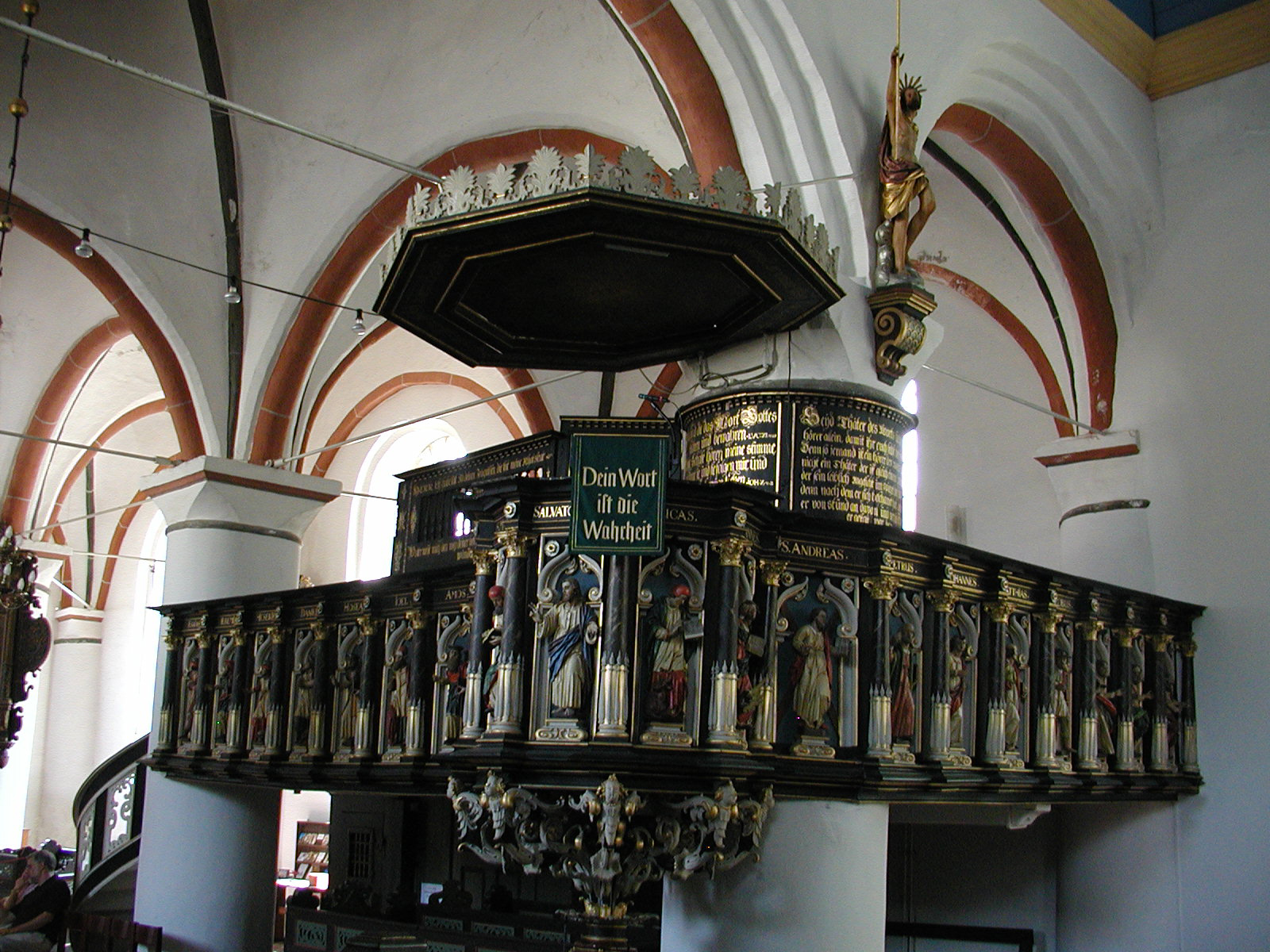
The Pulpit and Gallery

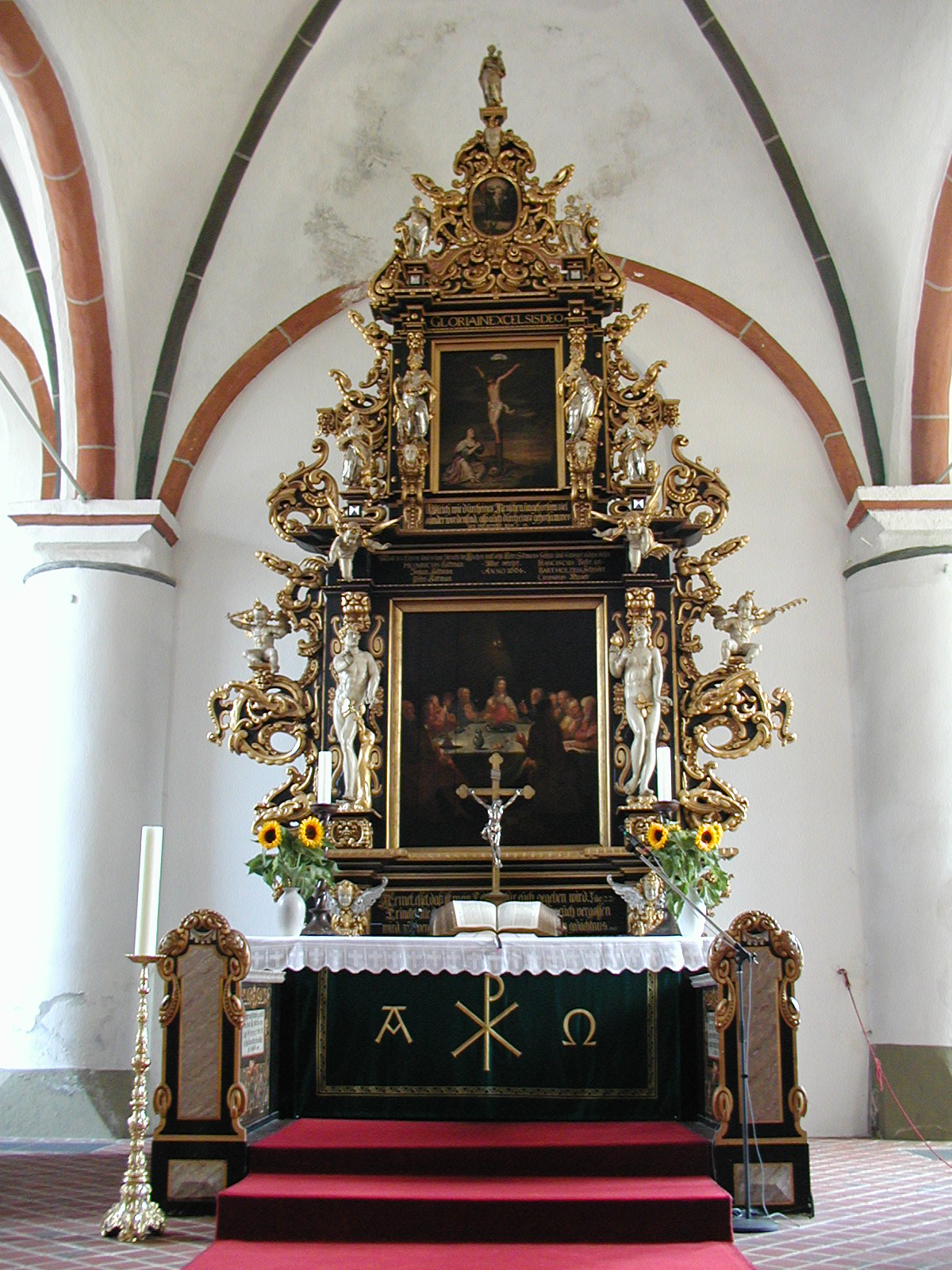
The Baroque Altar

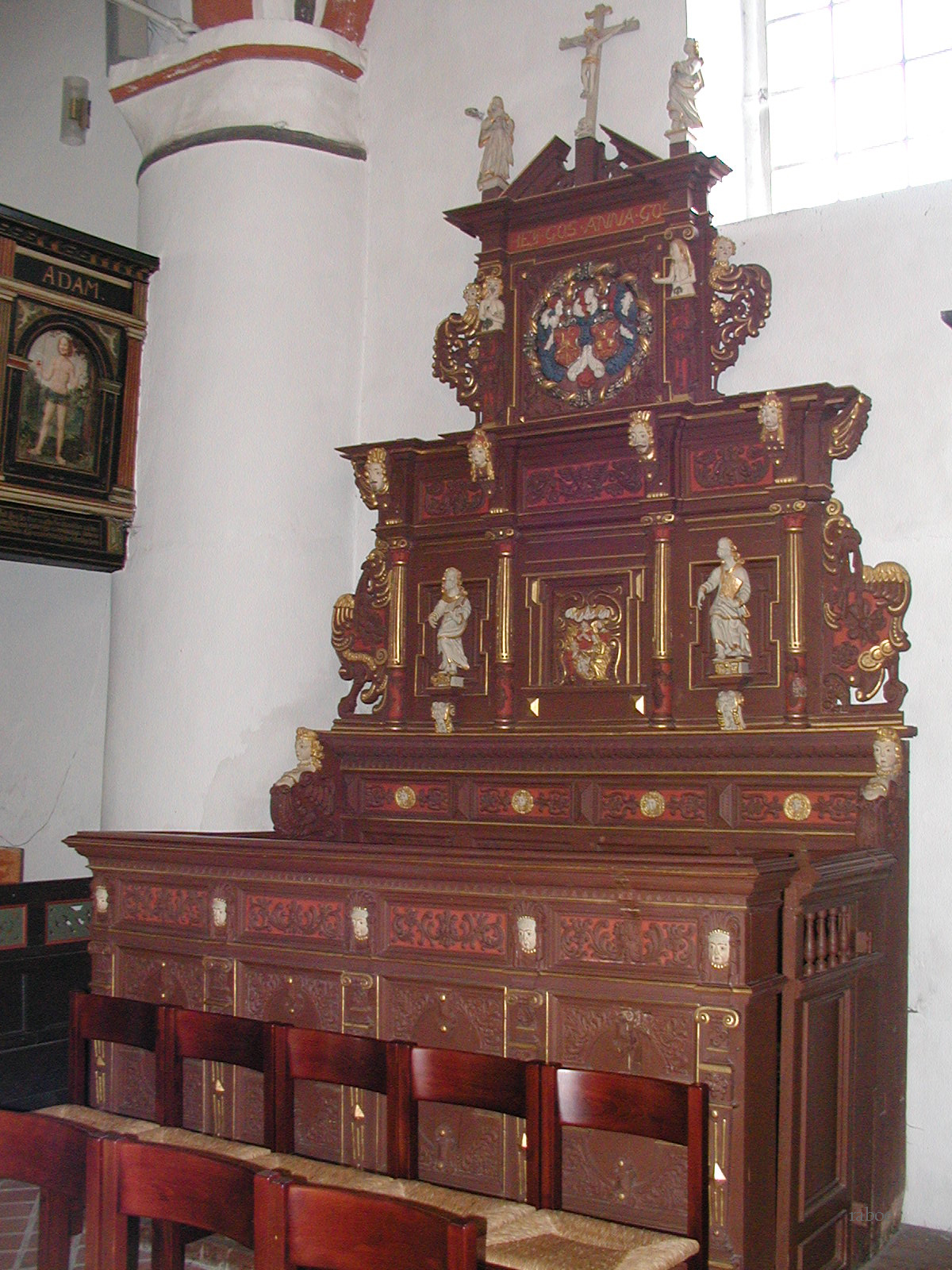
The Sermon Chair

== Personalities ==
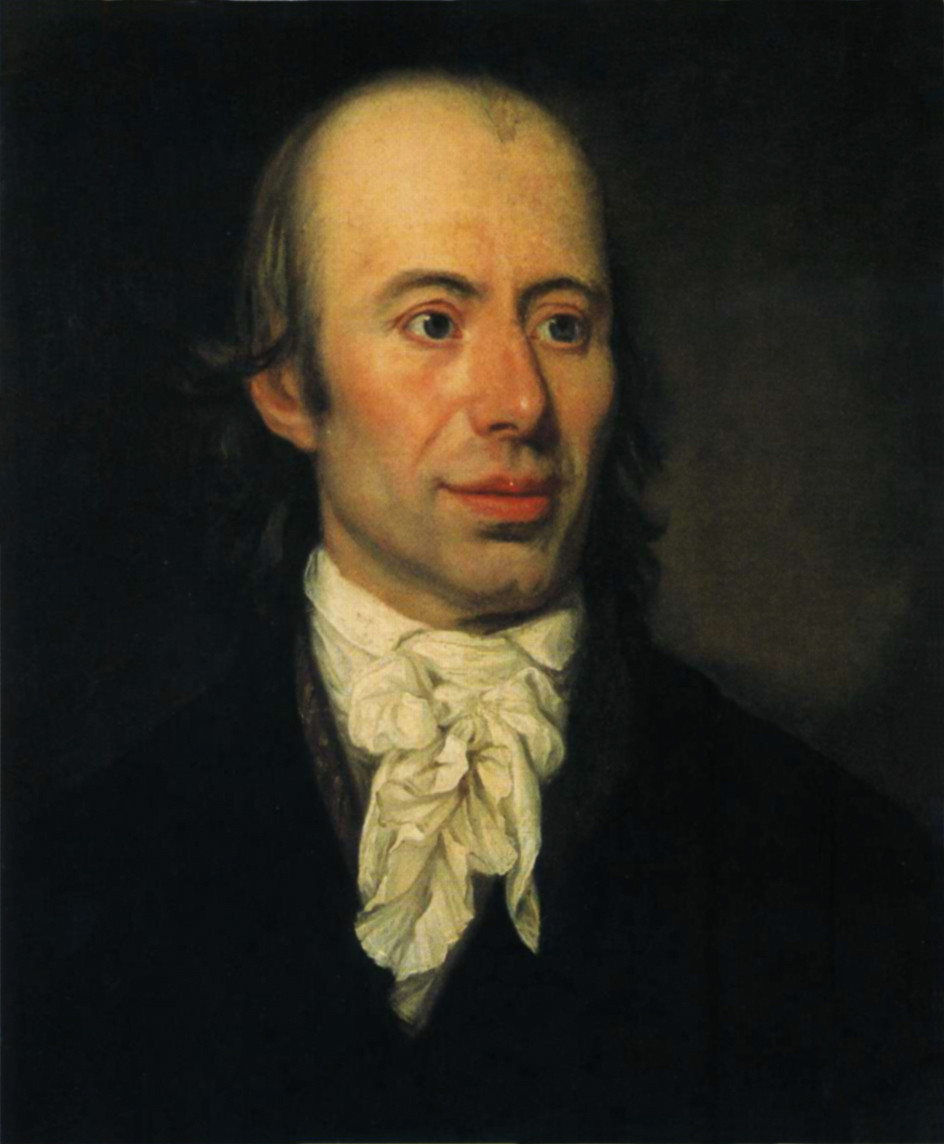
Johann Heinrich Voss in 1797

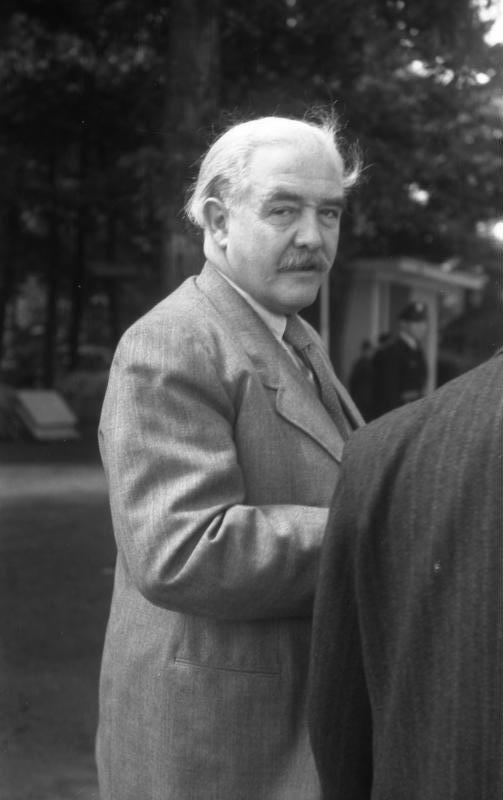
Heinrich Wilhelm Kopf in 1948

=== Sons and daughters of the city ===
- Helmuth Friedrichs (1899-1945), SS leader, member of the Reichstag
- Thorsten Schriever (born 1976), German football judge
- André Hahn (born 1990), German footballer

=== People who are connected to Otterndorf ===
- Johann Heinrich Voss (1751-1826), translator and philologist

=== Honorary citizen ===
- 1950 Hinrich Wilhelm Kopf (1893-1961), German politician (SPD), district administrator of Landkreis Hadeln (1928-1932) and first Minister President of Lower Saxony

== Twin towns ==
- Sheringham, Norfolk, England
