= USS Galena (1880) =

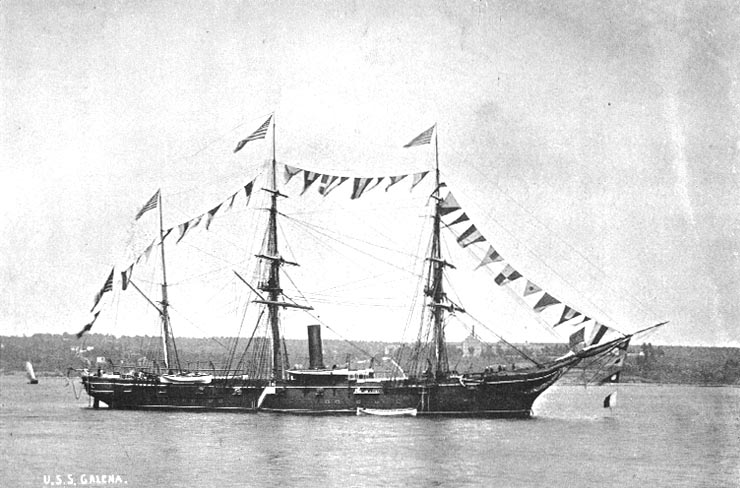
- USS Galena dressed overall in the late 1880s.

History

United States
- Name: USS Galena
- Namesake: Galena, cities in Kansas and Illinois, towns in Maryland and Missouri, and villages in Alaska and Ohio
- Builder: Norfolk Navy Yard, Portsmouth, Virginia
- Launched: 1879
- Commissioned: 26 August 1880
- Decommissioned: 23 July 1890
- Fate: Wrecked 13 March 1891; Stricken 29 February 1892; Sold 2 May 1892

General characteristics
- Displacement: 1,900 tons
- Length: 216 ft (66 m)
- Beam: 37 ft (11 m)
- Draft: 16 ft 6 in (5 m)
- Speed: 9.5 knots (17.6 km/h; 10.9 mph)
- Complement: 214
- Armament: 6 × 9-inch (230 mm) smoothbore guns; 1 × 8-inch (200 mm) rifled gun; 1 × 6-pounder (2.7 kg) breech-loading rifled gun

USS Galena was a wooden armed steamer in commission in the United States Navy from 1880 to 1890. She had an active career in which she operated in the North Atlantic Squadron and South Atlantic Squadron, seeing duty in the Mediterranean Sea and Aegean Sea, along the east coast of South America, in the Caribbean, in the waters of Canada, and along the United States East Coast and United States Gulf Coast.

Galena was named for cities in Kansas and Illinois, towns in Maryland and Missouri, and villages in Alaska and Ohio, all of which in turn were named for galena, a native lead sulfide and the chief ore of lead. She was the second U.S. Navy ship to bear the name.

== Construction and commissioning ==
Galena was constructed at the Norfolk Navy Yard in Portsmouth, Virginia, where she was launched in 1879. She was commissioned there on 26 August 1880.

== Service history ==
=== 1880–1884 ===
Galena departed Hampton Roads, Virginia, on 19 December 1880 and reached Gibraltar on 12 January 1881. She cruised between ports in France, Spain, Portugal, Turkey, and Greece, along the coast of Africa, and to the Canary, Cape Verde, and Madeira Islands. On 7 April 1881 she arrived at Chios in the Aegean Sea and remained until 15 April 1881, helping to relieve the distress caused by a severe earthquake. Her surgeon went ashore to treat the injured; her crew furnished work parties to help clear the rubble; and her steam launch moved relief supplies. Another mission began on 10 June 1882, when she reached Alexandria, Egypt, to embark American citizens and personnel of the American consulate for protection aboard during a rebellion. An Italian ship was chartered as a haven for about 135 refugees until 27 June 1881 when Rear Admiral James W. Nicholson arrived aboard USS Lancaster to relieve Galena.

Galena departed Alexandria on 11 July 1882 for operations along the eastern seaboard of South America, operating from Rio de Janeiro, Brazil. From 19 October 1882 to 31 January 1883 she was the flagship of Rear Admiral Peirce Crosby, commanding the South Atlantic Squadron. She arrived at New York City on 10 September 1883 to serve in the North Atlantic Squadron along the United States East Coast and throughout the Caribbean to the shores of Aspinwall, Colombia (now Colón, Panama). This included station duty at Key West, Florida, from 1 May to 16 August 1884 to prevent illegal filibustering expeditions from the United States to Cuba.

=== 1885–1889 ===
Galena began another special service on 11 March 1885 when she arrived at Aspinwall from New Orleans, Louisiana, during the Panama crisis of 1885, which threatened to interrupt traffic over the Isthmus of Panama. On 30 March 1885, after a party of revolutionists had seized the Pacific Mail Line steamer Colon, Galena regained control of the steamer and returned her to her owners the same day. The next day Galena′s landing force went ashore to save a part of the town of Colon, which had been set afire by the revolutionists. The landing force saved a part of the town and all the property of the Pacific Mail Company. On 10 April 1885, Rear Admiral James Edward Jouett arrived aboard USS Tennessee and with a force of 600 U.S. Navy sailors and United States Marines, assisted by Galena, kept the Isthmus open to crossing travelers and enforced treaty obligations until order was restored in May 1885. (See: Burning of Colón)

Galena departed Colon on 9 June 1885 and reached Portsmouth, New Hampshire, on 26 June 1885 to begin several months of cruising along the U.S. East Coast. Galena returned to Colombian waters on 27 November 1885 for service in the Caribbean. She visited St. Andrew Island, 114 nautical miles (211 km; 131 mi) east of the Nicaraguan coast, on 14 February 1886 to investigate the detention of the American steamer City of Mexico. Finding that the steamer had violated the U.S. Neutrality Act of 1794, Galena seized City of Mexico and sailed her under a prize crew to Key West, where she turned the steamer over to the United States Marshals Service.

Galena returned to New York City on 23 May 1886 to join the North Atlantic Squadron in battle practice along the New England coast. She then sailed to the Newfoundland fishing banks and back. She departed Portsmouth, New Hampshire, on 15 December 1886, to cruise among ports in the West Indies and off Colombia until 18 April 1887.

Galena returned north to the United States in time to participate in ceremonies for the unveiling of the Soldiers and Sailors Monument at New Haven, Connecticut, on 14 June 1887. After a cruise to Canada that took her to Halifax, Nova Scotia, and Quebec City, Montreal, and Habitants Bay, Quebec, Galena arrived at the Philadelphia Navy Yard in Philadelphia, Pennsylvania, on 12 September 1887 to join other ships of the U.S. Navy in celebrating the centennial of the adoption of the Constitution of the United States. Target practice in Gardiner's Bay on the coast of Long Island, New York, was followed by repairs at the Norfolk Navy Yard that lasted until 9 until April 1888. Galena then cruised with the North Atlantic Squadron along the U.S. East Coast and United States Gulf Coast, visiting New Orleans; Mobile, Alabama; and Port Royal, South Carolina. From 18 August 18 to 15 September 1888, she watched over political disturbances at Port-au-Prince, Haiti, then proceeded to New York City.

Galena departed New York City on 12 December 1888 as flagship of Rear Admiral Stephen B. Luce, Commander-in-Chief, North Atlantic Squadron, and reached Port-au-Prince on 20 December 1888. There, Haitian authorities surrendered the American steamer Haytien Republic, which they had seized for alleged violation of a blockade, to Admiral Luce's force.

=== 1889–1890 ===
Galena arrived at Key West in January 1889, where on 16 February 1889 Rear Admiral Bancroft Gherardi relieved Luce as Commander-in-Chief, North Atlantic Squadron, and with Galena as his flagship. She sailed the following day for Haitian waters and then returned to New York City on 29 May 1889. Admiral Gherardi transferred his flag to USS Kearsarge on 15 June 1889.

After repairs at New York, Galena arrived at Cap-Haïtien, Haiti, on 6 September 1889 and relieved Kearsarge as flagship. At the island of Navassa on 6 October 1889, she took on board nine ringleaders of a riot, then proceeded to Baltimore, Maryland, where she turned them over to the custody of the United States Marshal on 25 October 1889. She underwent repairs at the New York Navy Yard in Brooklyn, New York, then sailed on 3 December 1889 to serve once more as Admiral Gherardi's flagship, based at Key West, a made a series of cruises to the waters of Haiti. USS Dolphin relieved her as flagship while she was at Môle-Saint-Nicolas, Haiti, on 14 February 1890, and she departed Key West on 25 May 1890 and made calls at Port Royal and at Charleston, South Carolina, before arriving at the New York Navy Yard on 1 July 1890. She was decommissioned there on 23 July 1890.

== Final disposition ==
Galena remained at the New York Navy Yard until 12 March 1891, when the tug USS Nina took her under tow, headed for the Portsmouth Navy Yard in Kittery, Maine, where Galena was to be fitted with new boilers. On 13 March 1891, however, both ships ran aground in fog on a beach about 1 mile (1.6 km) south of Gay Head on Martha's Vineyard off the coast of Massachusetts.

Salvaged under a contract to the Boston Tow Boat Company, Galena arrived at the Portsmouth Navy Yard on 6 April 1891. Repairs were deemed too costly. Galena was stricken from the Naval Vessel Register on 29 February 1892, and she was sold to E. J. Butler of Arlington, Massachusetts, on 9 May 1892.

== See also ==
- USS Nina (1865)
- USS Triana (1865)
