= USS Nina =

United States Navy steamer

History

United States
- Name: USS Nina
- Namesake: Christopher Columbus's ship Niña
- Builder: Reaney, Son & Archbold, Chester, Pennsylvania
- Yard number: 38
- Laid down: 1864
- Launched: 27 May 1865
- Acquired: 26 September 1865
- Commissioned: 6 January 1866
- Decommissioned: ca. May 1869
- Recommissioned: 31 March 1870
- Decommissioned: ca. 1902
- Recommissioned: 8 October 1902
- Decommissioned: 21 March 1903
- In service: 21 March 1903–9 September 1905 (non-commissioned)
- Recommissioned: 9 September 1905
- Stricken: 15 March 1910
- Fate: Missing after 6 February 1910; Wreck discovered 1978

General characteristics
- Class & type: Palos-class tug
- Type: Screw steamer
- Displacement: 420 tons
- Length: 137 ft (42 m)
- Beam: 26 ft (7.9 m)
- Draft: 9 ft 10 in (3 m)
- Speed: 10.35 knots (19.17 km/h; 11.91 mph)

USS Nina was a United States Navy steamer commissioned in 1866. She served in a variety of roles—as a tug, torpedo boat, torpedo boat tender, salvage ship, supply ship, and submarine tender—before she sank in a storm in 1910.

== Construction and commissioning ==
Nina, a fourth-rate iron-hulled screw steamer, was laid down by Reaney, Son & Archbold, at Chester, Pennsylvania, in 1864. Launched on 27 May 1865, she was delivered at the New York Navy Yard in Brooklyn, New York on 26 September 1865. She was placed in service as a yard tug at the Washington Navy Yard in Washington, D.C., on 6 January 1866 with Ensign F. C. Hall commanding her and the tugs USS Primrose and USS Rescue.

== Service history ==
=== Tug and torpedo boat ===
Nina operated as a yard tug at the Washington Navy Yard and Naval Gun Factory in Washington, D.C., through May 1869 and then was converted into a torpedo boat. She was recommissioned as a torpedo boat on 31 March 1870 and then departed for Newport, Rhode Island, where she arrived at Naval Station Newport on 14 April 1870. She served as a torpedo boat at Newport through 1883.

=== Salvage vessel and tugboat ===
Nina was refitted in May 1884 for special service, and next operated from August to October 1884 salvaging the wreck of sidewheel gunboat USS Tallapoosa, which had sunk in Vineyard Sound off the coast of Massachusetts. From 1885 to 1889, Nina served in various capacities at the New York Navy Yard, and then operated at Newport again from 1890 to 1891.

On 12 March 1891, Nina departed the New York Navy Yard with the decommissioned armed steamer USS Galena in tow, headed for the Portsmouth Navy Yard in Kittery, Maine, where Galena was to be fitted with new boilers. On 13 March 1891, however, both ships ran aground in fog on a beach about 1 mile (1.6 km) south of Gay Head on Martha's Vineyard off the coast of Massachusetts. Both vessels were refloated a few days later. Galena was deemed beyond economical repair, but Nina was repaired and returned to service.

Nina was reassigned to the New York Navy Yard in 1892 to resume her original duties, continuing her yard work and towing services there for a decade.

=== Tender and supply ship ===
On 8 October 1902, Nina was recommissioned as a torpedo boat tender and supply ship for the Torpedo Boat Flotilla during winter maneuvers in the Caribbean. She returned to the New York Navy Yard on 15 March 1903 and was decommissioned on 21 March 1903, once again taking up her yard towing chores. Nina was next loaned to the Lighthouse Department to verify aids to navigation near Puerto Rican waters to protect the fleet while it conducted winter maneuvers from October 1903 to April 1904. She was recommissioned on 9 September 1905 for special service with the Board of Inspection and Survey at Rockland, Maine.

=== Submarine tender ===
Nina was ordered converted into a submarine tender on 28 December 1905. On 25 May 1906, she arrived at the Naval Torpedo Station at Newport, and, following a year’s service, was assigned as torpedo boat tender for the 1st Torpedo Flotilla. For the next four years, she served with the United States Atlantic Fleet’s infant submarine force in its pioneering coastal operations along the United States East Coast from Newport to Annapolis, Maryland, and Norfolk, Virginia. From 1 December 1908 to 22 February 1909, she participated in the great naval review in Hampton Roads, Virginia, following the return of the Great White Fleet from its around-the-world cruise and joined submarines in exercises off the coast of Virginia.

=== Loss ===
At 0630 on 6 February 1910, Nina departed Norfolk bound for Boston, Massachusetts. and was last sighted off the Capes of the Chesapeake in the midst of a gale. She was never heard from again. She was declared lost and struck from the Navy List 15 March 1910, the 30 crewmen and one officer on board listed as having died on that day.

== Wreck ==
In 1978, divers discovered Nina′s wreck in the Atlantic Ocean 11 nautical miles (20 km; 13 mi) northeast of Ocean City, Maryland, in 90 feet (27 m) of water.

== See also ==
- USS Galena (1880)
- USS Triana (1865)
