= SS Kaffraria =

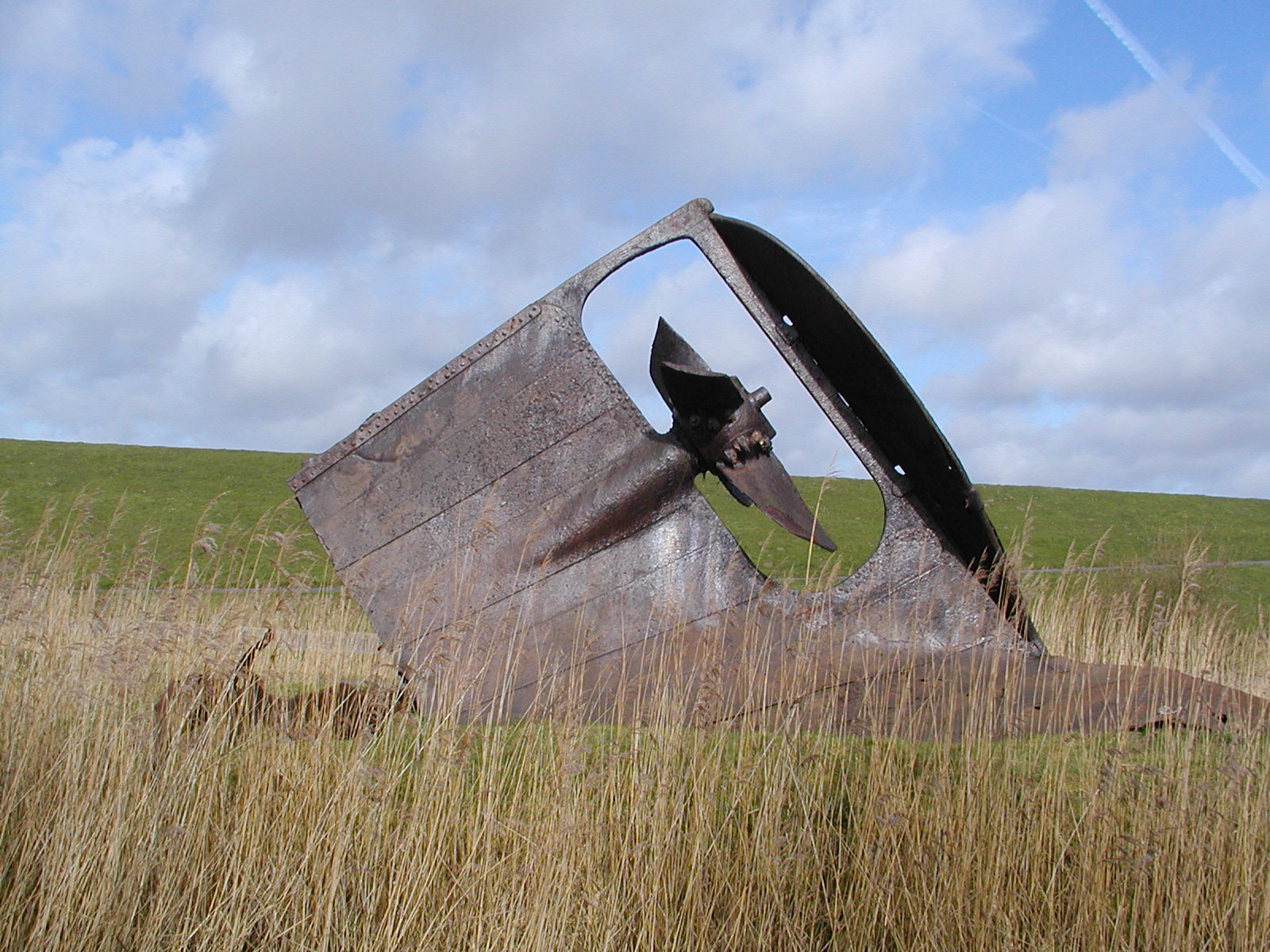
- The remains of the SS Kaffraria at Otterndorf, Germany

History

United Kingdom
- Name: SS Kaffraria
- Namesake: Kaffraria, the name given to the southeast part of the Eastern Cape of South Africa
- Owner: W.S. Bailey
- Ordered: 1862
- Builder: J Laing Ltd, Sunderland
- Launched: 21 April 1864
- Maiden voyage: 1864
- Home port: Hull, England
- Identification: Official number 49917; Code letters WFVQ
- Fate: Wrecked 7 January 1892

General characteristics
- Tonnage: 872 GRT (increased to 1,039 tons in 1871); 803 tons under deck; 675 NRT
- Length: 237 ft (72 m)
- Beam: 29 ft (8.8 m)
- Depth: 16 ft (4.9 m)
- Propulsion: Compound engines with 4 cylinders of 21 and 38 in (53 and 97 cm) diameter each pair; Built by Humber Iron Works; Single screw
- Speed: 8–10 knots (15–19 km/h; 9.2–11.5 mph)

SS Kaffraria was a British cargo ship owned by Bailey & Leetham of Hull, England. She was built in 1864 by J. Laing & Son, Ltd., of Sunderland, England. She was originally built for the shipping company Ryrie & Company of London, which sold her to Bailey & Leetham in 1871.

== Construction ==
Initially the ship was rated at 872 gross register tons, but this was increased in 1873 to 1,039 gross register tons. She was 237 feet (72 m) long and had a beam of 29 feet (8.8 m) with a depth of 16 feet (4.9 m). She was a single-screw schooner constructed of iron, with one deck with two tiers of beams, five cemented bulkheads, a well deck, and a double bottom aft. She had a four-cylinder compound engine which produced 90 horsepower (67 kW). The engine was built by the Humber Iron Works of Hull, England. Her Lloyd's Register code letters were WFVQ and her official number was 49917.

== Wreck ==
While under the command of Captain W. Barron, Kaffraria ran aground in the River Elbe at Otterndorf, Germany, on 7 January 1891. The ship had a cargo of general export goods such as kitchen utensils, children's toys, bundles of wool, hand tools, and all kinds of domestic appliances. Local residents quickly removed the cargo both legally and illegally. Later on 8 January, the ship sank. The wreck became a threat to shipping and was removed in 1984. The stern part of the ship with the rudder and screw can be seen today at Otterndorf.
