= USS Triana (1865) =

Tugboat of the United States Navy

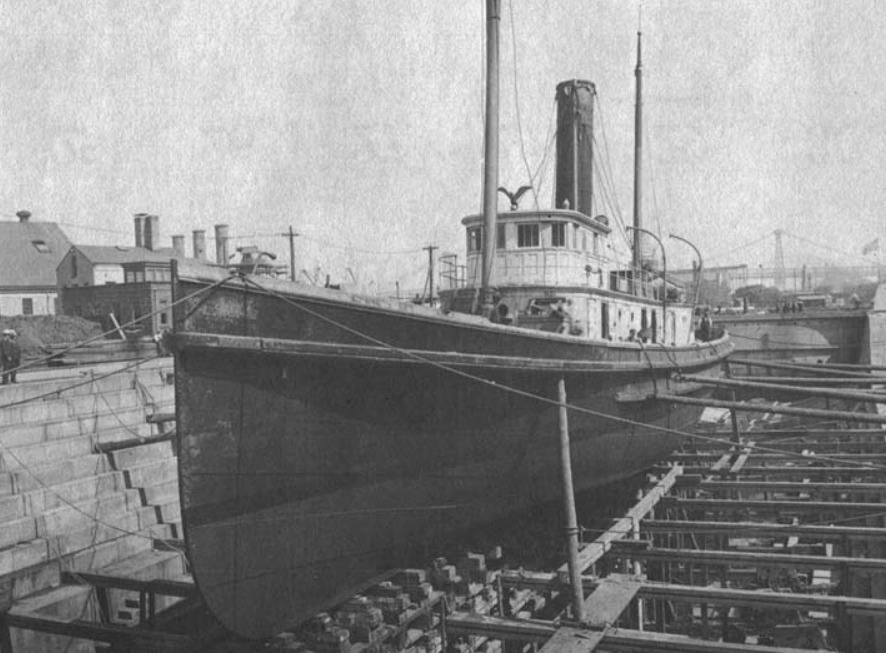
- USS Triana (1865)

History

United States
- Name: USS Triana
- Namesake: Probably Rodrigo de Triana
- Builder: William Perrine, New York, New York
- Launched: 1865
- Completed: After January 1866
- Commissioned: By summer 1867
- Fate: Wrecked 15 March 1891; Struck 13 April 1891; Sold 2 May 1891

General characteristics
- Type: Tug
- Displacement: 450 tons
- Length: 137 ft (42 m) between perpendiculars
- Beam: 26 ft (7.9 m)
- Draft: 9 ft 6 in (2.9 m) (mean)
- Speed: 10 knots (19 km/h; 12 mph)

The first USS Triana was a screw steamer in commission as a tug in the United States Navy from at least 1867 until she was wrecked in 1891.

The first U.S. Navy ship of the name, she probably was named for Rodrigo de Triana, the lookout aboard Pinta, who first sighted land on 12 October 1492 during Christopher Columbus′s first voyage to the New World, although no documentary evidence has been found linking her name to Triana.

== Construction ==
Triana was constructed by William Perrine at New York City and launched in 1865. She apparently was completed sometime after January 1866.

== Service history ==
After her delivery to the U.S. Navy, Triana was laid up at the Washington Navy Yard in Washington, D.C. Either during or before the summer of 1867, she began active service at the Washington Navy Yard. In 1880, she was transferred to the New York Navy Yard in Brooklyn, New York, where she operated until 1887. She then was transferred again, this time to the Naval Torpedo Station at Newport, Rhode Island, where she performed "special service" duty in support of U.S. Navy experimental torpedo work and served as an accommodation ship for U.S. Navy personnel under instruction at Naval Station Newport.

On 13 March 1891, two U.S. Navy steamers — USS Galena and USS Nina, which was towing Galena — ran aground in fog on Devil's Bridge, a reef off Martha's Vineyard, Massachusetts. Ordered to proceed to the scene and assist in salvaging the two ships, Triana was wrecked on 15 March 1891 off the coast of Massachusetts on a sandbar off the east end of Cuttyhunk Island because of a navigational error by her crew. She sank in up to 20 feet (6.1 m) of water just west of Canapitsit Channel at 41°25′15″N 070°55′02″W.

Triana was struck from the Navy list on 13 April 1891. Her wreck was sold on 2 May 1891.

== See also ==
- USS Galena (1880)
- USS Nina (1865)
