= Bederkesa (Samtgemeinde) =

- Samtgemeinde
- Coat of arms

- Location of Bederkesa within Cuxhaven district
- Interactive map of Bederkesa
- Location within Germany Location within Lower Saxony
- Coordinates: 53°37′30″N 08°50′29″E
- Country: Germany
- State: Lower Saxony
- District: Cuxhaven
- Founded: 1971
- Disbanded: January 2015
- Subdivisions: 8 municipalities

Area
  - Total: 234.60 km^{2} (90.58 sq mi)
- Elevation: 9 m (30 ft)

Population (2013-12-31)
  - Total: 12,081
  - Density: 51.496/km^{2} (133.37/sq mi)
- Time zone: UTC+01:00 (CET)
  - Summer (DST): UTC+02:00 (CEST)
- Postal codes: 27624
- Dialling codes: 04745
- Vehicle registration: CUX
- Website: bad-bederkesa.de

Bederkesa is a former Samtgemeinde ("collective municipality") in the district of Cuxhaven, in Lower Saxony, Germany. Its seat was in the village Bad Bederkesa. It was disbanded in January 2015, when its member municipalities merged into the new municipality Geestland.

The Samtgemeinde Bederkesa consisted of the following municipalities:

- Bad Bederkesa
- Drangstedt
- Elmlohe
- Flögeln
- Köhlen
- Kührstedt
- Lintig
- Ringstedt
