= Elmlohe =

- Ortsteil of Geestland
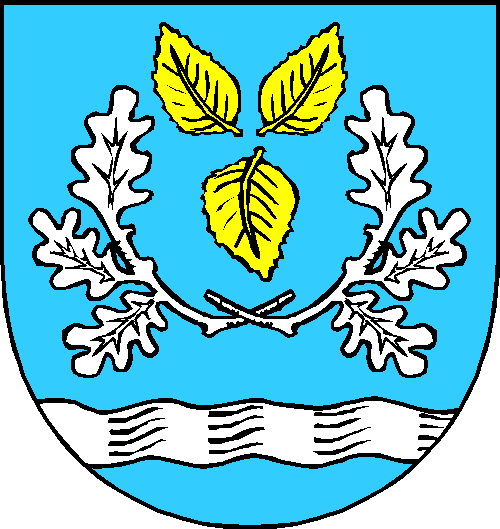
- Coat of arms
- Interactive map of Elmlohe
- Location within Germany Location within Lower Saxony
- Coordinates: 53°35′08″N 08°44′31″E
- Country: Germany
- State: Lower Saxony
- District: Cuxhaven
- Town: Geestland

Area
  - Total: 23.3 km^{2} (9.0 sq mi)
- Elevation: 7 m (23 ft)

Population (2013-12-31)
  - Total: 813
  - Density: 34.9/km^{2} (90.4/sq mi)
- Time zone: UTC+01:00 (CET)
  - Summer (DST): UTC+02:00 (CEST)
- Postal codes: 27624
- Dialling codes: 04704
- Vehicle registration: CUX
- Website: geestland.eu

Elmlohe (German pronunciation: [ˈɛlmloːə]; Low German: Elm) is a village and a former municipality in the district of Cuxhaven, in Lower Saxony, Germany. Since 1 January 2015 it is part of the town Geestland. It was a component municipality of the former Samtgemeinde Bederkesa.

== Toponymy and Coat of Arms ==
Elmlohe derives from the homonymous elm tree and lohe, which corresponds to the Old English lea, in place names written leigh in today's spelling, or to Dutch loo (in Dutch), and signifies a glade or wood of glades. Elmlohe uses a canting coat of arms, showing three elm leaves on a blue ground.

== History ==
Elmlohe emerged at the beginning of the 14th century, when the Bailiffs of Bederkesa erected a castle at the Quabben-Bach beck, a tributary of the Geeste (river). A co-founder of the castle, Werner von Bederkesa, is mentioned in a deed of 1308, issued by the Neuenwalde Nunnery. On the Free Dam, a seigniorial immunity, leading to the castle, the esquires of Elmlohe settled handcrafters and peasants subject to their patronage. The Esquires von Elme and von der Lieth prompted the construction of a church in 1346, consecrated to Saint Mary of Nazareth. The church was originally affiliated to the church in Debstedt (a part of today's Langen bei Bremerhaven) but soon became a parish of its own, due to conflicts between the Frisians there and the Saxons in Elmlohe.

Elmlohe then belonged to the Prince-Archbishopric of Bremen (est. as principality of imperial immediacy in 1180). In 1380 – under the reign of Prince-Archbishop Albert II – knights of the family von Mandelsloh and other Verdian and Bremian robber barons ravaged burghers of Bremen and people in the entire Prince-Archbishopric. In 1381 the city's troops successfully ended the brigandage and captured the castle of Bederkesa and the pertaining bailiwick, including Elmlohe. In 1386 the city of Bremen made the noble family von der Lieth, holding the estates of Elmlohe, its vassal. Because of a felony against the city of Bremen, being his liege, the city sent troops which beleaguered Cord von der Lieth in his castle of Elmlohe and finally destroyed it in 1485. However, the family von der Lieth was allowed to keep the seigniory over the local peasants as vassal of the city.

In 1648 the Prince-Archbishopric was transformed into the Duchy of Bremen, which was first ruled in personal union by the Swedish Crown. In November 1654, after the Second Bremian War, Bremen had to cede Bederkesa and Lehe (a part of today's Bremerhaven) to the Duchy of Bremen. After the Danish occupation (1712–1715) the Duchy of Bremen became a fief to the House of Hanover. In the 18th century the seigniory was abolished in favour of freehold land property, thus the family von der Lieth and the peasants turned into independent farmers.

In 1807 the ephemeric Kingdom of Westphalia annexed the Duchy, before France annexed it in 1810. In 1813 the Duchy was restored to the Electorate of Hanover, which – after its upgrade to the Kingdom of Hanover in 1814 – incorporated the Duchy in a real union and the Ducal territory, including Elmlohe, became part of the new Stade Region, established in 1823. On the occasion of the 700th anniversary of Elmlohe's foundation the municipality published a book on its history: "Elmlohe – ein Dorf im Wandel des Zeit 1308–2008".

== Attractions of Elmlohe ==
Elmlohe is famous throughout Europe for its horse competition taking place at the end of July every year.
