= Elbe–Weser waterway =

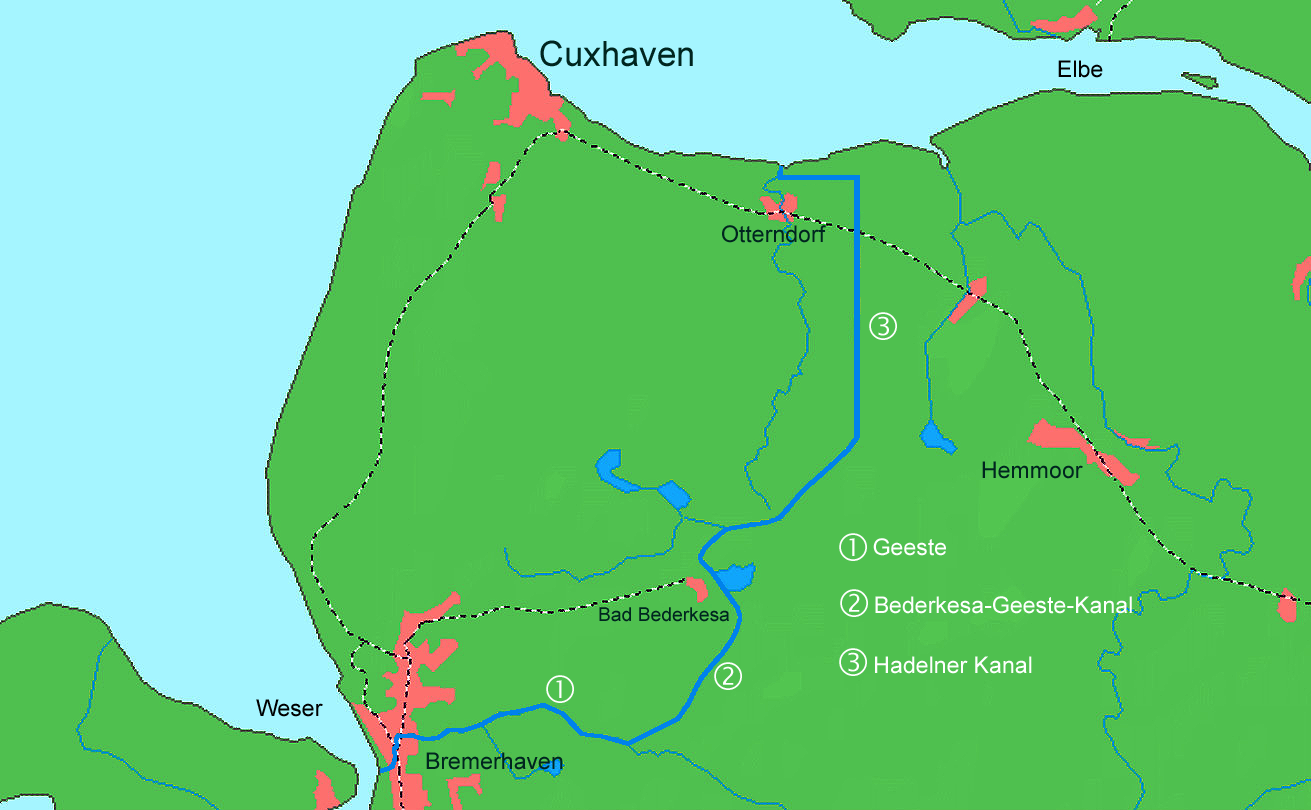
The Elbe–Weser waterway

The Elbe–Weser waterway (German: Elbe-Weser-Schifffahrtsweg) or Elbe–Weser shipping channel is a short-cut between the rivers Elbe and Weser in North Germany which is part-canal and part-river. It has a length of 54.7 kilometres (34.0 mi) and is designed for smaller coastal vessels. It includes some 60 kilometres (37 mi) of canal dykes and 45 kilometres (28 mi) of canal paths. The channel starts in Otterndorf with the Hadeln Canal, then becomes the Bederkesa-Geeste Canal from the town of Bad Bederkesa to the River Geeste, the final leg of the shipping channel, which flows into the Weser at Bremerhaven. It is owned by the state of Lower Saxony, maintained by the NLWKN from its Stade office. Today they just look after maintenance of the drainage system, because the economic element of the canal – commercial shipping which was particularly thriving in the late 1960s – declined increasingly from 1973 onwards and today hardly exists at all. Nevertheless, the waterway is still used by smaller yachts as a short cut between Elbe and Weser.

== History ==
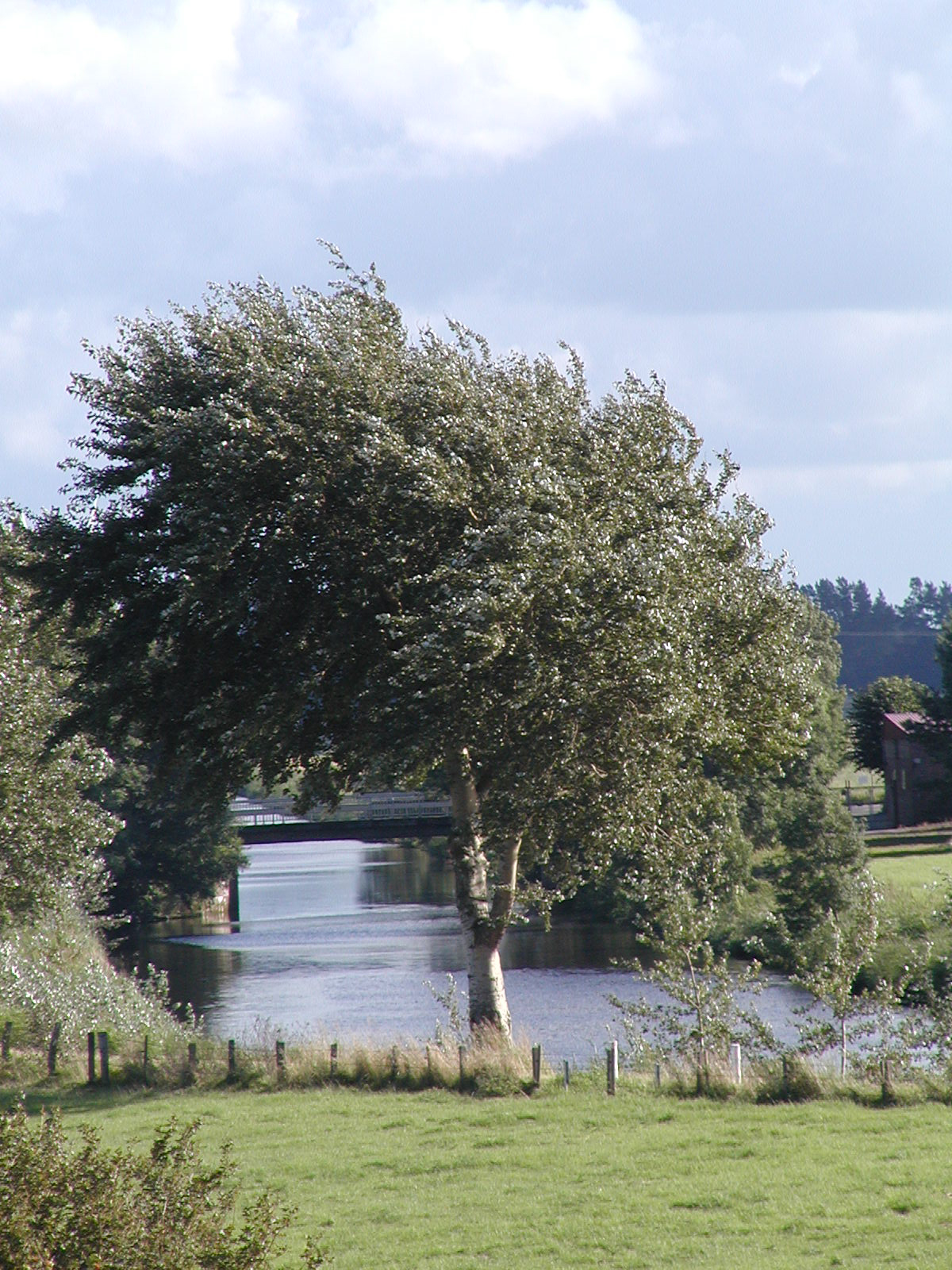
The Hadeln Canal near Otterndorf

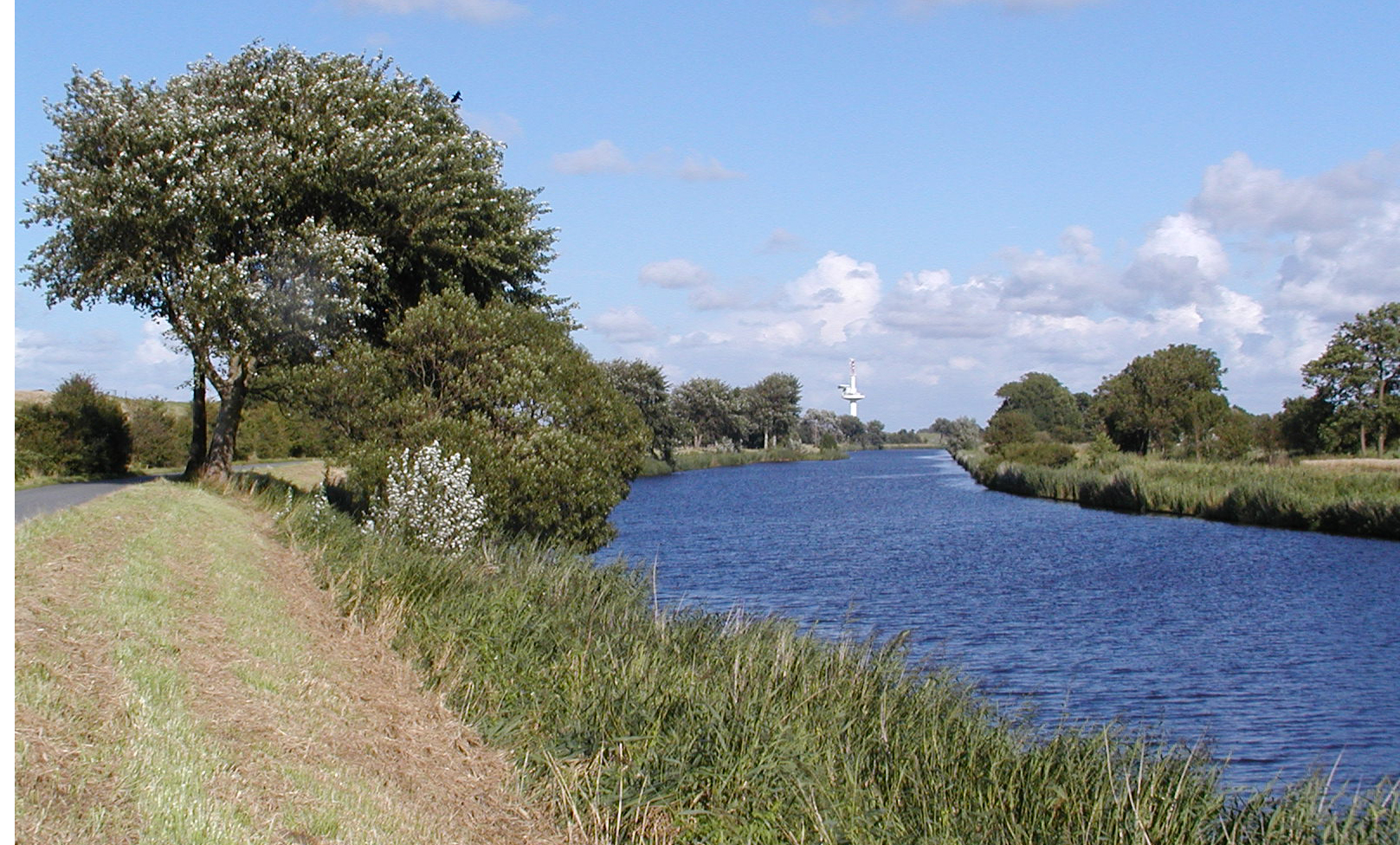
The Hadeln Canal near Otterndorf

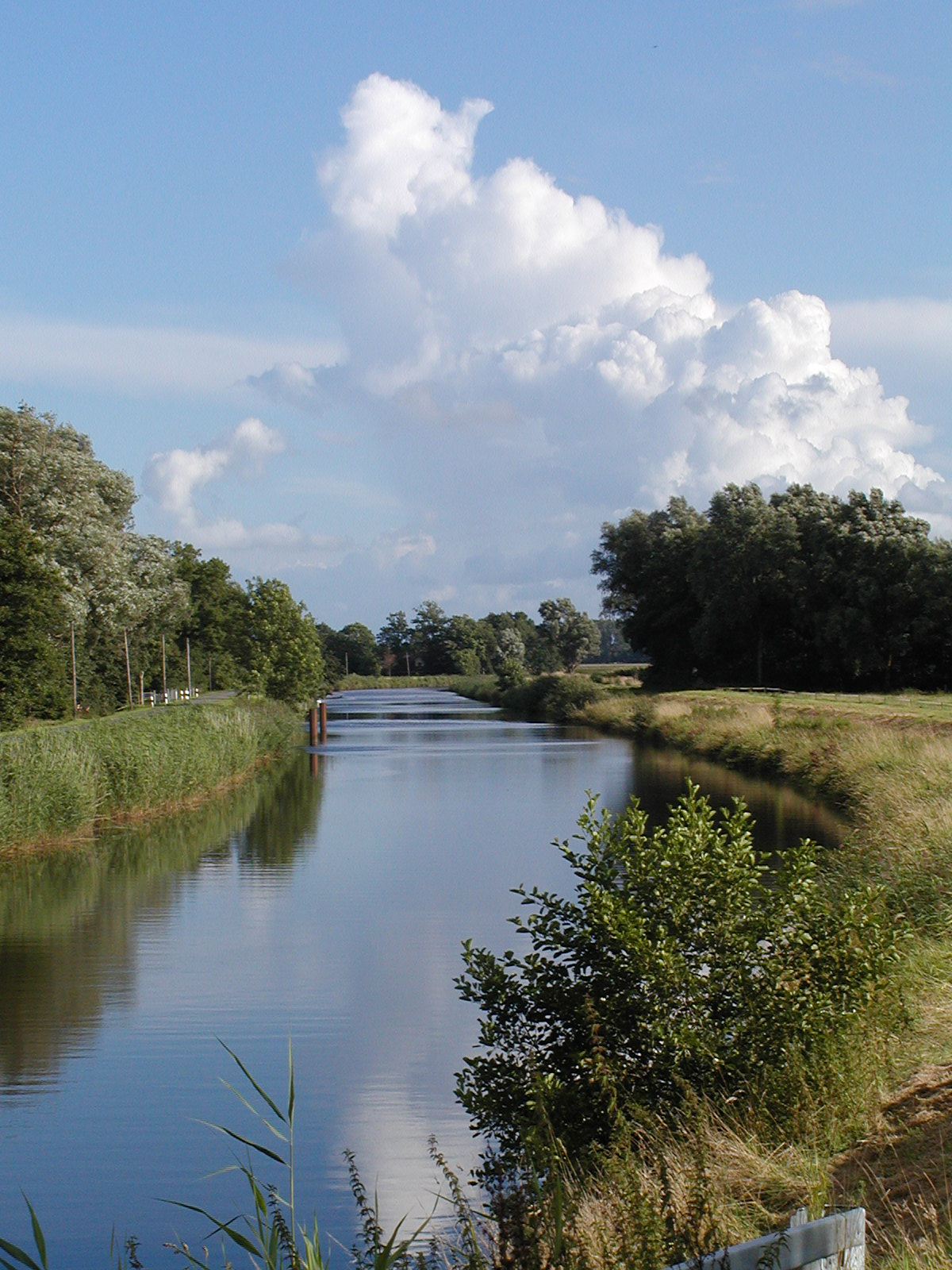
The Hadeln Canal in Bülkau

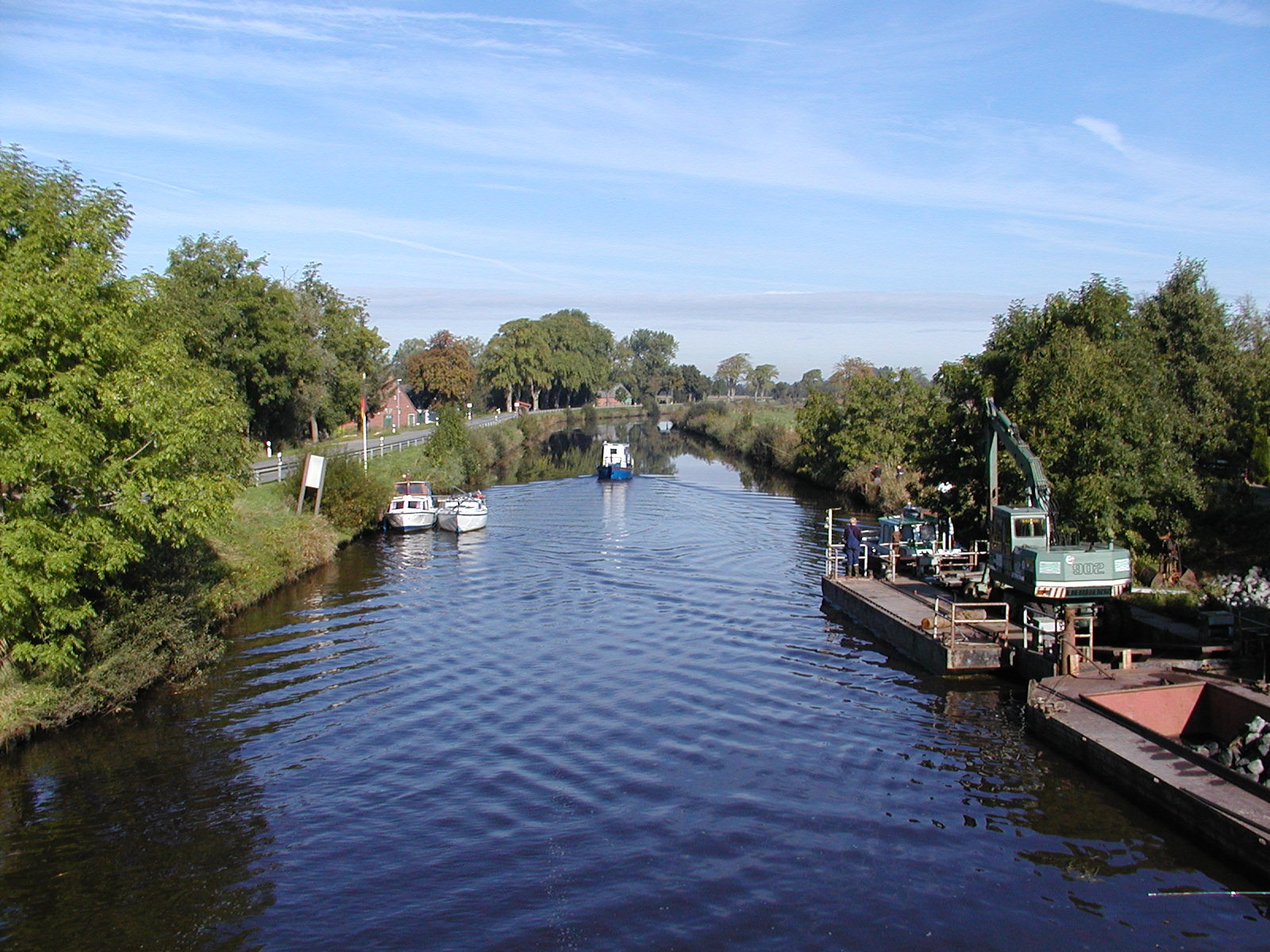
The Hadlerkanal im Odisheim Richtung Nord

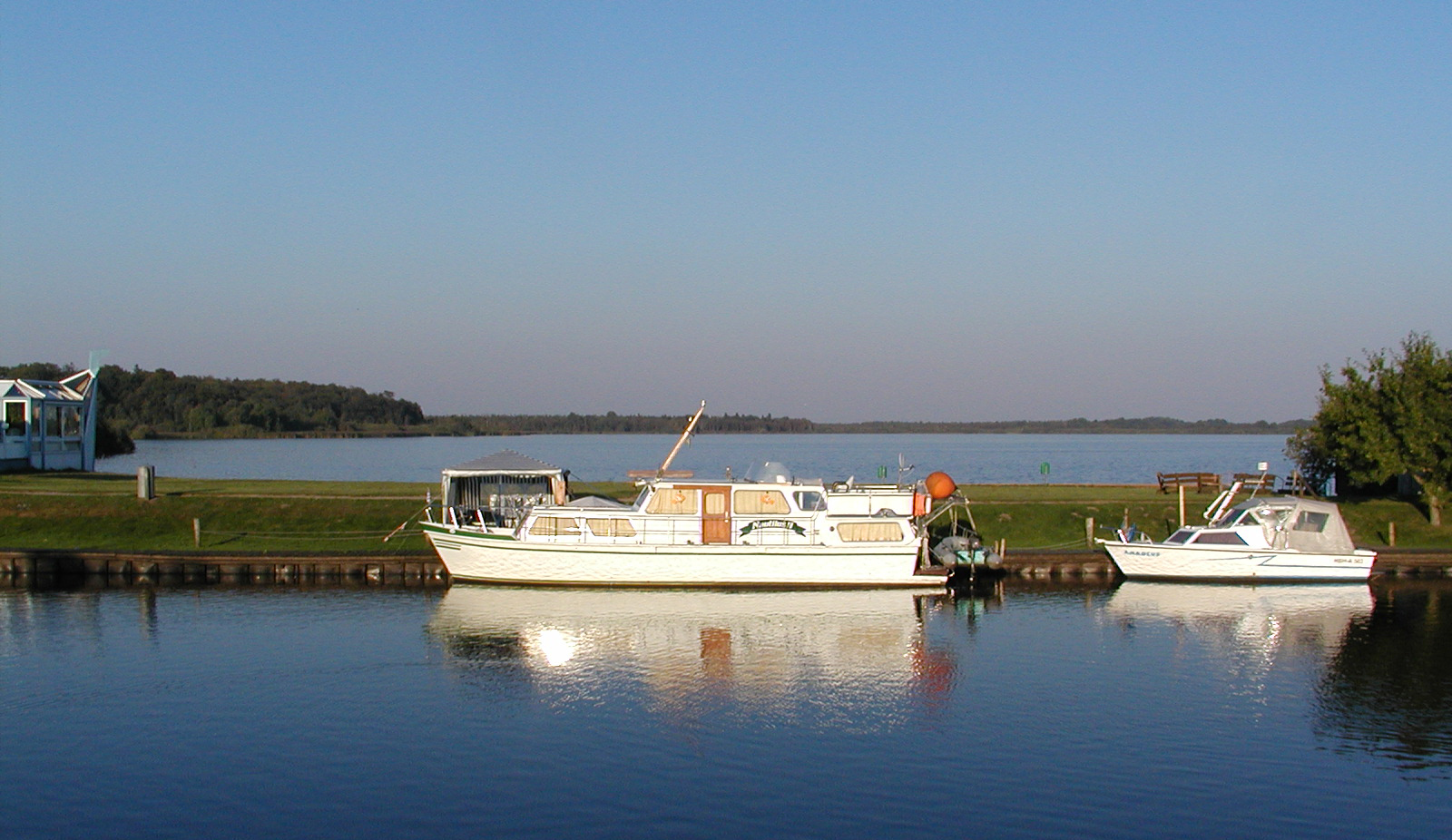
Bederkesa Lake and Hadeln Canal

Very early on, rulers in the Elbe–Weser triangle wanted to build a link between the Elbe and the Weser, because ships had to follow a long detour around Cuxhaven, Neuwerk and Scharhörn. This circuitous route was necessary because the Wadden Sea, with its shoals in the area between the Weser and Elbe estuaries, was unnavigable. In addition, in stormy seas small boats did not dare to make the passage. The first records of the subject between the Duchy of Saxe-Lauenburg, the Archdiocese of Bremen and the Hadlers date to the year 1542. As early as 1608/09 a section had been excavated, albeit filled in again by order of the Archbishop of Bremen. Other attempts were made in 1661 and 1768 to 1773. Under French rule another plan was drawn up between 1806 and 1811, but did not come to fruition. This plan had the aim of also creating a link between the Oste and the Geeste.

== Hadeln Canal ==
The waterway was finally opened following the construction of the Hadeln Canal (also called the Hadeler or Hadler Canal), a navigable, drainage channel, roughly 32 kilometres (20 mi) long, between the Elbe near Otterndorf and the lake near Bad Bederkesa. The Hadeln Canal was built between 1852 and 1855 and, in addition to providing drainage, acted as a short cut between the Weser and the Elbe until the 1990s, especially for small coastal motor vessels and sports boats.

The canal is designed for boats with a length of up to 33.50 metres and a beam of up to 5.00 metres. A draft of up to 1.50 metres is possible. The maximum permitted height, determined by the many bridges, is 2.70 metres. These official figures are only of a theoretical nature, because the canal is no longer managed and reports of boats exceeding these limits are on the rise.

== Bederkesa–Geeste canal ==
The Bederkesa–Geeste canal was built in the years 1858–1860, because the Hadeln Canal proved economically viable and a link to Bremerhaven was seen as necessary. These 11 kilometres (6.8 mi) were only navigable until the construction of the lock in the Geeste in 1898, thereafter the water level through the lock was too low. Not until the channel was deepened in 1935-37 were barges once again able to use it. A further excavation to cater for larger coastal vessels (Kümos) took place in 1957–1961.

== The Geeste ==
The Geeste river rises in Hipstedt in the district of Rotenburg ten kilometres west of Bremervörde and drains a large part of the old district of Wesermünde (now Cuxhaven).

The construction of the third lock on the Geeste in 1898 made the river independent of tides but also resulted in the depth of the channel becoming too low. So until 1935 its use for shipping was limited. Further building work, from 1957 to 1961 and the construction of a tide and storm surge barrier at Bremerhaven improved its shipping capacity significantly.

== Locks ==
The Hadeln Canal has a lock at Otterndorf. Locking is routinely available during the summer months, but in winter only on request. Actual hours of operation are depending on the tides of the Lower Elbe.

The second lock is near Lintig on the Bederkesa–Geeste canal; this can be operated by boat crews themselves all year round.

The lock in Bremerhaven (Tidesperrwerk Bremerhaven) operates daily, but actual hours of operation are depending on the tides.

The Schiffdorf flash lock (Schiffdorfer Stauschleuse) on the Geeste at the eastern edge of Bremerhaven was the tidal barrage up to the construction of the lock in Bremerhaven. The flash lock operated between 1892 and the 1960s. Since 1985 the remains of the flash lock are protected as a cultural monument.

Shortly before the confluence of the Geeste is the storm surge barrier under the Kennedy Bridge which was completed in 1961.
