= Elbe Canal =

Elbe Canal may refer to:

- Elbe–Havel Canal, between the Elbe and the Havel
- Elbe Lateral Canal, between the Elbe and the Mittelland Canal
- Elbe–Lübeck Canal, between the Elbe and the Trave
- Elbe-Weser Waterway, between the Elbe and the Weser
