= Brigitte Adler =

German politician (1944–2004)

Member of the Bundestag
- In office 18 February 1987 – 17 October 2002

Personal details
- Born: 22 April 1944 Drangstedt, Germany
- Died: 25 October 2004 (aged 60) Würzburg, Bavaria, Germany
- Party: Social Democratic

Brigitte Adler (22 April 1944 – 25 October 2004) was a German politician of the Social Democratic Party (SPD) and former member of the German Bundestag.

== Early life ==
Adler was born on 22 April 1944 in Drangstedt, Wesermünde. She attended Wertheim High School, where she completed her intermediary examination. She attended the Heidelberg teacher training college and the Weingarten/Tettnang Primary Teacher's Institute, where she completed Parts I and II of her teacher training examinations.

== Career ==
She had been a member of the Social Democratic Party (SPD) since 1970. She moved to the German Bundestag in the 1987 federal elections on the Baden-Württemberg state list. She did the same in the 1990 and 1994 parliamentary elections and was a member and secretary of the Committee on Economic Cooperation and Development in the 1994–1998 term.

== Literature ==
Herbst, Ludolf; Jahn, Bruno (2002). Vierhaus, Rudolf (ed.). Biographisches Handbuch der Mitglieder des Deutschen Bundestages. 1949–2002 [Biographical Handbook of the Members of the German Bundestag. 1949–2002] (in German). München: De Gruyter - De Gruyter Saur. p. 1715. ISBN 978-3-11-184511-1.
