= Geeste (river) =

River in Germany

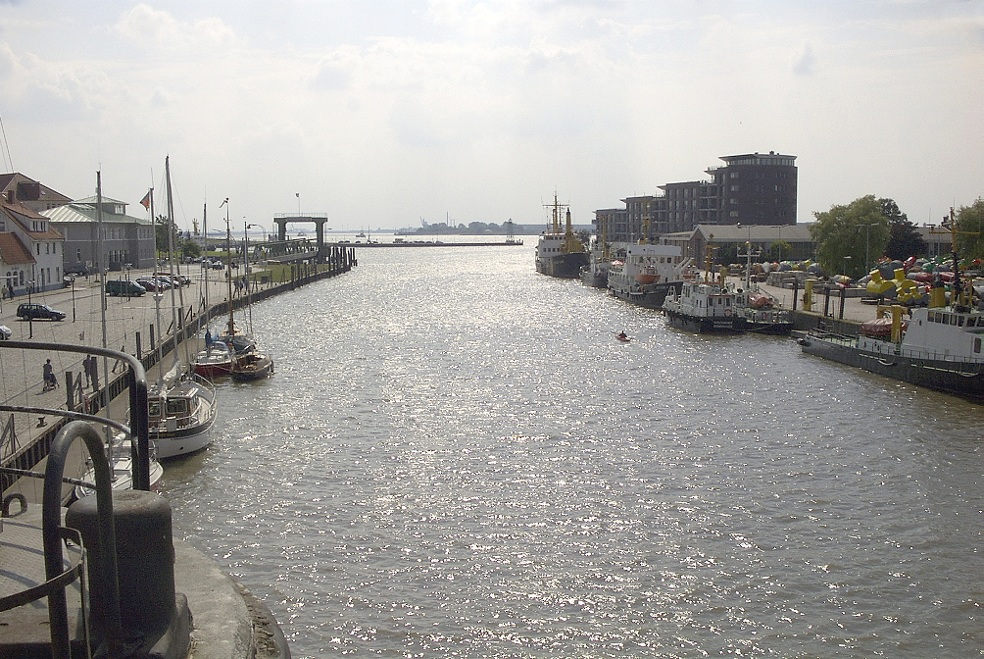
- The mouth of the Geeste at Bremerhaven

Location
- Country: Germany
- State: Lower Saxony

Physical characteristics
- Mouth
  - location: Weser
  - coordinates: 53°32′15″N 8°34′55″E
- Length: 40.1 km (24.9 mi)
- Basin size: 338 km^{2} (131 sq mi)

Basin features
- Progression: Weser→ North Sea

The Geeste is a river in Lower Saxony, Germany. It rises near the village of Hipstedt and falls into the Weser at Bremerhaven after a course of some 40 km (25 mi). It is the Weser's lowest tributary. The lower reaches of the Geeste are navigable and form part of the Elbe–Weser waterway.

A barrier system at Bremerhaven prevents storm surges from moving up the Geeste and flooding the surrounding districts. This was completed in 1961, just in time for the North Sea flood of 1962.

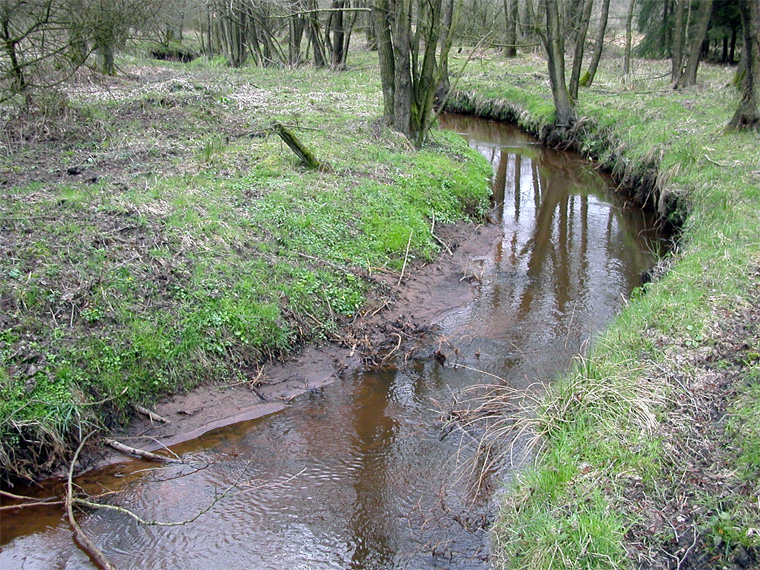
The Geeste near its source

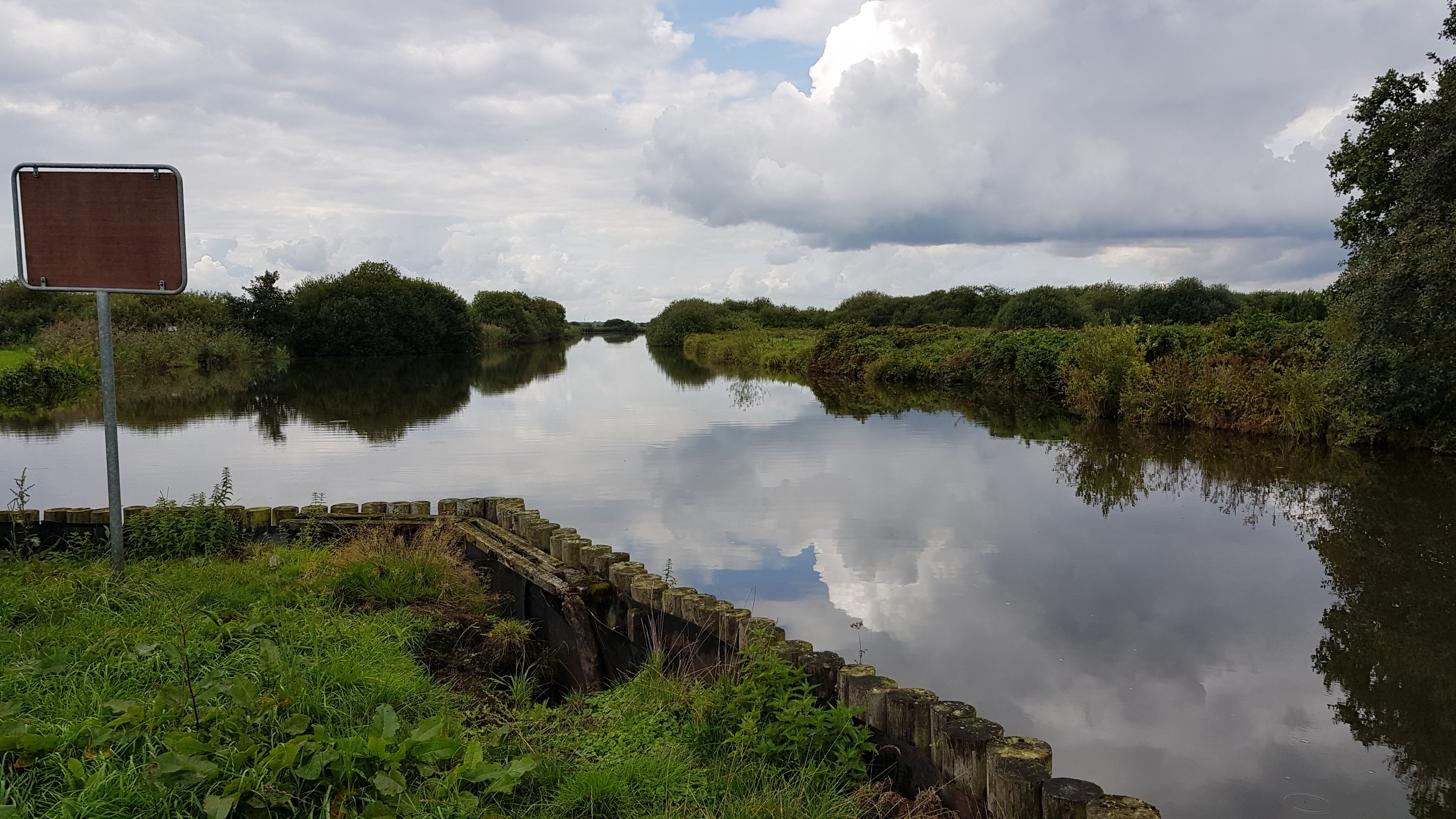
The river's junction with the Elbe canal

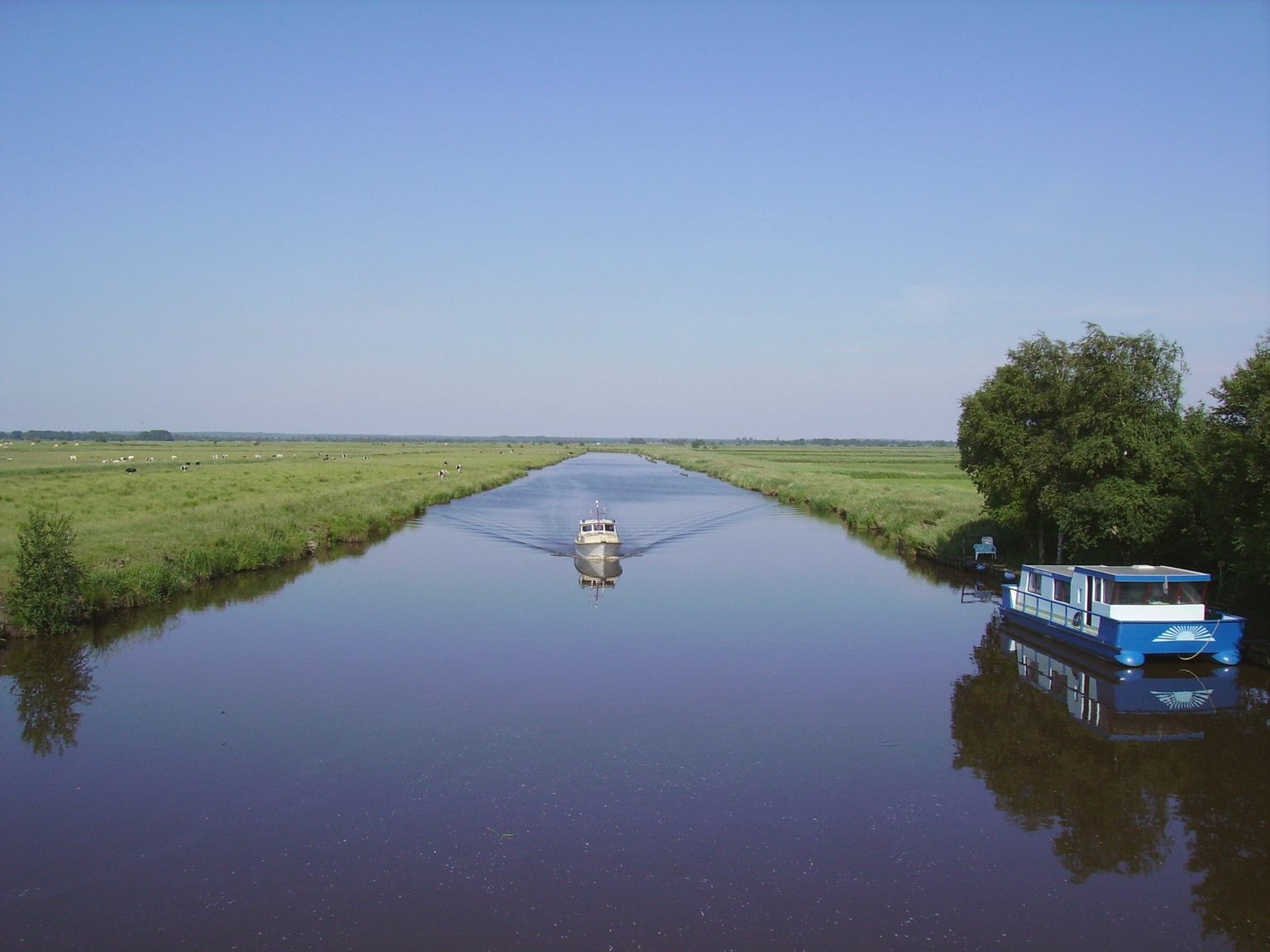
A vessel motoring along the Geeste

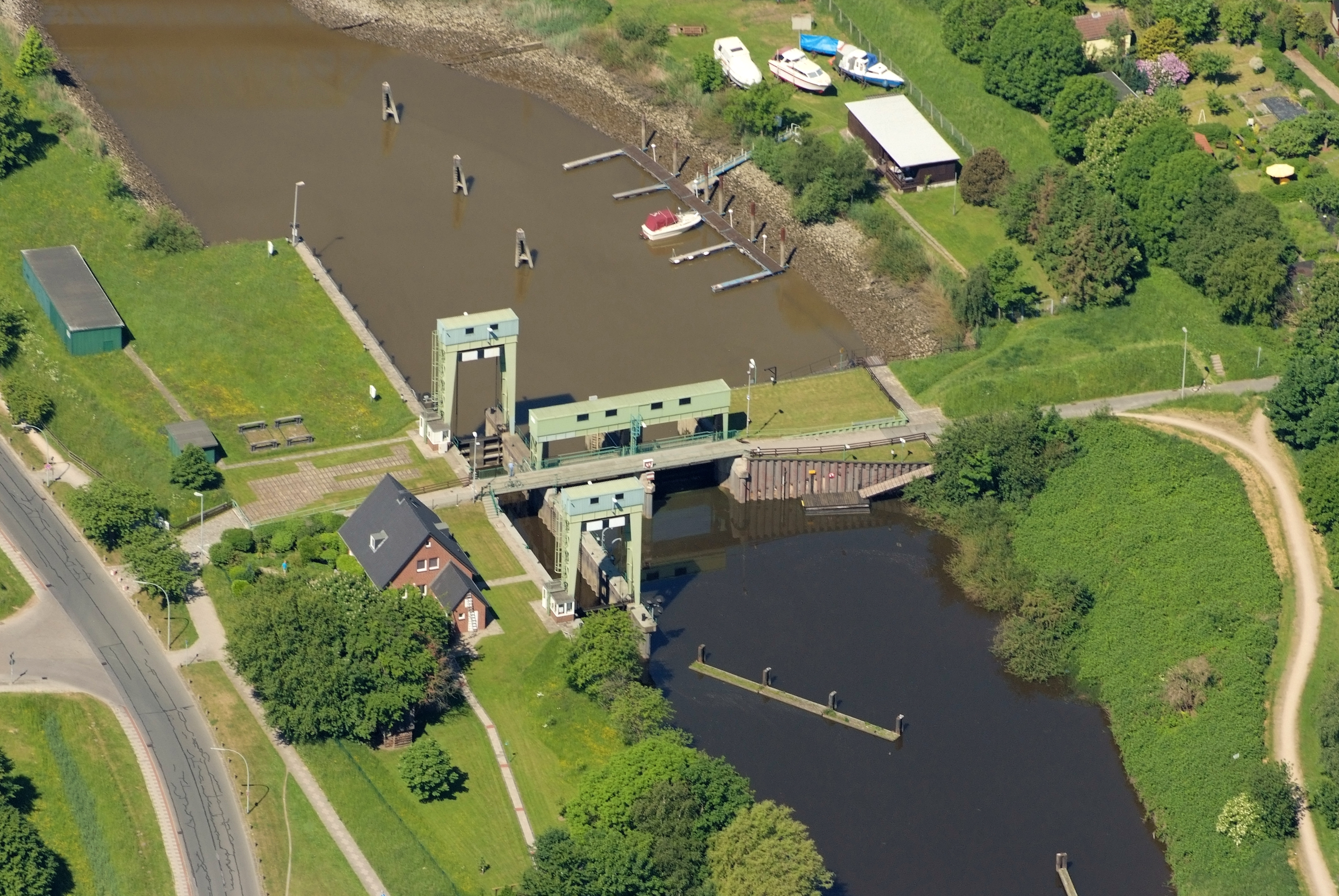
Sluice at Bremerhaven

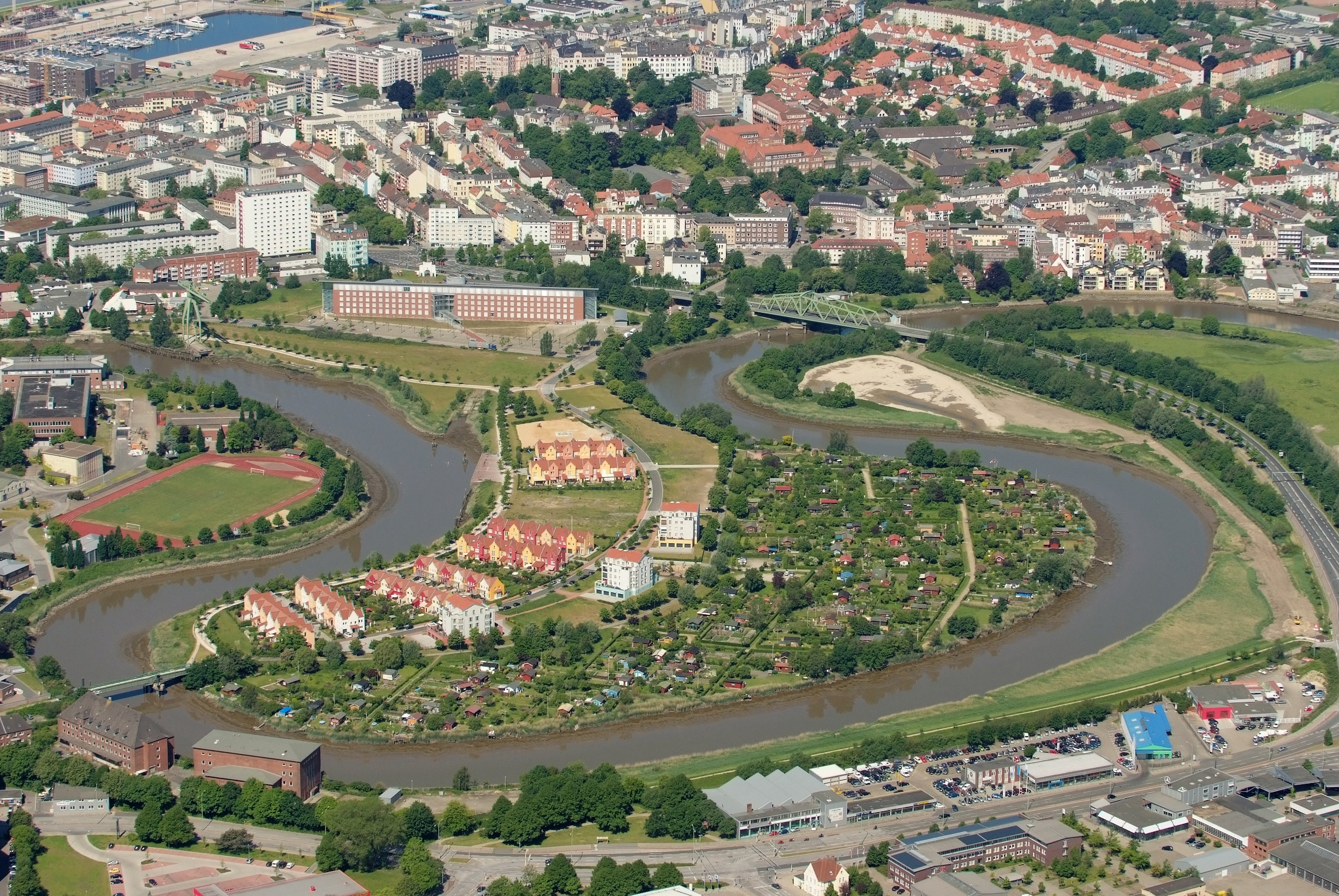
Meander at Bremerhaven

== See also ==
- List of rivers of Lower Saxony
- List of rivers of Bremen
