= Ina Müller =

German singer-songwriter

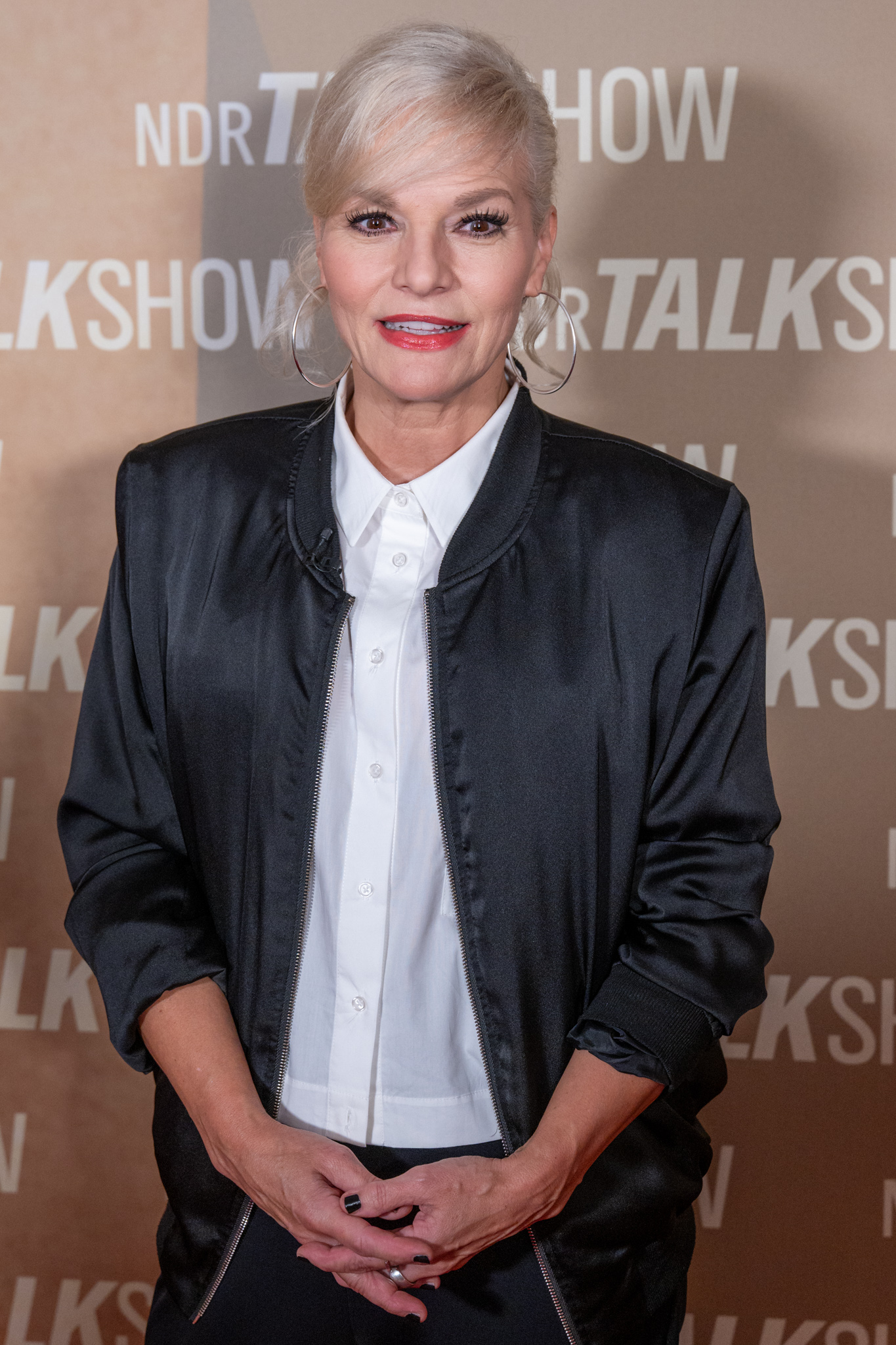
- Müller in 2023.

Background information
- Born: 25 July 1965 (age 60)
- Origin: Köhlen, Germany
- Genres: Pop; Chanson
- Occupation: Singer-songwriter
- Years active: 1994–present
- Website: inamueller.de

Ina Müller (born 25 July 1965) is a German singer-songwriter, comedian, television host, and author.

== Early life ==
Müller was born into a farming family in Köhlen, Lower Saxony, West Germany. The fourth out of five sisters, she suffered from hospitalism until her teenage years. After her school graduation, Müller trained to be a pharmacy technician. The next years she worked for a number of pharmacies in Bremen, Munich and on Sylt.

== Career ==
In 1994, Müller and her friend Edda Schnittgard founded the comedy duo Queen Bee.

From 2007, Müller has hosted the popular late-night music and variety television show Inas Nacht (Ina's Night), broadcast on NDR and originating from a pub in Hamburg.

== Discography ==
=== Studio albums ===
Title	Album details	Peak positions			Certifications
Title	Album details	GER	AUT	SWI	Certifications
Das große Du	Released: 1 June 2004; Label: Tarumton; Formats: CD, digital download	—	—	—	
Weiblich, ledig, 40	Released: 13 October 2006; Label: 105 Music; Formats: CD, digital download	26	—	—	BVMI: 3× Gold
Liebe macht taub	Released: 28 March 2008; Label: 105 Music; Formats: CD, digital download	6	—	—	BVMI: Platinum
Die Schallplatte – nied opleggt	Released: 30 October 2009; Label: 105 Music; Formats: CD, digital download	13	—	—	BVMI: Gold
Das wär dein Lied gewesen	Released: 18 February 2011; Label: 105 Music; Formats: CD, digital download	2	24	90	BVMI: Platinum
48	Released: 25 October 2013; Label: 105 Music; Formats: CD, digital download	3	22	52	BVMI: Platinum
Ich bin die	Released: 28 October 2016; Label: Sony; Formats: CD, digital download, LP	4	21	41	BVMI: Gold
55	Released: 20 November 2020; Label: Sony; Formats: CD, digital download	2	17	23	BVMI: Gold
6.0	Released: 14 November 2025; Label: Sony; Formats: CD, digital download, LP	1	9	29	
