= Ringstedt =

Ringstedt Ringst
- Ortsteil of Geestland
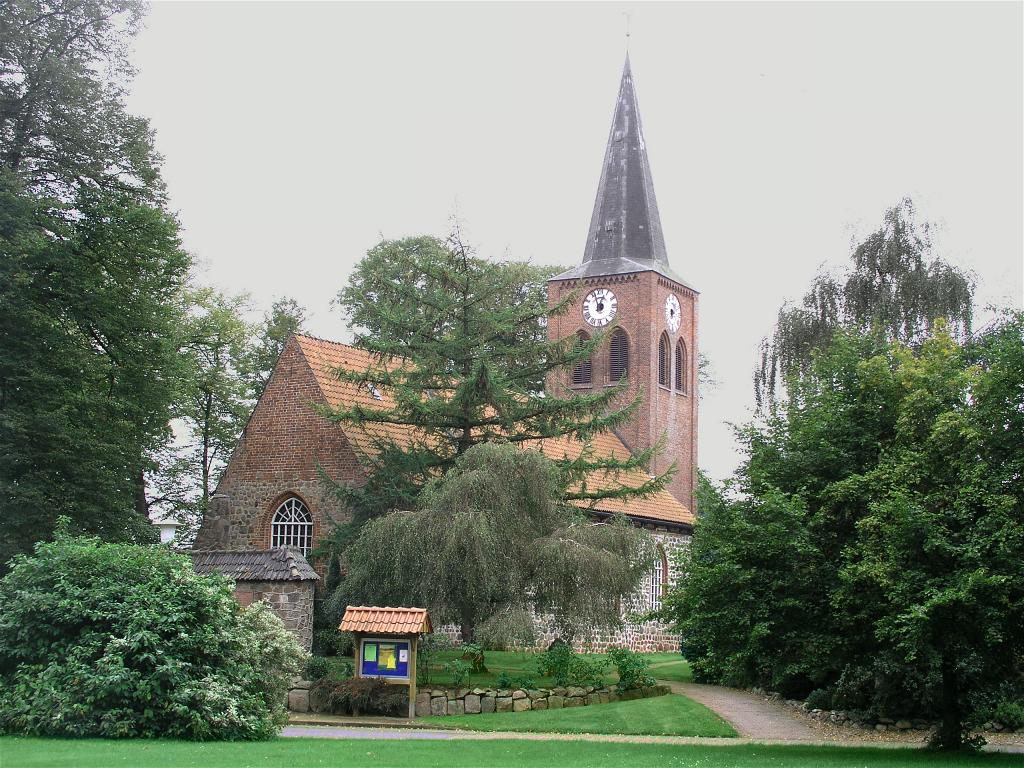
- Reformed-Lutheran simultaneum St. Fabian Church

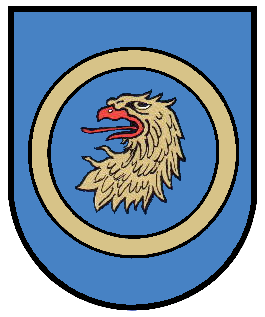
- Coat of arms
- Interactive map of Ringstedt
- Location within Germany Location within Lower Saxony
- Coordinates: 53°34′00″N 08°51′00″E
- Country: Germany
- State: Lower Saxony
- District: Cuxhaven
- Town: Geestland

Area
  - Total: 26.26 km^{2} (10.14 sq mi)
- Elevation: 7 m (23 ft)

Population (2013-12-31)
  - Total: 802
  - Density: 30.5/km^{2} (79.1/sq mi)
- Time zone: UTC+01:00 (CET)
  - Summer (DST): UTC+02:00 (CEST)
- Postal codes: 27624
- Dialling codes: 04708
- Vehicle registration: CUX
- Website: www.ringstedt.de

Ringstedt (German pronunciation: [ˈʁɪŋʃtɛt]; Low German: Rings; literally in Ring Stead) is a village and a former municipality in the district of Cuxhaven, in Lower Saxony, Germany. Since 1 January 2015 it is part of the town of Geestland.

== History ==
Ringstedt belonged to the Prince-Archbishopric of Bremen, established in 1180. In 1648 it was transformed into the Duchy of Bremen, which was first ruled in personal union by the Swedish Crown – interrupted by a Danish occupation (1712–1715) – and from 1715 on by the Hanoverian Crown.

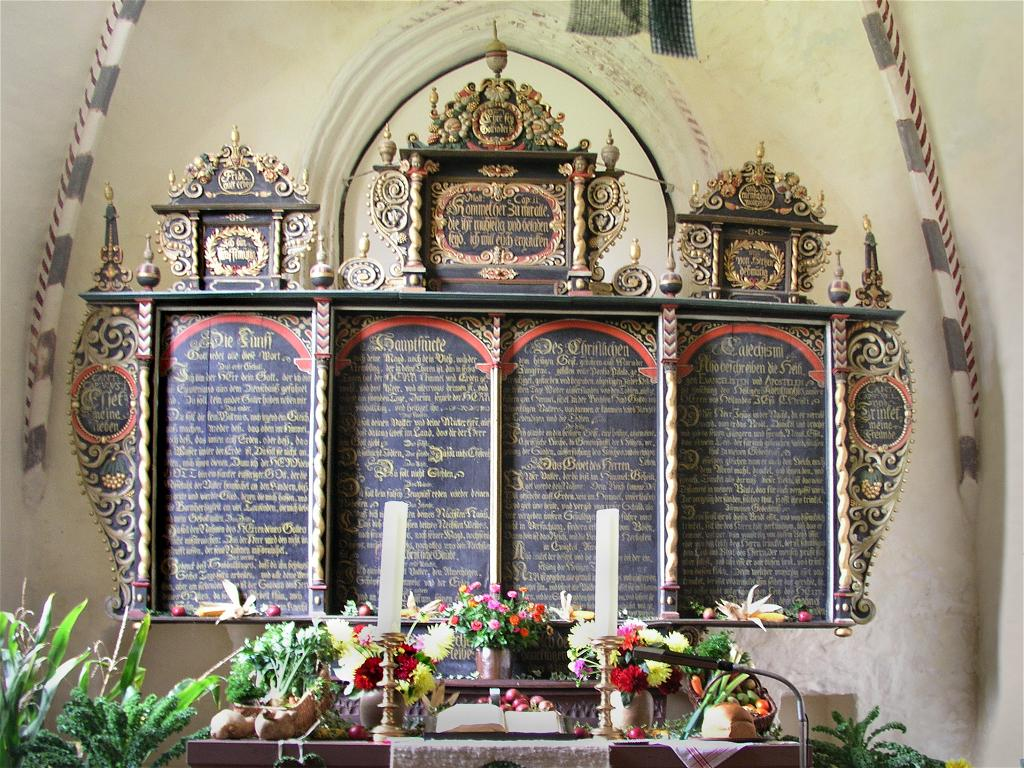
St. Fabian Church:The Lutheran altar showing no crucifix, but only candles following the compromise between the Reformed Aniconism and Lutheran Adiaphora.

In 1807 the ephemeric Kingdom of Westphalia annexed the Duchy of Bremen, before France annexed it in 1810. In 1813 the Duchy of Bremen was restored to the Electorate of Hanover, which – after its upgrade to the Kingdom of Hanover in 1814 – incorporated it in a real union. The ducal territory, including Ringstedt, became part of the new Stade Region, established in 1823.

Ringstedt is twinned with the Kentish village of West Farleigh in England. This relationship was built on many years of friendship developed through both communities and their sports clubs.

== Sights ==
St. Fabian Church (est. 13th century), a simultaneum of Reformed and Lutheran congregants.
