= Kührstedt =

- Ortsteil of Geestland
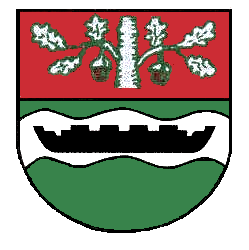
- Coat of arms
- Interactive map of Kührstedt
- Location within Germany Location within Lower Saxony
- Coordinates: 53°34′41″N 08°48′05″E
- Country: Germany
- State: Lower Saxony
- District: Cuxhaven
- Town: Geestland
- Subdivisions: 2 Ortsteile

Area
  - Total: 25.6 km^{2} (9.9 sq mi)
- Elevation: 5 m (16 ft)

Population (2013-12-31)
  - Total: 999
  - Density: 39.0/km^{2} (101/sq mi)
- Time zone: UTC+01:00 (CET)
  - Summer (DST): UTC+02:00 (CEST)
- Postal codes: 27624
- Dialling codes: 04708, 04745
- Vehicle registration: CUX
- Website: www.bad-bederkesa.de

Kührstedt (German pronunciation: [ˈkyːɐ̯ʃtɛt]) is a village and a former municipality in the district of Cuxhaven, in Lower Saxony, Germany. Since 1 January 2015 it is part of the town Geestland.

Kührstedt belonged to the Prince-Archbishopric of Bremen, established in 1180. In 1648 the Prince-Archbishopric was transformed into the Duchy of Bremen, which was first ruled in personal union by the Swedish Crown - interrupted by a Danish occupation (1712–1715) - and from 1715 on by the Hanoverian Crown. The Kingdom of Hanover incorporated the Duchy in a real union and the Ducal territory, including Kührstedt, became part of the new Stade Region, established in 1823.
