= Bad Bederkesa =

Ortsteil of Geestland in Lower Saxony, Germany

- Ortsteil of Geestland
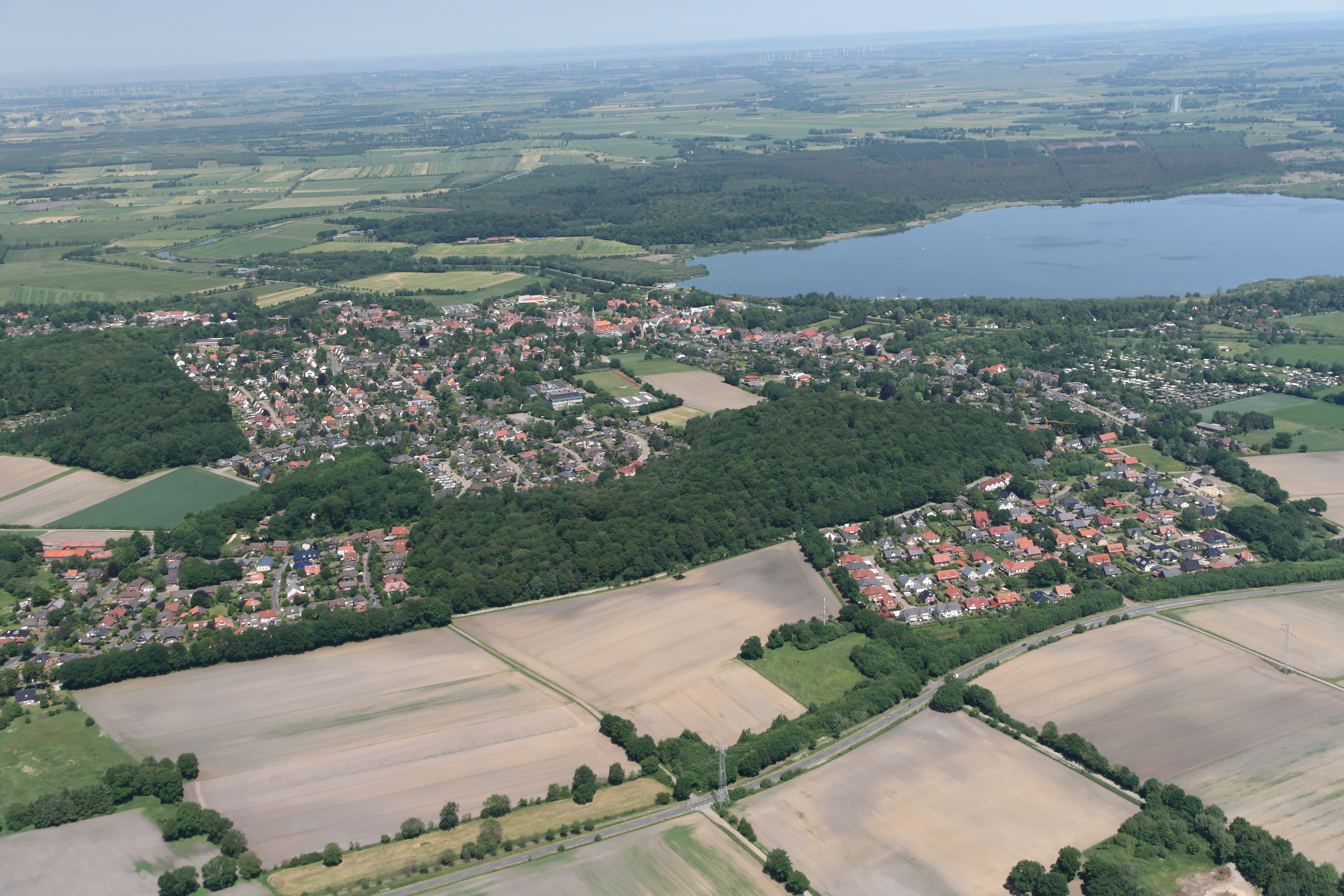
- Aerial view with the Lake Bederkesa

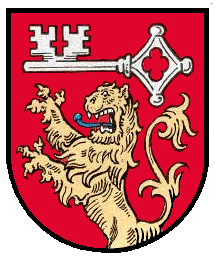
- Coat of arms

- Location of Bad Bederkesa within Geestland
- Interactive map of Bad Bederkesa
- Location within Germany Location within Lower Saxony
- Coordinates: 53°37′34″N 08°50′34″E
- Country: Germany
- State: Lower Saxony
- District: Cuxhaven
- Town: Geestland

Area
  - Total: 43.17 km^{2} (16.67 sq mi)
- Elevation: 9 m (30 ft)

Population (2013-12-31)
  - Total: 5,227
  - Density: 121.1/km^{2} (313.6/sq mi)
- Time zone: UTC+01:00 (CET)
  - Summer (DST): UTC+02:00 (CEST)
- Postal codes: 27624
- Dialling codes: 04745
- Vehicle registration: CUX
- Website: geestland.eu

Bad Bederkesa (German pronunciation: [baːt ˈbeːdɐkeːza]; Low German: Beers) is a village and a former municipality in the district of Cuxhaven, in Lower Saxony, Germany. Since 1 January 2015 it is part of the town of Geestland. It is situated approximately 20 km northeast of Bremerhaven, and 30 km southeast of Cuxhaven. Bad Bederkesa was the seat of the former Samtgemeinde ("collective municipality") Bederkesa, an administrative division consisting of several component municipalities.

== History ==
Bad Bederkesa belonged to the Prince-Archbishopric of Bremen (est. as principality of imperial immediacy in 1180). The Knights of Bederkesa, like all the place, had been struck by the plague in 1349/1350, completely extinguishing many knightly family lines. The declining knightly family dropped deep into debt, and – having already sold many a possession – had even pawned half the say in the Bailiwick of Bederkesa (Amt Bederkesa) to the aspiring Mandelsloh family.

They again lost this pawn to the city of Bremen, when in 1381 its troops stopped the three Mandelsloh brothers in their attempt to leverage influence from lending to Prince-Archbishop Albert II into territorial power. The Mandelslohs and other robber barons from the Prince-Bishopric of Verden and the Prince-Archbishopric of Bremen ravaged burghers of the city of Bremen and people in the entire prince-archbishopric.

In 1381 the city's troops successfully ended the brigandage and captured the Castle of Bederkesa and the pertaining bailiwick. Thus Bremen gained its foothold as to uphold peace and order in its forecourt on the lower Weser course. In 1386 the city of Bremen became the liege lord of the noble families, holding the estates of Altluneburg and Elmlohe, previously vassals of the Knights of Bederkesa.

In 1411 the jointly ruling dukes of Saxe-Lauenburg, father Eric IV and his sons Eric V and John IV, pawned their share in the Vogtei over the Bederkesa Bailiwick and in the castle to the Senate of Bremen including all "they have in the jurisdictions in the Frisian Land of Wursten and in Lehe, which belongs to the afore-mentioned castle and Vogtei". Their share in jurisdiction, Vogtei and castle had been acquired from the plague-stricken Knights of Bederkesa. In 1421, Bremen acquired also the remaining half in the say of the Bederkesa Knights including their remaining share in the Bederkesa Castle.

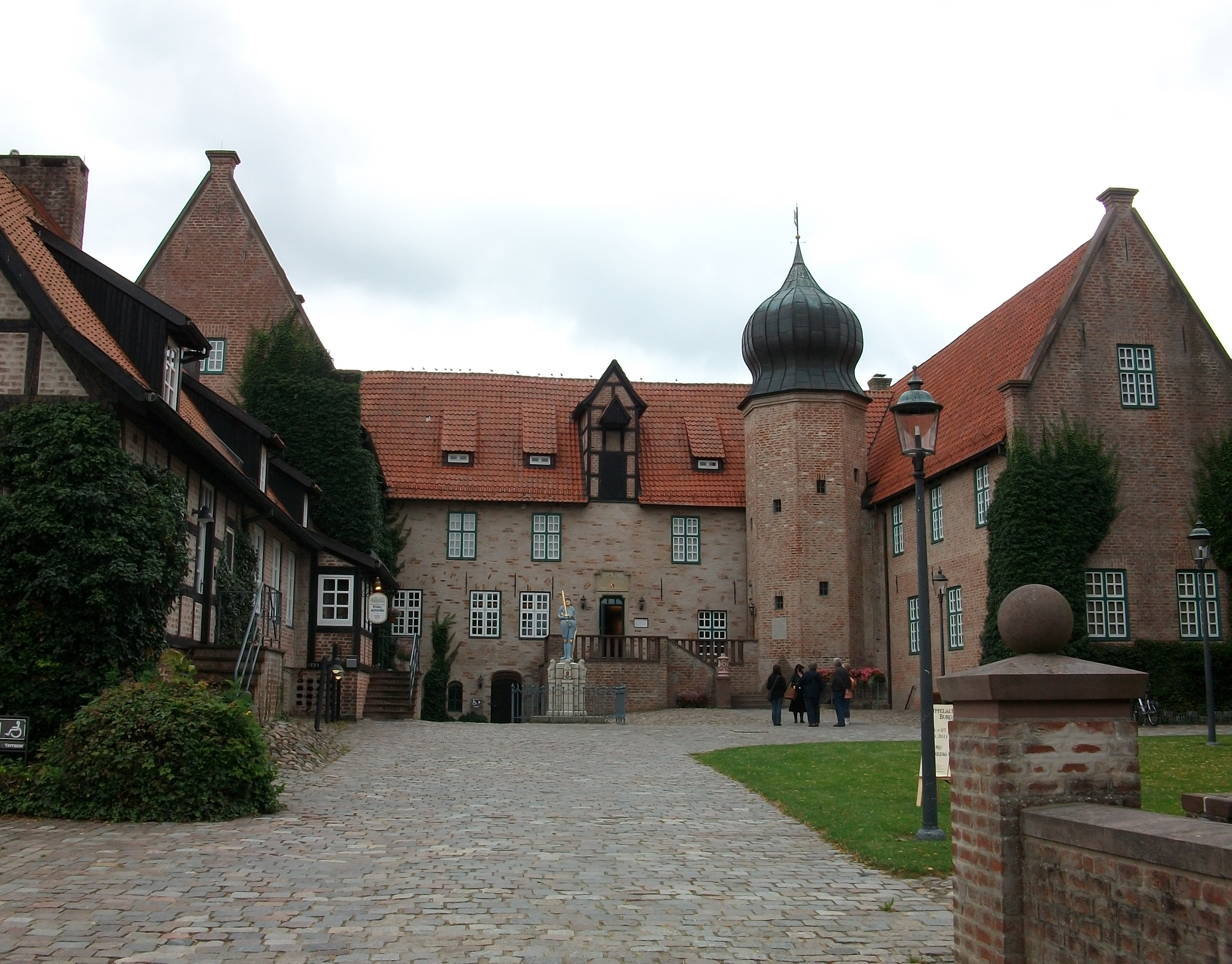
Bederkesa Castle, since 1381 stronghold of the City of Bremen's possessions within the Duchy of Bremen, in 1654 ceded to the latter.

In 1648 the Prince-Archbishopric was transformed into the Duchy of Bremen, which was first ruled in personal union by the Swedish Crown. In November 1654, after the Second Bremian War, Bremen had to cede Bederkesa and Lehe to the Duchy of Bremen (First Stade Treaty). In 1715 the Duchy of Bremen became a fief to the House of Hanover. In 1807 the ephemeral Kingdom of Westphalia annexed the Duchy, before France annexed it in 1810. In 1813 the Duchy was restored to the Electorate of Hanover, which - after its upgrade to the Kingdom of Hanover in 1814 - incorporated the Duchy in a real union and the Ducal territory, including Bederkesa, became part of the new Stade Region, established in 1823.
