= Geestland =

- Town
- Flag Coat of arms

- Location of Geestland within Cuxhaven district
- Interactive map of Geestland
- Location within Germany Location within Lower Saxony
- Coordinates: 53°38′N 8°45′E
- Country: Germany
- State: Lower Saxony
- District: Cuxhaven

Government
  - Mayor (2021–26): Thorsten Krüge

Area
  - Total: 356.56 km^{2} (137.67 sq mi)

Population (2025-12-31)
  - Total: 31,182
  - Density: 87.452/km^{2} (226.50/sq mi)
- Time zone: UTC+01:00 (CET)
  - Summer (DST): UTC+02:00 (CEST)
- Postal codes: 27607, 27624
- Dialling codes: 04704, 04707, 04708, 0471, 04742, 04743, 04745, 04756, 04765
- Vehicle registration: CUX

Geestland (German pronunciation: [ɡeːstˌlant]) is a town in the district of Cuxhaven, in Lower Saxony, Germany. It was formed on 1 January 2015 by the merger of the former municipalities of Langen bei Bremerhaven, Bad Bederkesa, Drangstedt, Elmlohe, Flögeln, Köhlen, Kührstedt, Lintig and Ringstedt.

== Twin towns – sister cities ==
Geestland is twinned with:

- Tozeur, Tunisia
