= Flögeln =

- Ortsteil of Geestland
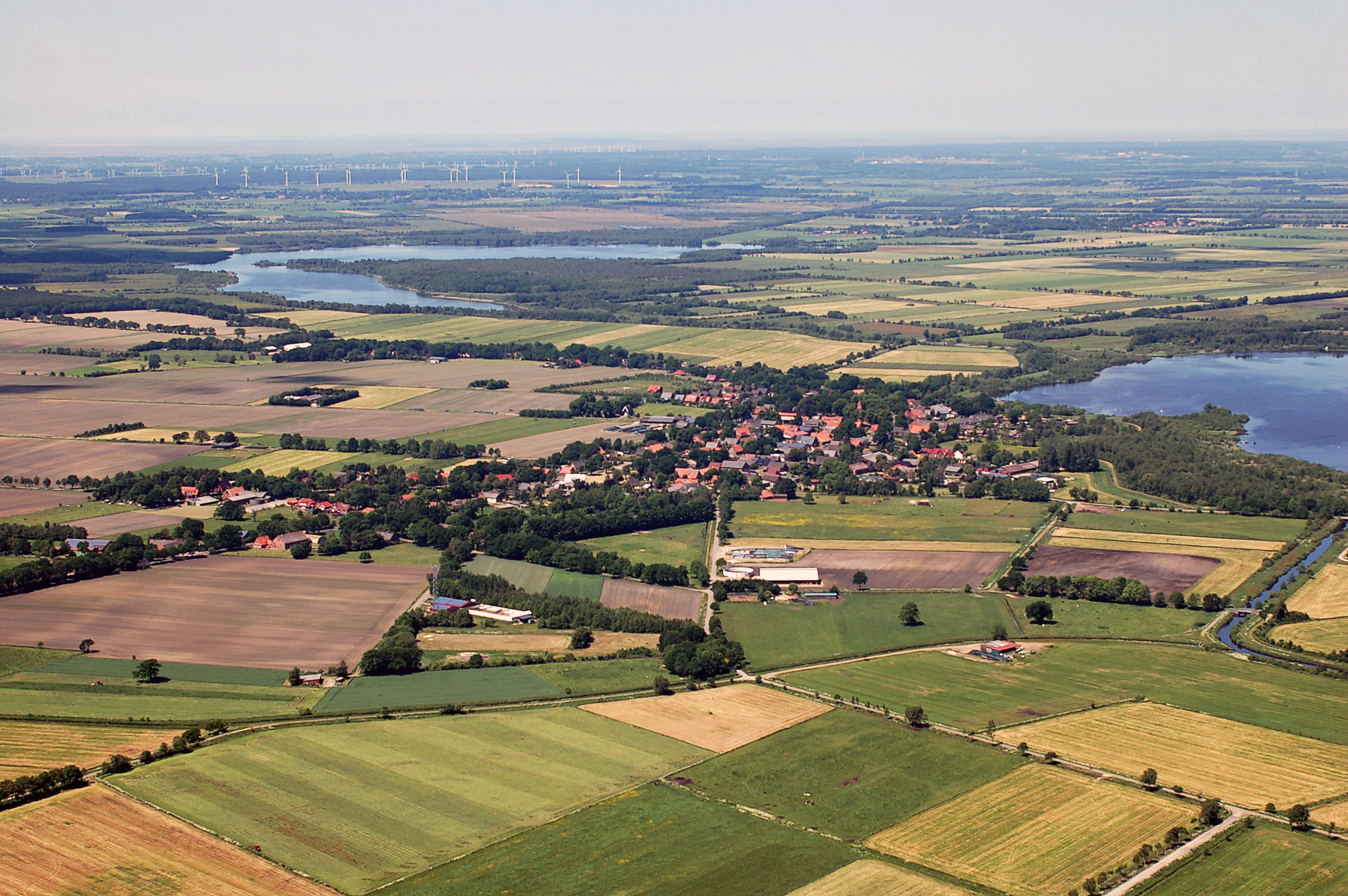
- Aerial view with the lakes of Dahlem-Halem (l), and of Flögeln (r)

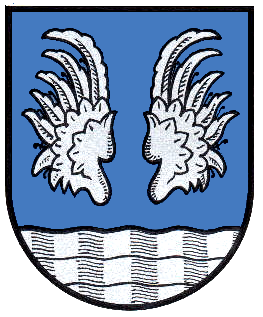
- Coat of arms
- Interactive map of Flögeln
- Location within Germany Location within Lower Saxony
- Coordinates: 53°39′35″N 8°48′27″E
- Country: Germany
- State: Lower Saxony
- District: Cuxhaven
- Town: Geestland

Area
  - Total: 25.26 km^{2} (9.75 sq mi)
- Elevation: 0 m (0 ft)

Population (2013-12-31)
  - Total: 626
  - Density: 24.8/km^{2} (64.2/sq mi)
- Time zone: UTC+01:00 (CET)
  - Summer (DST): UTC+02:00 (CEST)
- Postal codes: 27624
- Dialling codes: 04745
- Vehicle registration: CUX
- Website: www.floegeln.de

Flögeln (German pronunciation: [ˈfløːgl̩n]) is a village and a former municipality in the district of Cuxhaven, in Lower Saxony, Germany. Since 1 January 2015 it is part of the town Geestland.

== History ==
Flögeln belonged to the Prince-Archbishopric of Bremen, established in 1180. The local prince-archiepiscopal vassals were the Ministeriales of Flögeln. On their emigration to Hamburg in 1375, where they adopted a civic career, they made over Flögeln proper and six more villages to the Neuenwalde Convent. Their Dornburg Castle was taken over by the prince-archbishopric as another military outpost.

In 1648 the Prince-Archbishopric was transformed into the Duchy of Bremen, which was first ruled in personal union by the Swedish Crown - interrupted by a Danish occupation (1712–1715) - and from 1715 on by the Hanoverian Crown. In 1807 the ephemeric Kingdom of Westphalia annexed the Duchy, before France annexed it in 1810. In 1813 the Duchy was restored to the Electorate of Hanover, which - after its upgrade to the Kingdom of Hanover in 1814 - incorporated the Duchy in a real union and the Ducal territory, including Flögeln, became part of the new Stade Region, established in 1823.
