= Köhlen =

- Ortsteil of Geestland
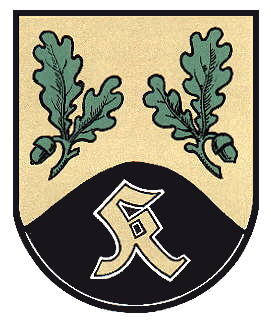
- Coat of arms
- Interactive map of Köhlen
- Location within Germany Location within Lower Saxony
- Coordinates: 53°32′26″N 08°52′38″E
- Country: Germany
- State: Lower Saxony
- District: Cuxhaven
- Town: Geestland
- Subdivisions: 8 Ortsteile

Area
  - Total: 26.72 km^{2} (10.32 sq mi)
- Elevation: 8 m (26 ft)

Population (2013-12-31)
  - Total: 937
  - Density: 35.1/km^{2} (90.8/sq mi)
- Time zone: UTC+01:00 (CET)
  - Summer (DST): UTC+02:00 (CEST)
- Postal codes: 27624
- Dialling codes: 04708
- Vehicle registration: CUX
- Website: www.bad-bederkesa.de

Köhlen (German pronunciation: [ˈkøːlən]) is a village and a former municipality in the district of Cuxhaven, in Lower Saxony, Germany. Since 1 January 2015 it is part of the town Geestland.

Köhlen belonged to the Prince-Archbishopric of Bremen, established in 1180. In 1648, the Prince-Archbishopric was transformed into the Duchy of Bremen, which was first ruled in personal union by the Swedish Crown - interrupted by a Danish occupation (1712–1715) - and from 1715 on by the Hanoverian Crown. In 1807, the ephemeric Kingdom of Westphalia annexed the Duchy before France annexed it in 1810. In 1813, the Duchy was restored to the Electorate of Hanover, which - after its upgrade to the Kingdom of Hanover in 1814 - incorporated the Duchy in a real union and the Ducal territory, including Köhlen, became part of the new Stade Region, established in 1823.

== People ==
- Ina Müller (born 1965), German singer-songwriter, comedian, television host, and author
