= Langen, Cuxhaven =

Langen bei Bremerhaven
- Ortsteil of Geestland
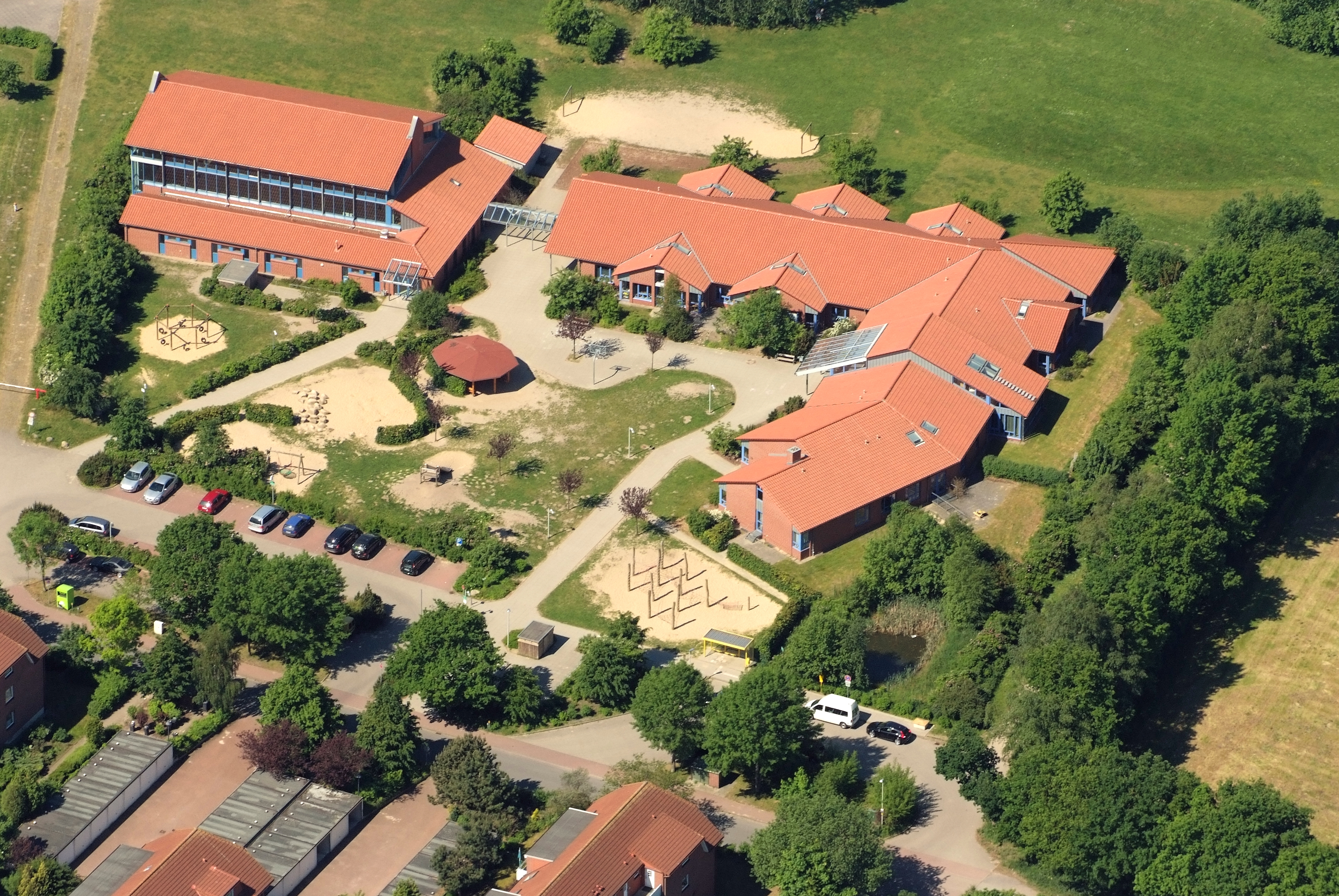
- Langen Elementary School in 2012

- Flag Coat of arms
- Interactive map of Langen bei Bremerhaven
- Location within Germany Location within Lower Saxony
- Coordinates: 53°37′N 8°35′E
- Country: Germany
- State: Lower Saxony
- District: Cuxhaven
- Town: Geestland

Area
  - Total: 121.6 km^{2} (47.0 sq mi)
- Elevation: 14 m (46 ft)

Population (2013-12-31)
  - Total: 18,330
  - Density: 150.7/km^{2} (390.4/sq mi)
- Time zone: UTC+01:00 (CET)
  - Summer (DST): UTC+02:00 (CEST)
- Postal codes: 27607
- Dialling codes: 04743
- Vehicle registration: CUX
- Website: geestland.eu

Langen (German pronunciation: [ˈlaŋən]) is a town and a former municipality in the district of Cuxhaven, in Lower Saxony, Germany. Since 1 January 2015 it is part of the town Geestland. It is situated approximately 7 km north of the centre of Bremerhaven, and 30 km south of Cuxhaven.

== History ==
Langen belonged to the Prince-Archbishopric of Bremen, established in 1180. In 1648 the Prince-Archbishopric was transformed into the Duchy of Bremen, which was first ruled in personal union by the Swedish Crown - interrupted by a Danish occupation (1712–1715) - and from 1715 on by the Hanoverian Crown. The Kingdom of Hanover incorporated the Duchy in a real union and the Ducal territory became part of the new Stade Region, established in 1823.

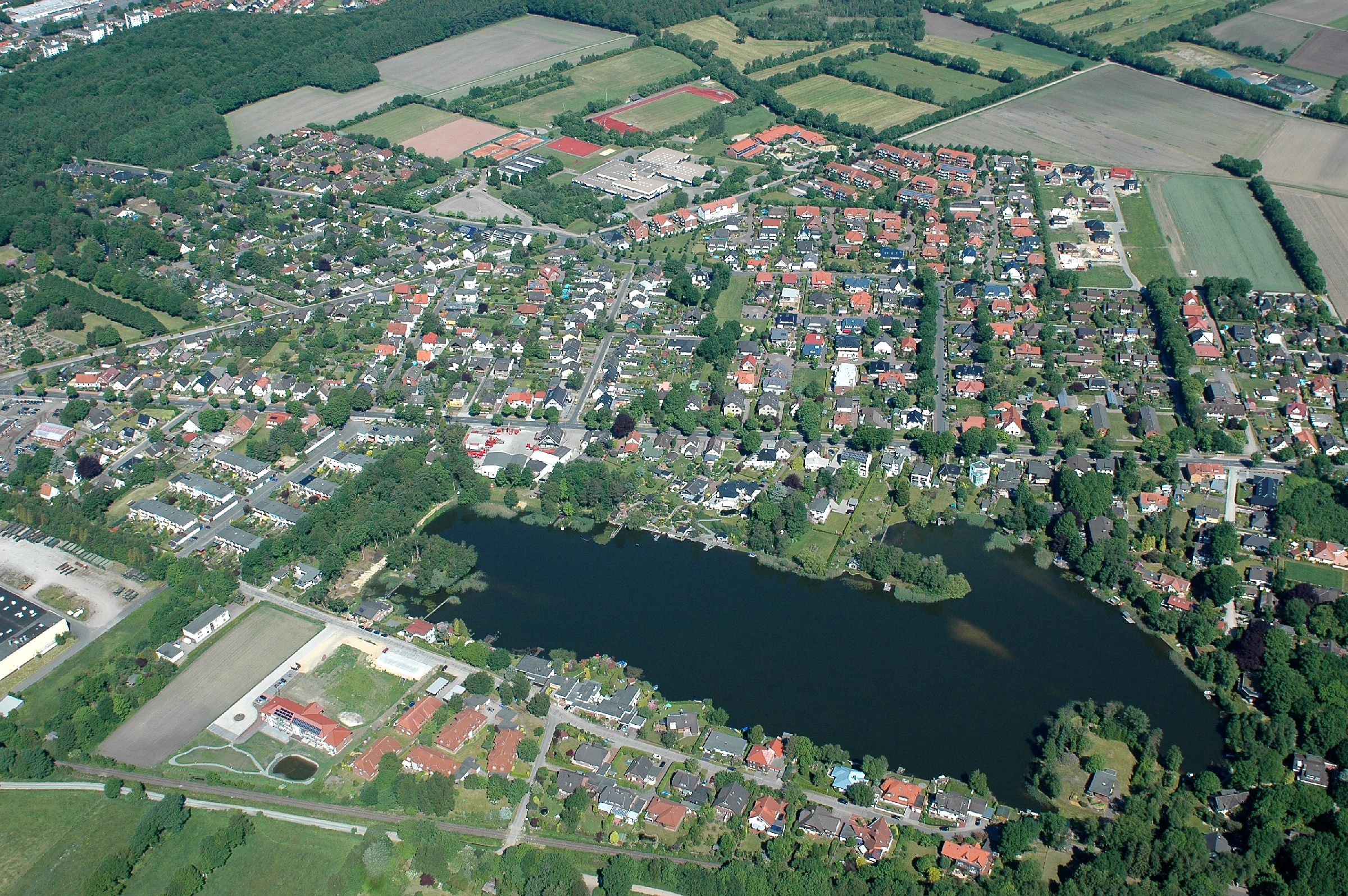
Langen with the flooded gravel pit Baggerkuhle I (aerial view 2012)
