= Lower Saxon State Department for Waterway, Coastal and Nature Conservation =

- NLWKN

Agency overview
- Formed: 1 January 2005 (21 years ago)
- Jurisdiction: Government of Lower Saxony
- Headquarters: Norden, Germany
- Employees: 1500 (2025)
- Minister responsible: State Environmental Minister
- Agency executive: Anne Rickmeyer, Director
- Website: www.nlwkn.de

The Lower Saxon Department for Water, Coastal and Nature Conservation (NLWKN) (German: Niedersächsischer Landesbetrieb für Wasserwirtschaft, Küsten- und Naturschutz) is a department of the state of Lower Saxony, with its headquarters in Norden (Ostfriesland) and is responsible to the Minister for the Environment and Climate Protection of Lower Saxony.

Main tasks are water management, nature conservation and coastal protection on the state level.

== Departements ==
NLWKN is structured in relatively independent departements for different services at Norden, Hanover and Lüneburg:

- Operation and maintenance of state-owned facilities and bodies of water, combating pollutant accidents, based in Norden
- Planning and construction of water management systems, based in Norden
- River basin management, state hydrological service, radiological monitoring, based in Norden
- General administration, finance, human resources, based in Norden
- Regional nature conservation, based in Hanover
- State-wide nature conservation, based in Hanover
- Allgemeine Verwaltung, Finanzen, Personal, Sitz in Norden
- Water management legislation, based in Lüneburg
- stae wide nature conservation, based in Hanover
- Coastal Research Center, based in Norden, formerly in Norderney

== NLWKN services ==
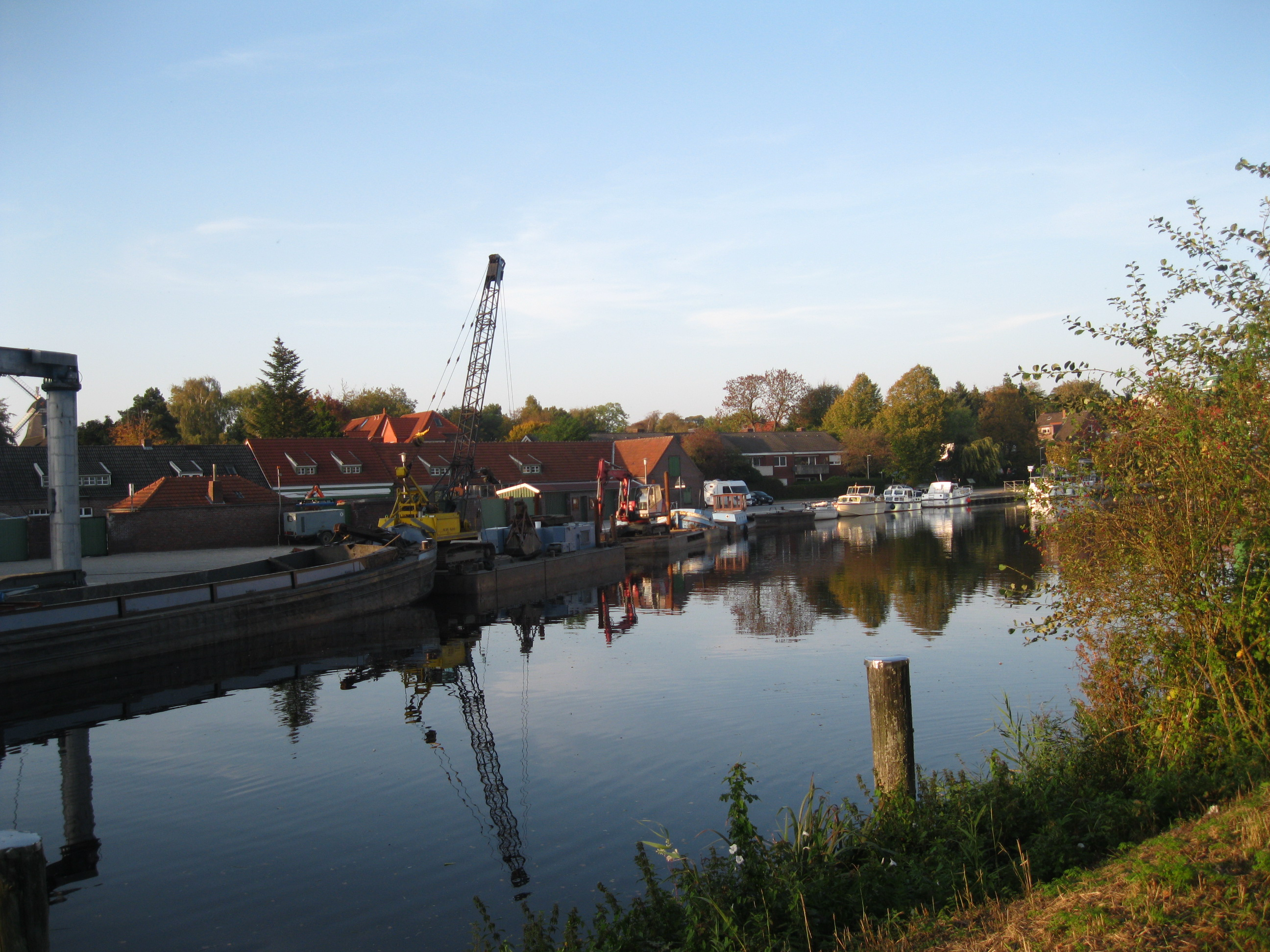
Ship's quay of NLWKN at Aurich harbour

- national flood reporting service in the catchment areas of the Weser, Aller and Leine
- national storm surge warning service for the Lower Saxon coast
- current water level data (gauge measurements) for the Weser and Ems

== History ==
The predecessor of today's NLWKN was the State Office for Water Management and Coastal Protection (Niedersächsischer Landesbetrieb für Wasserwirtschaft und Küstenschutz, NLWK). NLWKN was founded on January 1, 1998. As part of a reform of environmental administration in Lower Saxony at the instigation of the then Environment Minister Hans-Heinrich Sander (FDP), the core authority for nature conservation, the Lower Saxony State Office for Ecology (Niedersächsisches Landesamt für Ökologie, NLÖ) was merged with the dike protection department NLWK. NLÖ was dissolved.

In 2007, the NLWKN presented a "General Coastal Protection Plan" for the main dikes on the Lower Saxony mainland, intended to protect the coasts from the rising sea levels.
