= Osten Transporter Bridge =

Coordinates: 53°41′39.45″N 9°10′58.89″E

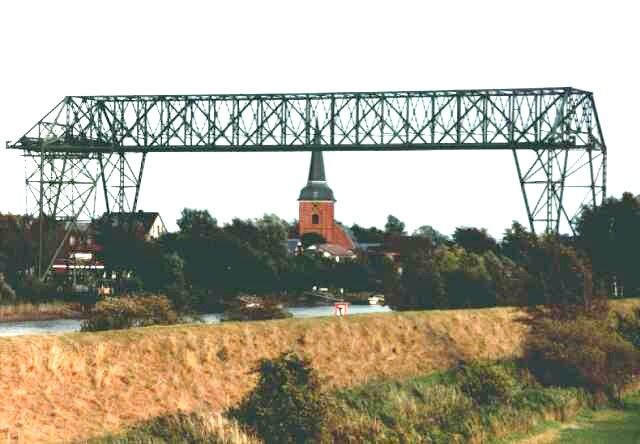

Osten Transporter Bridge is an 80-metre (262 ft) long transporter bridge over the Oste River in Osten (Oste), Lower Saxony, Germany. It was built in 1908-9 and was in regular use until 1974 and is now only used as a tourist attraction. The bridge can transport 6 cars or 100 persons simultaneously.
