= Transporter bridge =

Movable bridge that carries a segment of roadway across an obstacle

- Operation of a small transporter bridge at Maarsserbrug
- Material: Steel
- Movable: Yes

A transporter bridge, also known as a ferry bridge or aerial transfer bridge, is a type of movable bridge that carries a segment of roadway across a river. The gondola is slung from a tall span by wires or a metal frame. The design has been used to cross navigable rivers or other bodies of water, where there is a requirement for ship traffic to be able to pass. This has been a rare type of bridge, with fewer than two dozen built. There are just twelve that continue to be used today.

== History ==
The concept of the transporter bridge was invented in 1873 by Charles Smith (1844–1882), the manager of an engine works in Hartlepool, England. He called it a "bridge ferry" and unsuccessfully presented his ideas to councils in Hartlepool, Middlesbrough, and Glasgow.

The first transporter bridge, Vizcaya Bridge was built between Las Arenas and Portugalete, Spain, in 1893. The design from Alberto Palacio inspired others to attempt similar structures. The idea came about in locations where it was seen as impractical to build long approach ramps that would be required to reach a high span, and in places where ferries are not easily able to cross. Because transporter bridges can carry only a limited load, the idea was little used after the rise of the automobile.

The first such bridge built in France, the 1898 Rouen bridge crossing the Seine, was destroyed by the French Army to slow down German troops in World War II. Transporter bridges were popular in France, where five were erected and another partially completed.

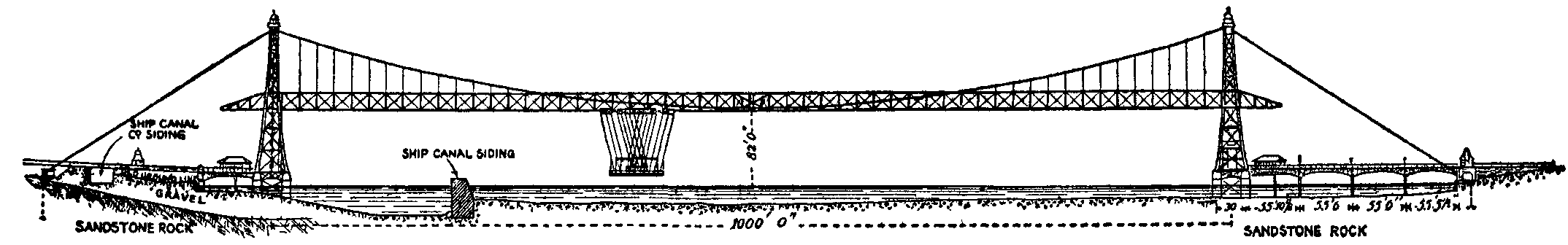
The Widnes–Runcorn Transporter Bridge was the first in Britain and the largest transporter bridge in the world.

The United Kingdom has four transporter bridges, though Warrington Transporter Bridge is disused and the modern Royal Victoria Dock Bridge, though designed with the potential to be used as a transporter bridge, has so far only been used as a high-level footbridge. The Newport Transporter Bridge was built in 1906 across the River Usk in Newport. Because the river banks are very low at the crossing point (a few miles south of the city centre) a traditional bridge would need a very long approach ramp, and a ferry could not be used at low tide. The Newport Bridge was a Ferdinand Arnodin design. The Middlesbrough Transporter Bridge opened in 1911 crossing the River Tees. It was featured in the 2002 series of the popular British TV show Auf Wiedersehen, Pet; the programme's plot had the bridge being dismantled and re-erected in Arizona, US. The Widnes-Runcorn Transporter Bridge, demolished in the early 1960s, was the first of its type in Britain, and the largest ever built.

In the United States, two such bridges were built. The first was the Aerial Bridge built in Duluth, Minnesota in 1905, although the city had originally planned to build a vertical lift bridge at the site. The transporter design was used for about 25 years before the structure was reconfigured to lift a central span in 1930.

The second American transporter bridge was different from other designs and partially resembled gondola lifts used in mountainous regions. The Sky Ride was part of the 1933–34 Chicago World's Fair ("Century of Progress"). It was taken down after two years, and was the longest bridge of this type ever built at the time.

Two historic transporter bridges survive in Germany. The bridge at Rendsburg, from 1913 is two bridges in one: a railroad link crosses on the top span, and the suspended ferry carries traffic on the valley floor. The Osten Transporter Bridge at Osten is four years older and was the first transporter bridge in Germany.

== List of transporter bridges ==
=== Existing bridges ===
Bridge	Image	City	Country	Completed	Span	Clearance	Height	In Use?	Coordinates	Notes
Vizcaya Bridge		Portugalete/Getxo	Spain	1893	164 m (538 ft)	45 m (148 ft)	61.3 m (201 ft)	Yes	43°19′23″N 3°1′1″W	In use 24/7, passenger fare 0.45 euro in 2022 (1.60 at night), fares between 1.65 and 3.50 for vehicles. It was declared a World Heritage Site by Unesco in 2006. It has become a prototype for subsequent bridges.
Rochefort-Martrou Transporter Bridge		Rochefort, Charente-Maritime	France	1900	140 m (460 ft)	50 m (160 ft)	66.5 m (218 ft)	Yes	45°54′58″N 0°57′38″W	In use during the summer. This bridge may be seen in the film The Young Girls of Rochefort.
Aerial Lift Bridge		Duluth, Minnesota	United States	1905	120 m (390 ft)	41.1 m (135 ft)	69.5 m (228 ft)	No	46°46′44″N 92°5′34″W	No longer a transporter bridge; converted into a lift bridge in 1929, in use.
Newport Transporter Bridge		Newport	United Kingdom	1906	196.6 m (645 ft)	50 m (160 ft)	73.6 m (241 ft)	No The bridge is closed for restoration work and the construction of the new visitor centre.	51°34′14″N 2°59′8″W	Currently [2023] closed again for repairs and construction of the new visitor centre with a planned Summer 2024 (delayed to late 2026) reopening. Appears in the film Tiger Bay.
Osten Transporter Bridge		Osten	Germany	1909	80 m (260 ft)	30 m (98 ft)	38 m (125 ft)	Yes	53°41′39″N 9°10′58″E	In use, but only as a tourist attraction.
Middlesbrough Transporter Bridge		Middlesbrough	United Kingdom	1911	180 m (590 ft)	49 m (161 ft)	68 m (223 ft)	No. The bridge has been closed due to safety concerns. Refurbishment works are currently being developed with the aim to reopen the structure in 2032	54°35′4″N 1°13′40″W	The bridges future is currently in discussion with Mayor Sir Ben Houchen due to the £60M GBP it is estimated to cost for full repairs of the bridge to be put back into operation, residents have mixed opinions on this and there is currently a public consultation into whether it should get knocked down and replaced or repaired due to its significant history and pride in the local area of the Teesside.
Rendsburg High Bridge		Rendsburg	Germany	1913	140 m (460 ft)	42 m (138 ft)	68 m (223 ft)	Yes	54°17′37″N 9°40′56″E	Only known combo railroad/transporter bridge. Gondola was destroyed in a collision with a ship in 2016, but has been replaced by an exact replica in 2022.
Puente Transbordador Nicolás Avellaneda		Buenos Aires/Dock Sud	Argentina	1914	103.6 m (340 ft)	43.5 m (143 ft)	52 m (171 ft)	Yes	34°38′18″S 58°21′22″W	In use. It was closed in 1960 but was restored and reopened in September 2017.
Warrington Transporter Bridge		Warrington	United Kingdom	1916	57 m (187 ft)	23 m (75 ft)	27 m (89 ft)	No	53°23′1″N 2°36′27″W	Disused. Originally for rail wagons. Converted for road vehicles in 1940. Listed as an "ancient monument", but still at risk. (One of two originally at this site; the other, from 1905 did not survive.)
Puente Nicolás Avellaneda		Buenos Aires/Dock Sud	Argentina	1940	60 m (197 ft)	21 m (69 ft) (not lifted), 43 m (141 ft) (lifted)	57 m (187 ft)	Yes	34°38′17″S 58°21′21″W	Transporter bridge below a liftable section of a vertical lift bridge. Since 1960 only used, when the road on the bridge is closed for maintenance work.
Royal Victoria Dock Bridge		London	United Kingdom	1998	128 m (420 ft)	15 m (49 ft)	45 m (148 ft)	No	43°19′23″N 3°1′1″W	Designed to allow use as a transporter bridge but currently only in use as a high-level footbridge.
Erlebnisbrücke		Near Mönchengladbach	Germany	2003	24.3 m (80 ft)			Yes	51°14′17.1″N 6°28′28.52″E	Small human-powered transporter bridge.
Transborder nearby Hamrštejn		Liberec – Chrastava	Czechia	2010	23 m (75 ft)			Yes	50°47′16.51″N 14°58′12.55″E	Small human-powered transporter bridge.

=== Historic bridges ===
Bridge	Image	Location	Country	Completed	Span	Notes
Messrs. Crosfield’s Transporter Bridge 53°23′11.72″N 2°36′22.96″W		Warrington	United Kingdom	1905	76 m	demolished
Bizerta/Brest Transporter Bridge		Bizerta	Tunisia	1898	109 m	Moved to Brest, France in 1909, damaged 1944, demolished 1947.
Bordeaux Transporter Bridge		Bordeaux	France	—	400 m (total)	Started 1910, but never completed. Demolished, 1942.
Devil's Dyke Transporter Bridge		Devil's Dyke, Brighton	United Kingdom	1894	198 m	Demolished, 1909.
Kiel Transporter Bridge 54°19′19″N 10°09′43″E		Kiel	German Empire	1910	128 m	Demolished, 1923.
Maarsserbrug		Maarssen	The Netherlands	1938	88 m	Fixed bridge for regular traffic with transporter for agricultural usages, removed in 1959.
Marseille Transporter Bridge 43°17′39″N 5°21′49″E		Marseille	France	1905	165 m	Destroyed, 1944.
Nantes Transporter Bridge 47°12′31″N 1°33′57″W		Nantes	France	1903	141 m	Demolished, 1958.
Puente Transbordador Presidente Sáenz Peña		Buenos Aires	Argentina	1913		Demolished, 1965.
Puente Transbordador Presidente Urquiza		Buenos Aires	Argentina	1915		Demolished, 1968.
Ponte Alexandrino de Alencar 22°53′46″S 43°10′35″W		Rio de Janeiro	Brazil	1915	171 m	Demolished, 1935.
Rouen Transporter Bridge		Rouen	France	1898	142 m	Destroyed, 1940.
Sky Ride		Chicago, Illinois	United States	1933	564 m	Demolished, 1934.
Knoxville Transporter Bridge		Knoxville, Tennessee	United States	1894		Demolished.
Widnes-Runcorn Transporter Bridge 53°20′47.76″N 2°44′10.68″W		Widnes-Runcorn	United Kingdom	1905	304 m	Demolished, 1961.

== See also ==
- Movable bridges for a list of other movable bridge types
- Southwest Line
