= Hechthausen =

- Municipality
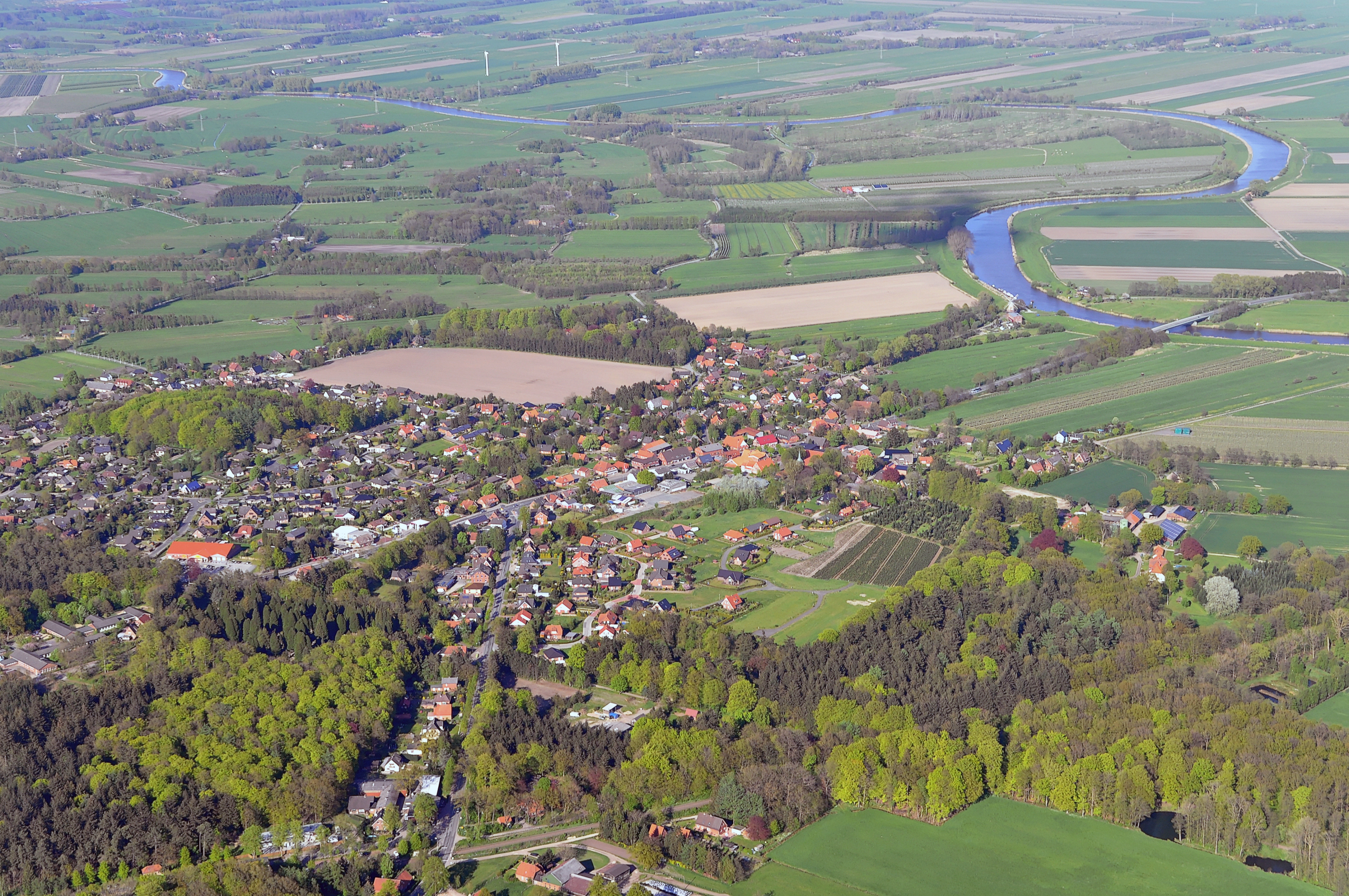
- Aerial view in 2012 with Oste

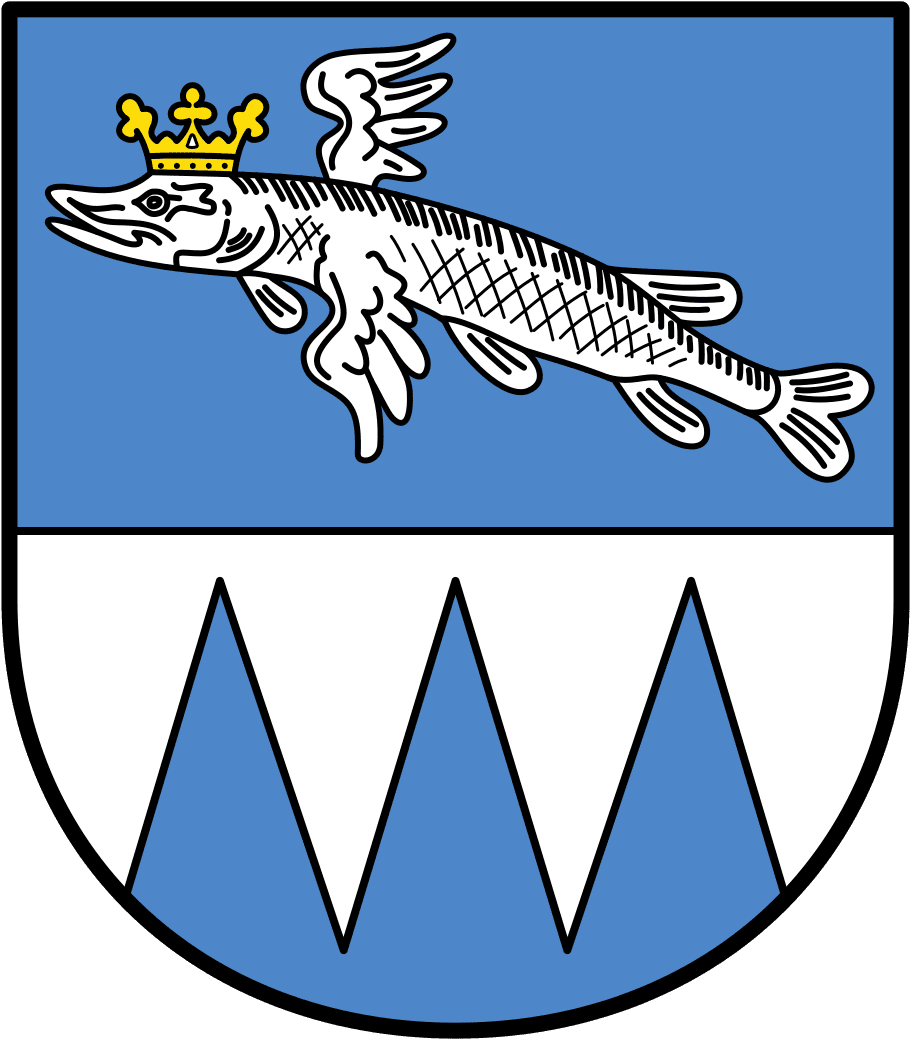
- Flag Coat of arms

- Location of Hechthausen within Cuxhaven district
- Interactive map of Hechthausen
- Location within Germany Location within Lower Saxony
- Coordinates: 53°39′N 09°14′E
- Country: Germany
- State: Lower Saxony
- District: Cuxhaven
- Municipal assoc.: Hemmoor

Area
  - Total: 30.73 km^{2} (11.86 sq mi)
- Elevation: 2 m (6.6 ft)

Population (2025-12-31)
  - Total: 3,631
  - Density: 118.2/km^{2} (306.0/sq mi)
- Time zone: UTC+01:00 (CET)
  - Summer (DST): UTC+02:00 (CEST)
- Postal codes: 21755
- Dialling codes: 04774
- Vehicle registration: CUX
- Website: www.hechthausen.de

Hechthausen (German pronunciation: [hɛçtˈhaʊzn̩]; Low German: Heckthusen) is a municipality in the district of Cuxhaven, in Lower Saxony, Germany.

== History ==
Hechthausen belonged to the Prince-Archbishopric of Bremen, established in 1180. In 1648 the Prince-Archbishopric was transformed into the Duchy of Bremen, which was first ruled in personal union by the Swedish Crown - interrupted by a Danish occupation (1712-1715) - and from 1715 on by the Hanoverian Crown. The Kingdom of Hanover incorporated the Duchy in a real union and the Ducal territory became part of the new Stade Region, established in 1823.

== Coat of arms ==
The upper part of the arms, which displays a silver pike, winged and crowned with gold, comes from the coat of arms of Pomeranian family of Hechthausen.

The lower part of the arms, which displays three blue peaks, comes from the coat of arms of the Bremenian family of Marschalck von Bachtenbrock.
