= Hemmoor (Samtgemeinde) =

- Samtgemeinde
- Coat of arms

- Location of Hemmoor within Cuxhaven district
- Interactive map of Hemmoor
- Location within Germany Location within Lower Saxony
- Coordinates: 53°42′N 9°7′E
- Country: Germany
- State: Lower Saxony
- District: Cuxhaven
- Founded: 1971
- Subdivisions: 3

Government
  - Mayor (2021–26): Jan Tiedemann (SPD)

Area
  - Total: 123.79 km^{2} (47.80 sq mi)

Population (2025-12-31)
  - Total: 14,106
  - Density: 113.95/km^{2} (295.13/sq mi)
- Time zone: UTC+01:00 (CET)
  - Summer (DST): UTC+02:00 (CEST)
- Website: www.samtgemeinde-hemmoor.de

Hemmoor is a Samtgemeinde ("collective municipality") in the district of Cuxhaven, in Lower Saxony, Germany. Its seat is in Hemmoor.

The Samtgemeinde Hemmoor consists of the following municipalities:

1. Hechthausen
2. Hemmoor
3. Osten
