= Aue (Oste) =

River in Germany

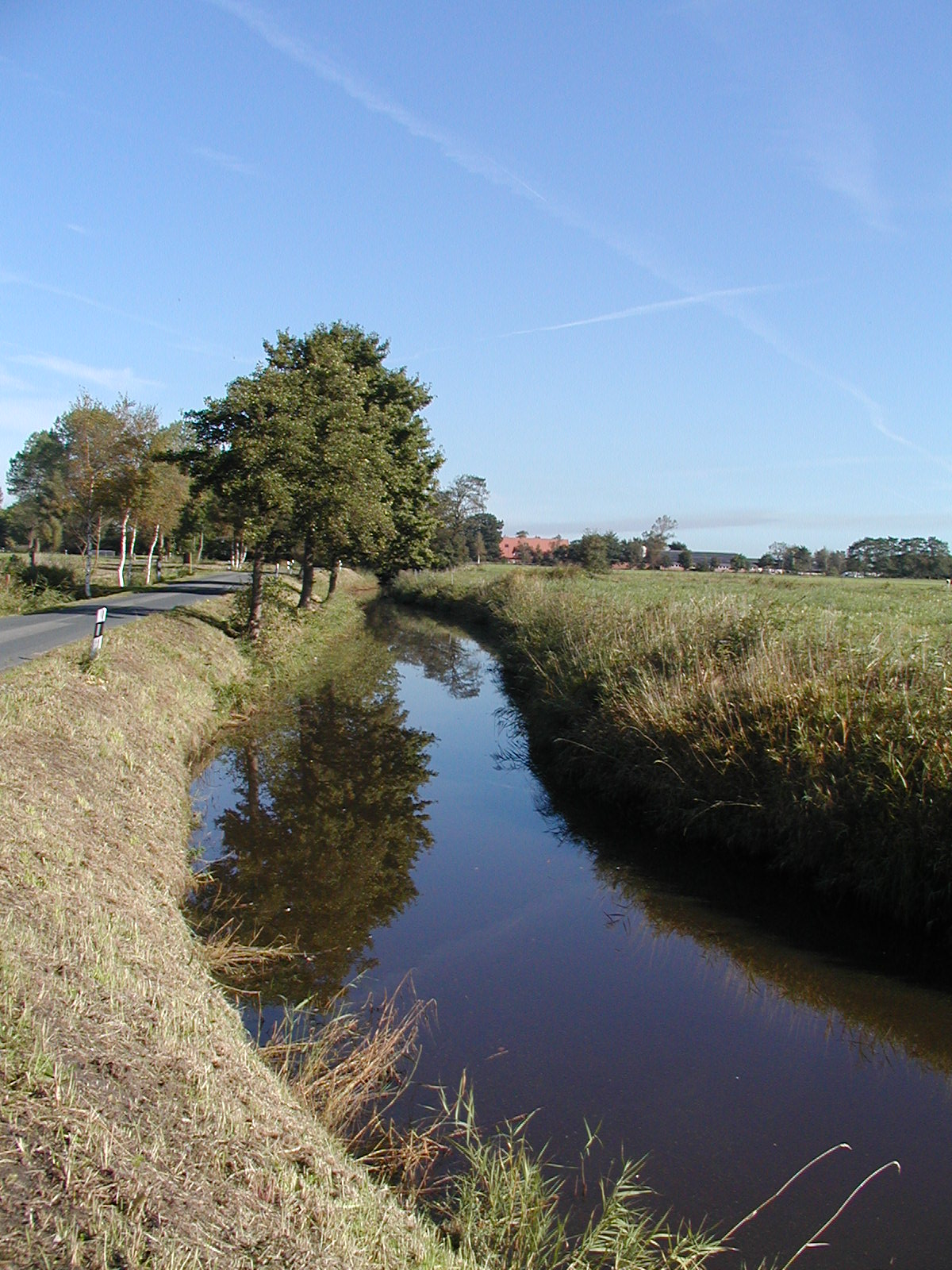
- The Aue in Bülkau

- Location of mouth in Lower Saxony

Location
- Country: Germany
- State: Lower Saxony
- District: Cuxhaven
- Reference no.: DE: 5988

Physical characteristics
- Source
  - location: Pumping station on the Balksee in the parish of Wingst
  - coordinates: 53°42′13″N 9°00′36″E
  - elevation: 3 m above sea level (NN)
- Mouth
  - location: Near Neuhaus (Oste) into the Oste
  - coordinates: 53°48′30″N 9°02′29″E
  - elevation: 1 m above sea level (NN)
- Length: 19.8 km (12.3 mi)
- Basin size: 122 km^{2} (47 sq mi)

Basin features
- Progression: Oste→ Elbe→ North Sea

The Aue (German pronunciation: [ˈaʊə]) is a left, southwestern, tributary of the Oste in northern Lower Saxony, Germany. It is about 20 kilometres (12 mi) long.

== Geography ==
Before the construction of the Neuhaus-Bülkau Canal the Aue was the natural outlet of the Balksee lake in the southwest part of the parish of Wingst on the southern edge of the collective municipality of Am Dobrock. The Balksee is, in turn, fed by several streams. The Aue today no longer has any direct link with the Balksee and rises on its northern edge. The Aue, as a former sea creek, has no natural gradient. The water level is artificially held below sea level by dyke sluices and a pumping station.

== Tributaries ==
- Rönne
- Neuhaus-Bülkau Canal (most of the water from the Balksee and the old drainage basin of the Aue flows through this canal)
- Sprengeauswettern
- Splethauswettern

== See also ==
- List of rivers of Lower Saxony
