= Hemmoor =

- Town
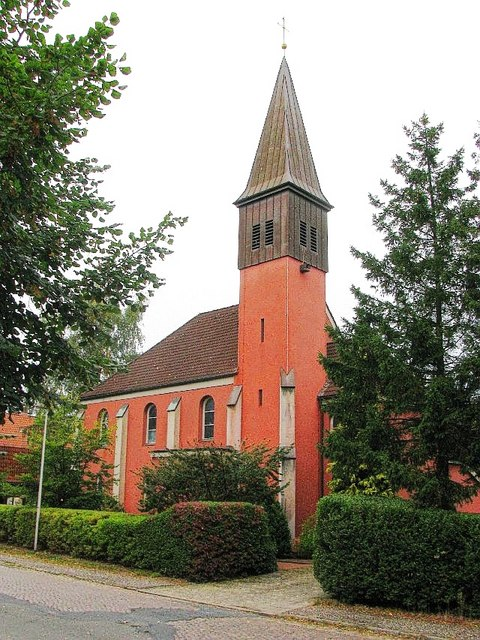
- Church of Saint Ansgar

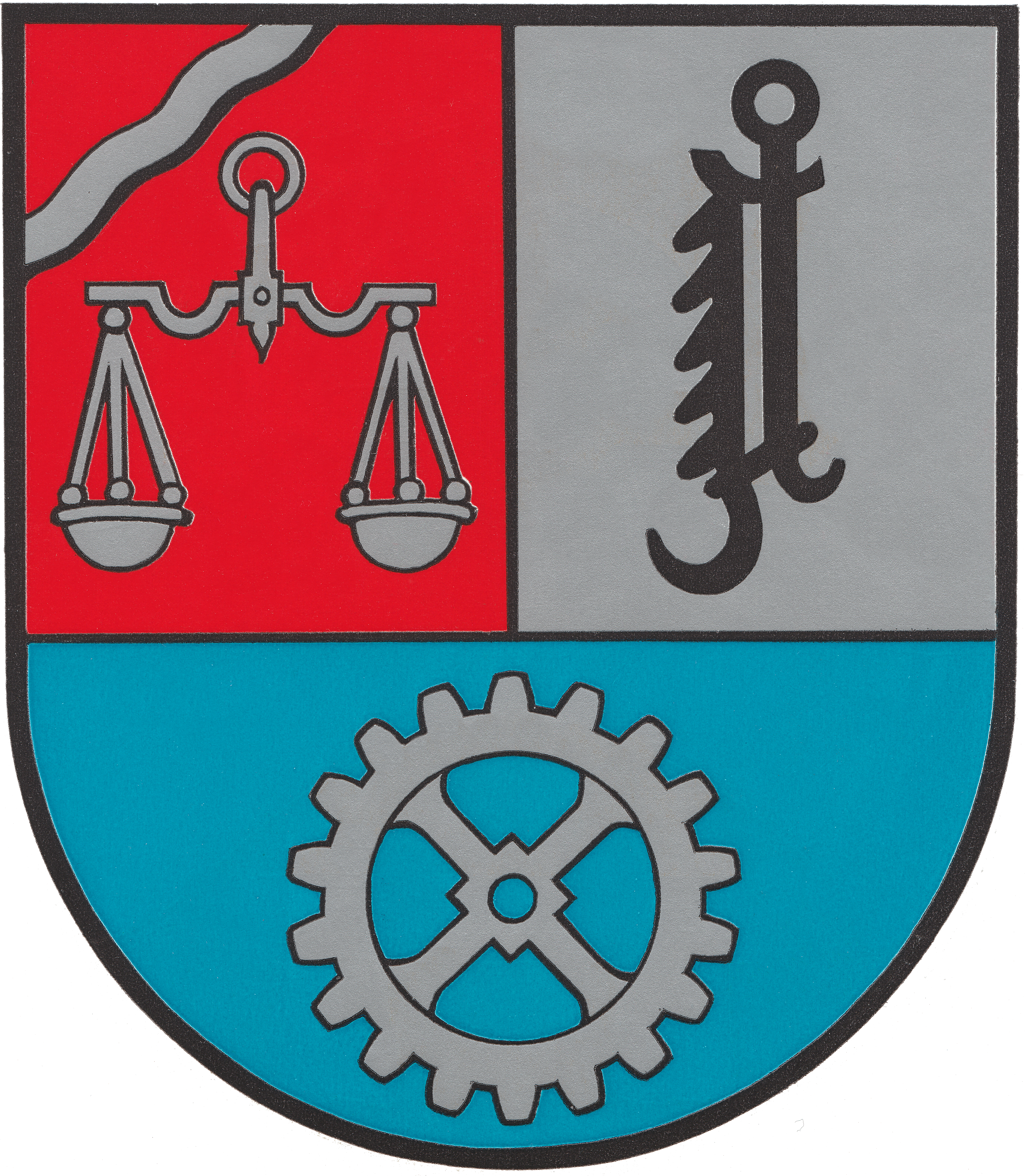
- Coat of arms

- Location of Hemmoor within Cuxhaven district
- Interactive map of Hemmoor
- Location within Germany Location within Lower Saxony
- Coordinates: 53°42′9″N 9°8′22″E
- Country: Germany
- State: Lower Saxony
- District: Cuxhaven
- Municipal assoc.: Hemmoor
- Subdivisions: 6 Ortschaften

Government
  - Mayor: Lasse Weritz (CDU)

Area
  - Total: 45.07 km^{2} (17.40 sq mi)
- Elevation: 5 m (16 ft)

Population (2025-12-31)
  - Total: 8,754
  - Density: 194.2/km^{2} (503.1/sq mi)
- Time zone: UTC+01:00 (CET)
  - Summer (DST): UTC+02:00 (CEST)
- Postal codes: 21745
- Dialling codes: 04771
- Vehicle registration: CUX
- Website: www.hemmoor.de

Hemmoor (German pronunciation: [ˈhɛmoːɐ̯]) is a small town in the district of Cuxhaven, in Lower Saxony, Germany. It is situated near the river Oste, approx. 40 km northeast of Bremerhaven, and 25 km south of Brunsbüttel.

== History ==
Hemmoor belonged to the Prince-Archbishopric of Bremen, established in 1180. In 1648 the Prince-Archbishopric was transformed into the Duchy of Bremen, which was first ruled in personal union by the Swedish Crown—interrupted by a Danish occupation (1712–1715)—and from 1715 on by the Hanoverian Crown. In 1807 the ephemeric Kingdom of Westphalia annexed the Duchy, before France annexed it in 1810. In 1813 the Duchy was restored to the Electorate of Hanover, which—after its upgrade to the Kingdom of Hanover in 1814—incorporated the Duchy in a real union and the Ducal territory, including Hemmoor, became part of the new Stade Region, established in 1823.

The Portland cement factory operating between 1866 and 1983 delivered concrete for the Statue of Liberty in the New York City.

== Other ==
Hemmoor is also the seat of the Samtgemeinde ("collective municipality") Hemmoor.

It is twinned with the small market town of Swaffham, which is situated in the east of England.
