= Sky Ride =

- Coordinates: 41.860916°N 87.611525°W
- Carries: fairgoers in suspended 36 passenger cars
- Crosses: Century of Progress exhibition grounds, downtown Chicago
- Locale: Chicago, Illinois
- Official name: Century of Progress Exhibition Sky-Ride

Characteristics
- Design: Transporter Bridge
- Total length: 3200 ft (975 m) including 2 600 ft (182 m) backstays
- Longest span: 1,850 ft (560 m) (some sources say 2000 ft)
- Clearance above: 628 ft (191 m) high towers
- Clearance below: 190 ft (58 m) above fairgrounds

History
- Opened: February 2, 1933
- Closed: November 1934

Location
- Interactive map of

The Sky Ride was an attraction built for the Century of Progress, the 1933 world's fair in Chicago, Illinois. It was a transporter bridge (with a design similar to an aerial tramway or gondola lift), designed by the bridge engineering firm Robinson & Steinman, that ferried people across the lagoon, Burnham Harbor, in the center of the fair. It was located near Northerly Island, but was demolished after the Fair, having carried 4.5 million passengers. The Sky Ride had a 1,850-foot (560 m) span and two 628-foot (191 m) tall towers, making it the most prominent structure at the fair. Suspended from the span, 215 feet (66 m) above the ground, were rocket-shaped cars, each carrying 36 passengers.

== History ==
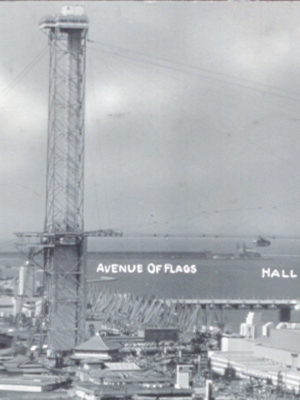
Closeup of inland tower, showing 200 ft landing and observation deck at top. A "rocket car" is visible at right

The Century of Progress Exposition committee sought an exciting signature attraction, one that would be remembered like the Eiffel Tower, from the 1889 Paris World's Fair, or the Ferris wheel of the 1893 Chicago World's Fair. One proposal under consideration, to be underwritten by Montgomery Ward, was called the Tower of Water and Light—a 250-foot-tall tower with water flowing down the outside and elevators traveling to observation platforms. When the Montgomery Ward company backed out of its offer to finance the tower, the commission considered the Sky Ride.

The Sky Ride, an idea suggested by an engineer named William L. Hamilton, would span the grounds and be relatively cheap to build. The ride was built in the span of six months prior to the fair's opening, by a consortium of five companies: Great Lakes Dredge and Dock Company, Inland Steel Company, John Roebling and Sons, Mississippi Valley Structural Steel and Otis Elevator at a cost of about $1 million.

The ride had a capacity of 5,000 people per hour. It was reported that the attraction had 2,616,389 riders in 1933 and a total of about 4.5 million during the course of the fair. At the time of construction the span between towers was one of the longest in the world, allegedly exceeded in span only by the George Washington Bridge, and the towers were higher than any of the skyscrapers in Chicago. It was reported that it contained 2,000 tons of steel, 100 miles (160 km) of cabling and that the cableway had a breaking strength of 220,000 pounds per square inch.

The Sky Ride was demolished at the conclusion of the fair. The west tower was brought down using 120 pounds of dynamite. The east tower was toppled on August 29, 1935, using 1,500 pounds of thermite charges to melt ten-foot sections near the bottom of two of the legs. When the thermite was fired, the two legs collapsed and the tower fell on its side.

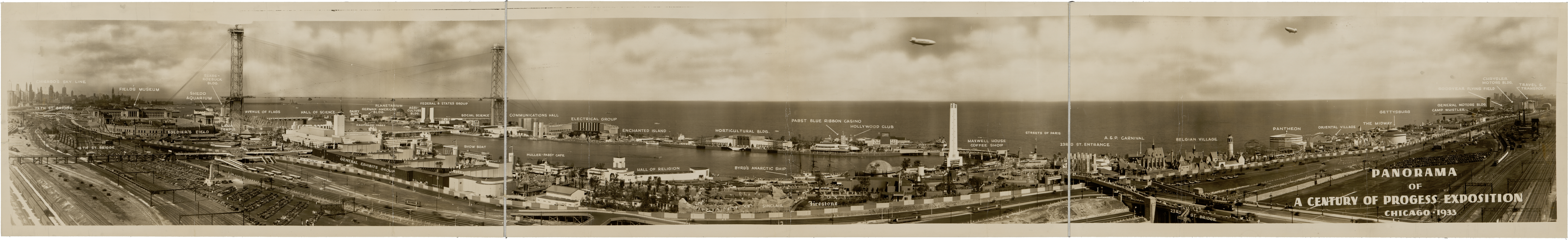
Panorama, showing Sky Ride to the left

== Design ==
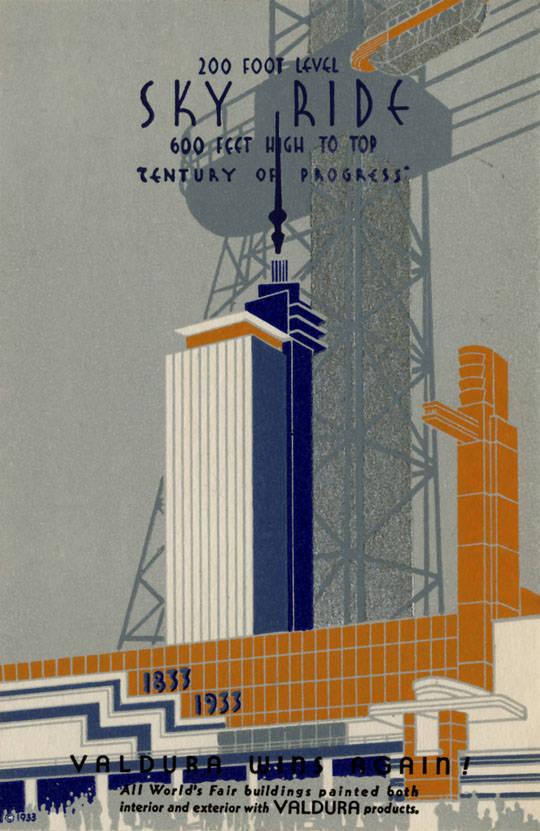
Sky Ride postcard

The Sky Ride consisted of two towers, each 628 feet (191 m) high, spaced 1,850 feet (560 m) apart. Each tower had four elevators with a 30-person capacity. Fair goers could take a trip across from one tower to the other at the 200-foot (61 m) level, or take the elevator farther up to the observation decks at the top of the tower. There were two decks per tower and Bausch and Lomb supplied the 12 coin-operated telescopes on the tower observation decks. If they chose to take a trip across, they rode in one of 12 double-decked "rocket cars" carried across from one tower to the other. Each car emitted steam intended to resemble a "tail" or rocket exhaust, as it traveled across the wires. At night, lights were focused on the cars as they traveled between the towers, and lights were also attached to the bottom of the elevators.

The transporter bridge is more common in Europe. In the United States, only two transporter bridges were ever built: the Aerial Lift Bridge in Duluth, Minnesota in 1905, and the Sky Ride. Due to capacity constraints, the Duluth bridge was converted from a transporter bridge to a more conventional vertical lift bridge with a raisable through truss span in 1930. Thus, the count of transporter bridges existing at a given time in the US never exceeded 1, and after November 1934, stands at zero again.

== Brochure ==
The following brochure text gives a feel for the dramatic prose of the day.

Two towers stand like giant sentinels, 1,850 feet (560 m) apart, seeming to guard the Hall of Science on the Mainland, and the Hall of Social Science across the Lagoon—support of the spectacular Sky-Ride, great thrill feature of A Century of Progress. Back in 1893, it was the monster Ferris Wheel that everybody talked about, and everybody rode. Today, striking example of the progress of science even in thrill makers, is this suspension bridge principle applied to an entertainment feature—and perhaps the near solution of some problems of overhead transportation.

They are higher than any building in Chicago, these two strong steel towers, imbedded in cement. Six hundred and twenty-eight feet they rise into the skies, with observation floors atop them. On a 200-foot (61 m) level the rocket cars offer you a beautiful and, mayhap, thrilling ride across the lagoon.

== See also ==
- Lattice tower
- Aerial tramway
- Transporter bridge
