= Aerial Lift Bridge =

Bridge in Duluth, Minnesota

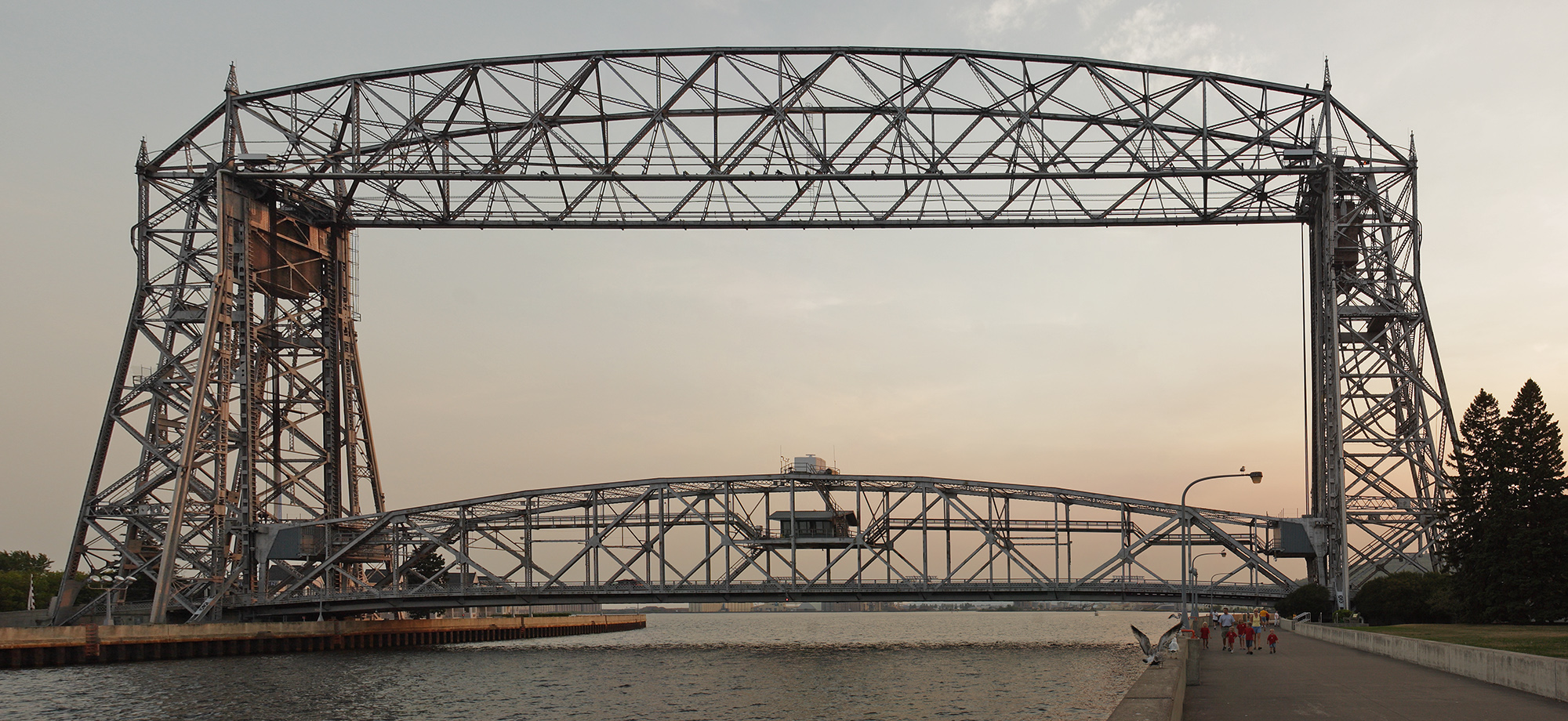
- The Aerial Lift Bridge in Duluth, MN
- Coordinates: 46.7790°N 92.0929°W
- Carries: Lake Avenue
- Crosses: Duluth Ship Canal
- Locale: Duluth, Minnesota
- Owner: City of Duluth
- Maintained by: City of Duluth
- ID number: L6116

Characteristics
- Design: Steel Movable - Lift
- Total length: 152.9 metres (502 ft)
- Width: 7.3 metres (24 ft)
- Longest span: 117.6 metres (386 ft)
- Clearance above: 5.49 metres (18.0 ft)

History
- Opened: 1905

Statistics
- Daily traffic: 6143
- Aerial Lift Bridge
- U.S. National Register of Historic Places
- Location within Minnesota Location within the United States
- Location: Lake Avenue, Duluth, Minn.
- Built: 1905, reconstructed in 1929
- Architects: Thomas F. McGilvray; C.A.P. Turner
- NRHP reference No.: 73002174
- Added to NRHP: May 22, 1973

Location
- Interactive map of Aerial Lift Bridge

The Aerial Lift Bridge, earlier known as the Aerial Bridge or Aerial Ferry Bridge, is a landmark in the port city of Duluth, Minnesota. The span began life in 1905 as the United States' first transporter bridge; only one other was ever constructed in the country, the Sky Ride in Chicago. The span was converted in 1929–1930 to a vertical-lift bridge, also rather uncommon, although there are six such bridges along Ontario's Welland Canal. It remains in operation, owned and operated by the City of Duluth. The bridge was added to the National Register of Historic Places on May 22, 1973. The United States Army Corps of Engineers maintains a nearby maritime museum.

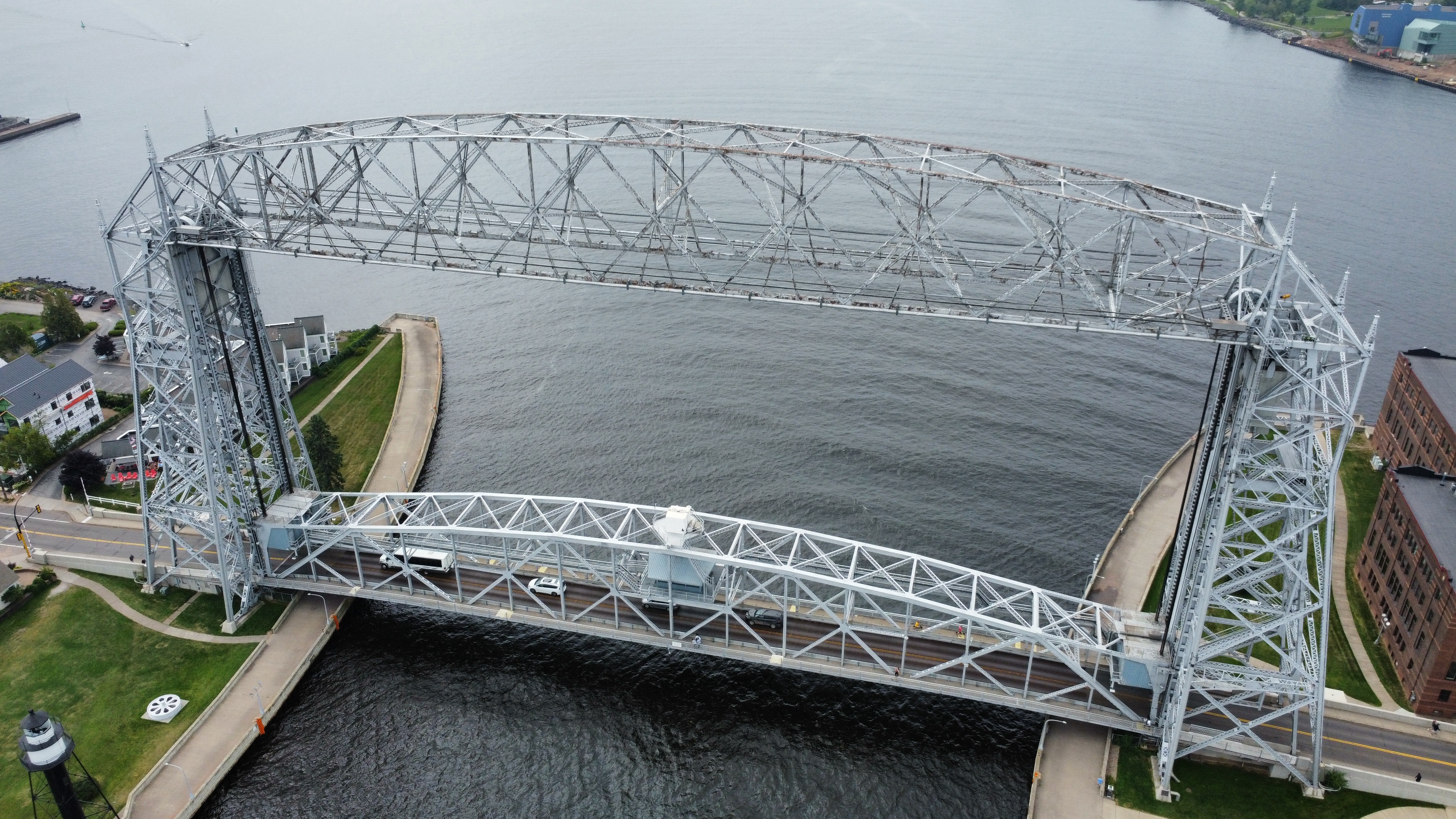
Duluth Aerial Lift Bridge in 2024

== History ==
The bridge spans the Duluth Ship Canal, which was put through the miles-long sand spit named Minnesota Point – commonly called Park Point by locals – in 1870–1871. The natural mouth of the Saint Louis River is about seven miles (11 km) farther southeast, and is split between Minnesota and Wisconsin. Creating this gap in the sand spit meant that residents who lived on the new island needed to have a way to get across. Several transportation methods were tried, though they were complicated by the weather. Ferries could work in the summer, but ice caused problems in colder months. A swinging footbridge was used, but was considered rather rickety and unsafe.

In 1892, a contest was held to find a solution. The winning design came from John Low Waddell, who drew up plans for a high-rise vertical lift bridge. The city of Duluth was eager to build the bridge, which would have been about 130 feet (40 m) wide. However, the War Department objected to the design, and the project was canceled before it could be built. Waddell's design went on to be built in Chicago, Illinois, as the slightly larger South Halsted Street Bridge, which was removed in 1932.

New plans were later drawn up for a structure that would ferry people from one side to the other. This type of span, known variously as an aerial transfer, ferry, or transporter bridge, was first demonstrated in Bilbao's Vizcaya Bridge in 1893 and in France in 1898. Duluth's bridge was inspired by the one in France, though the actual construction is quite different. The architect was a city engineer, Thomas McGilvray.

When it was completed in 1905, the Aerial Bridge's gondola had a capacity of 60 short tons (54 tonnes) and could carry 350 people plus wagons, streetcars, or automobiles. A trip across the canal took about one minute, and the ferry car moved across once every five minutes during busy times of the day. A growing population on Minnesota Point, a greater demand for cars, and an increase in tourism soon meant that the bridge's capacity was being stretched to the limit.

A remodeling was planned that would remove the gondola and incorporate a lifting platform into the structure. The firm finally commissioned to design the new bridge was the descendant of Waddell's company. The new design, which closely resembles the 1892 concept, is attributed to C.A.P. Turner. Reconstruction began in 1929. To ensure that tall ships could still pass under the bridge, the top span had to be raised to accommodate the new deck when raised. The support columns on either side were also modified so that they could hold new counterweights to balance the weight of the lifting portion. The new bridge was first lifted for a vessel, the U.S. Army Corps of Engineers tugboat Essayons, on March 29, 1930.

The bridge can be raised to its full height of 135 feet (41 meters) in about a minute, and is raised about 5,000 times per year. The span is about 390 feet (120 meters). As ships pass, there is a customary horn-blowing sequence that is copied back. The bridge's "horn" is made up of two Westinghouse Airbrake locomotive horns. Long-short-short is known as the Captain's Salute and is the most common of the ship signal exchanges. On November 10, the anniversary of the sinking of the SS Edmund Fitzgerald with all hands in Lake Superior, the Lift Bridge exchanges a special salute with the SS Arthur M. Anderson as it comes into Duluth Harbor. The salute is given in honor of the Fitzgerald and her crew; the Anderson was the last lake freighter to have contact with the Fitzgerald before it went down, and was the first vessel on scene to search in vain for survivors. The exchange is known as the Master Salute, consisting of the horn sequence of long-long-long-short-short.

The bridge was designated as a National Historic Civil Engineering Landmark by the American Society of Civil Engineers in 2017.

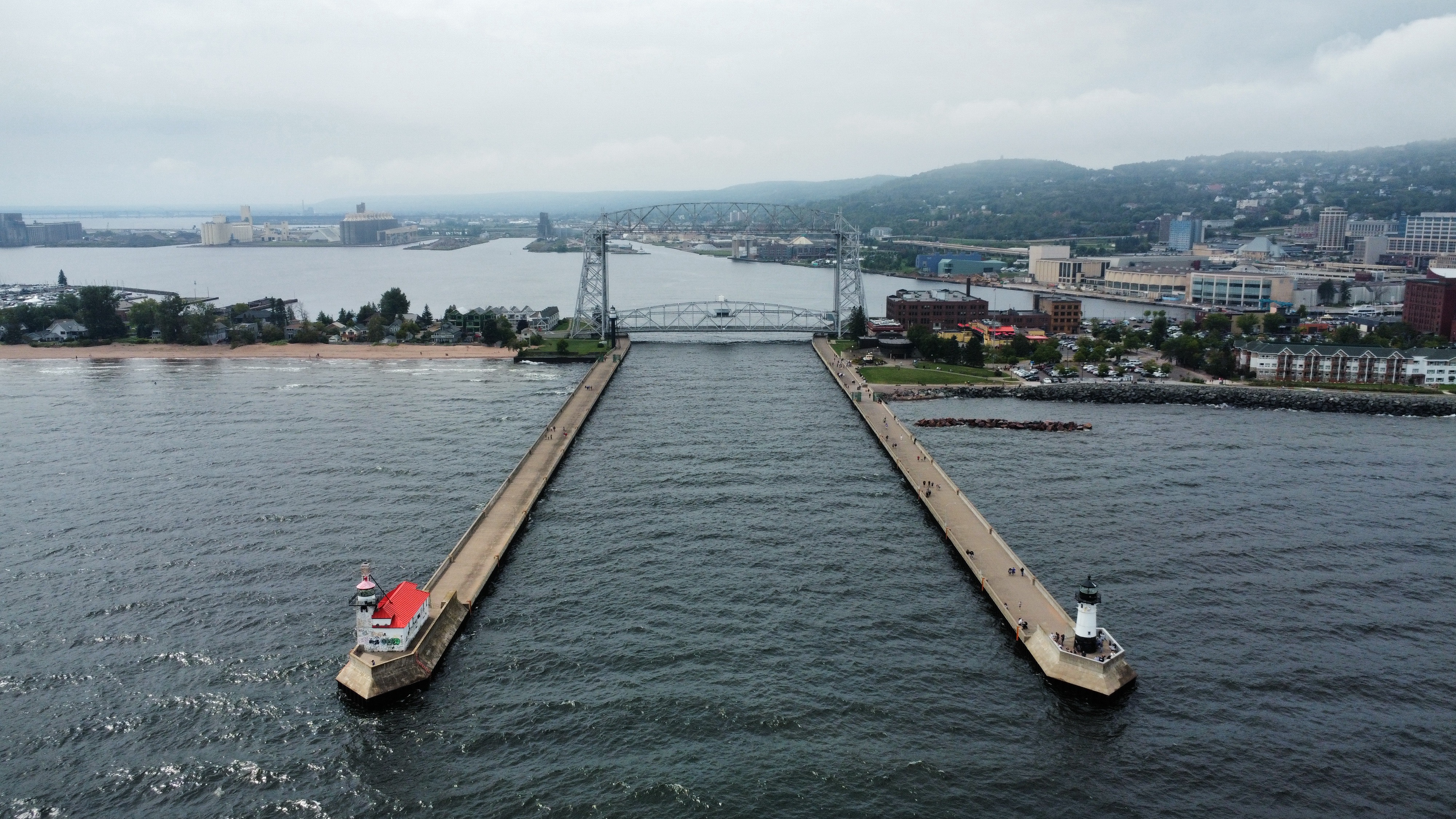

== Gallery ==
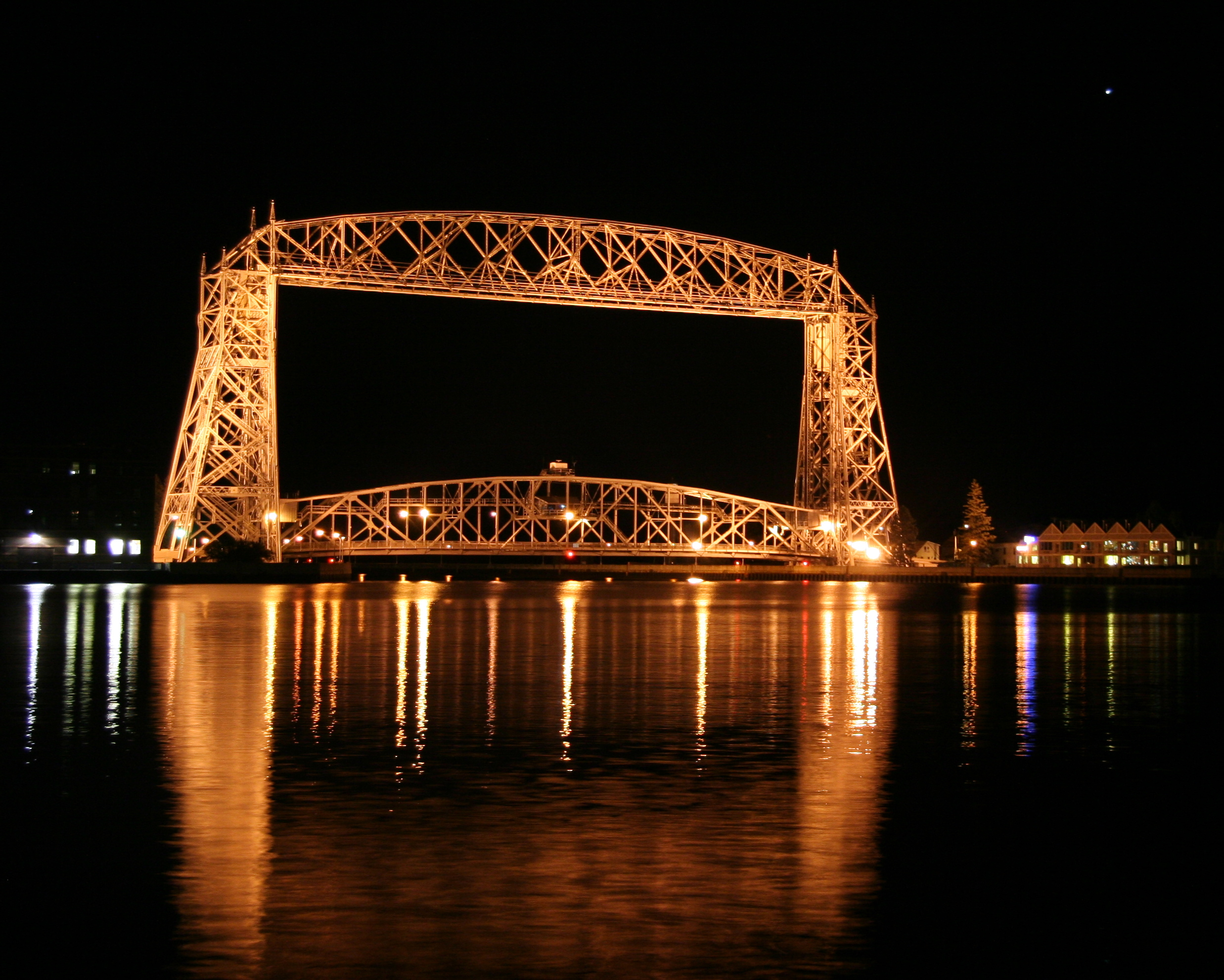
Aerial lift bridge at night, 2010

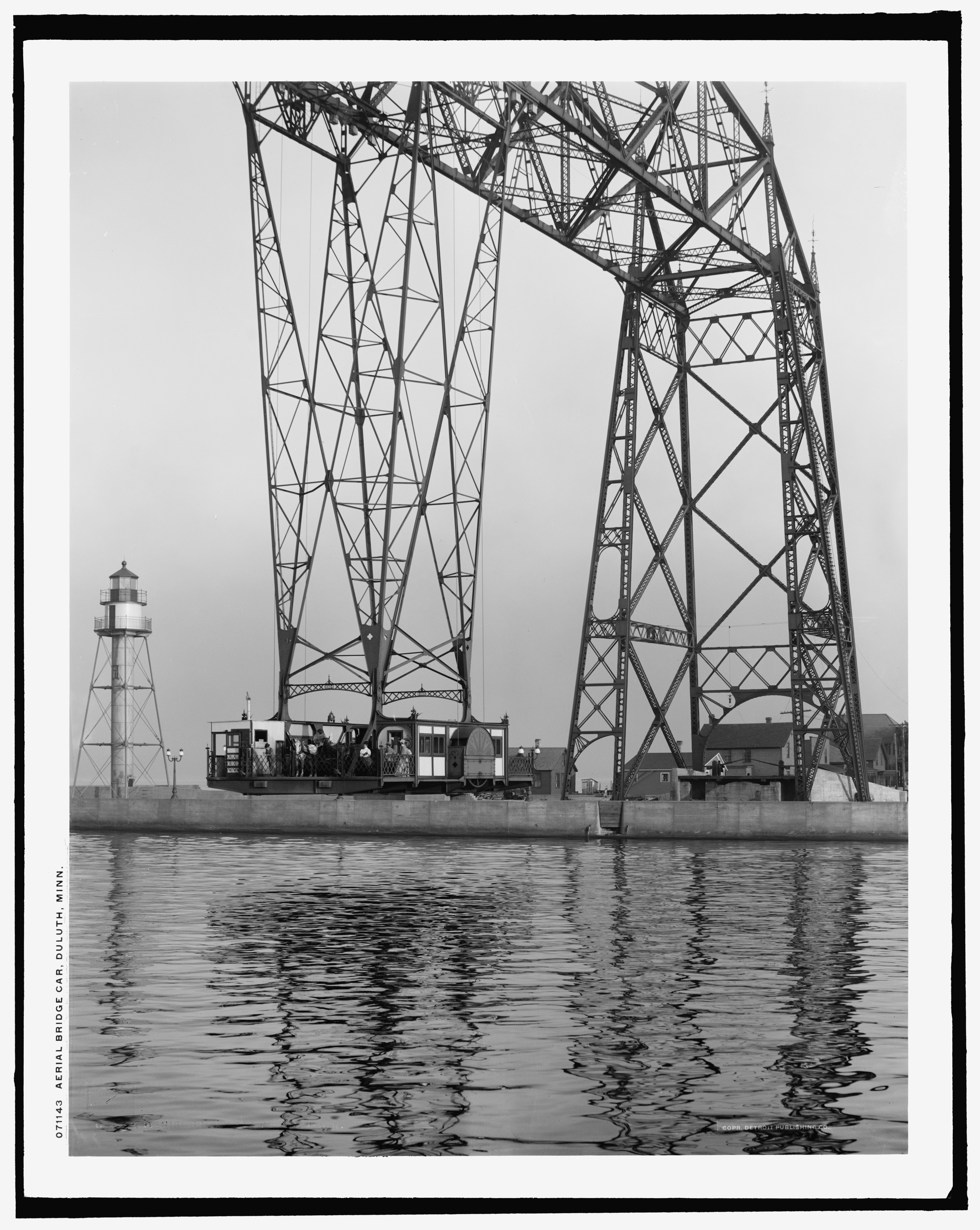
Aerial gondola, c. 1908

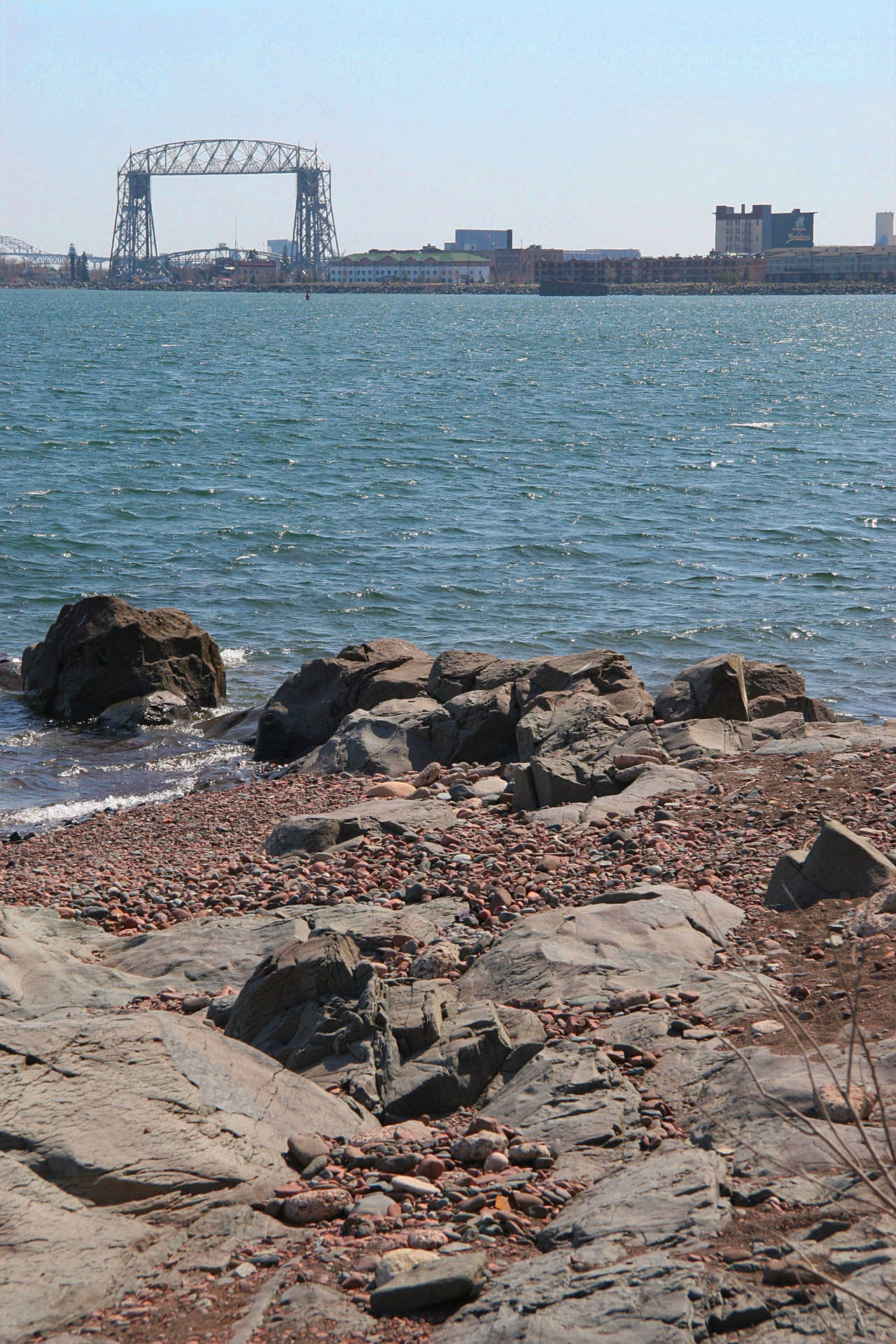
The bridge dominates the Canal Park skyline. (2005)

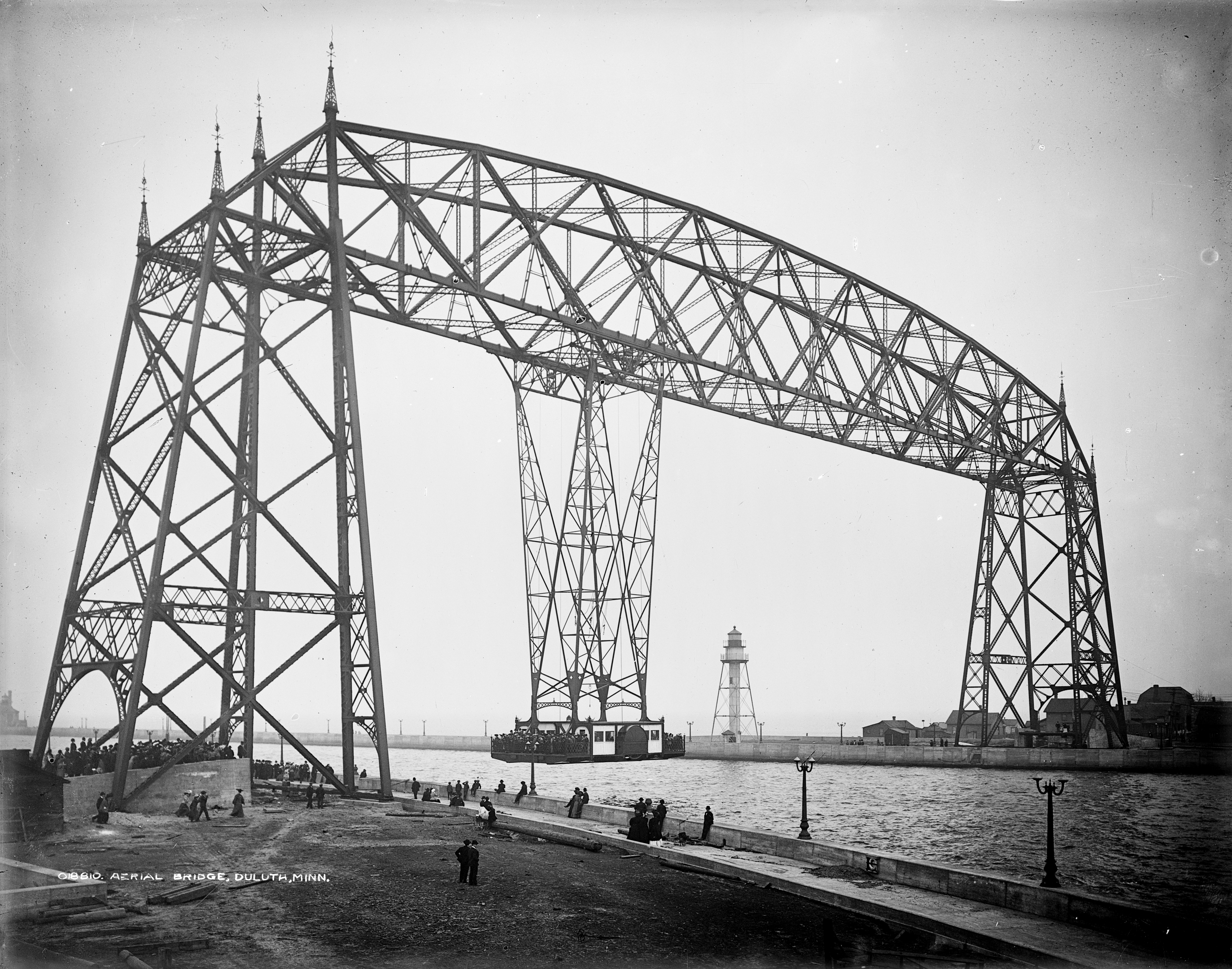
The Aerial Bridge in 1905

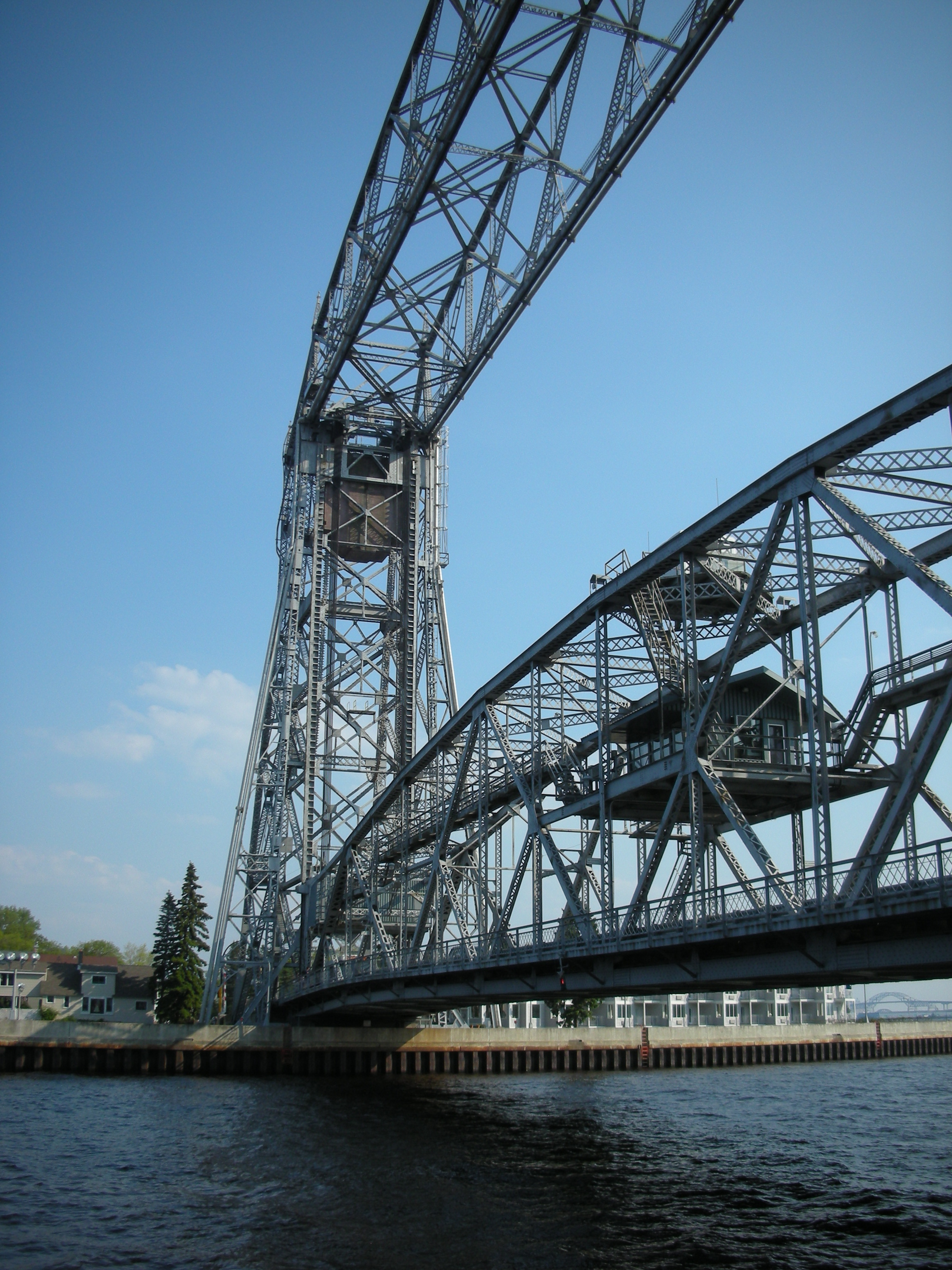
The bridge in 2007

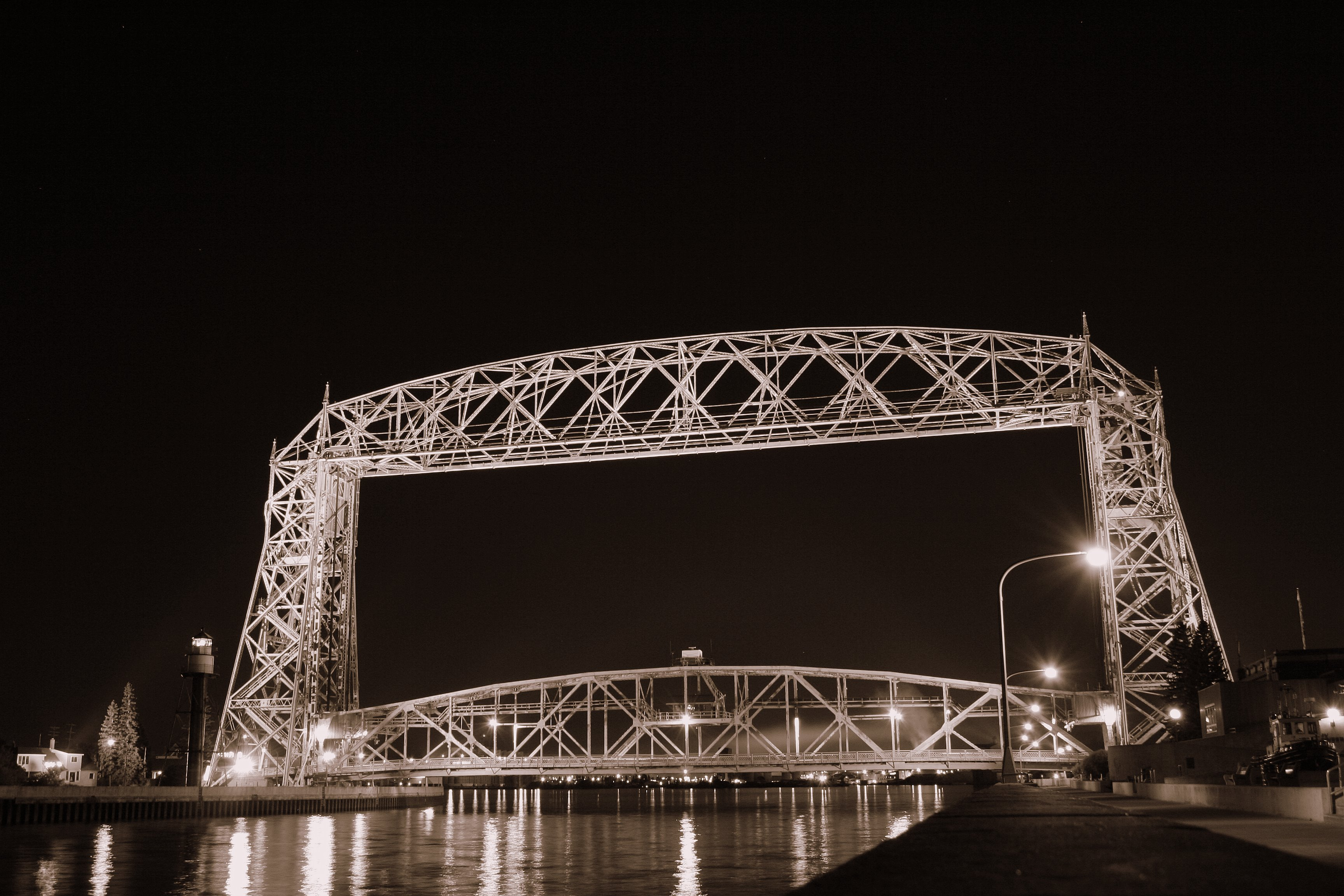
The Aerial Lift Bridge at Night (2007)

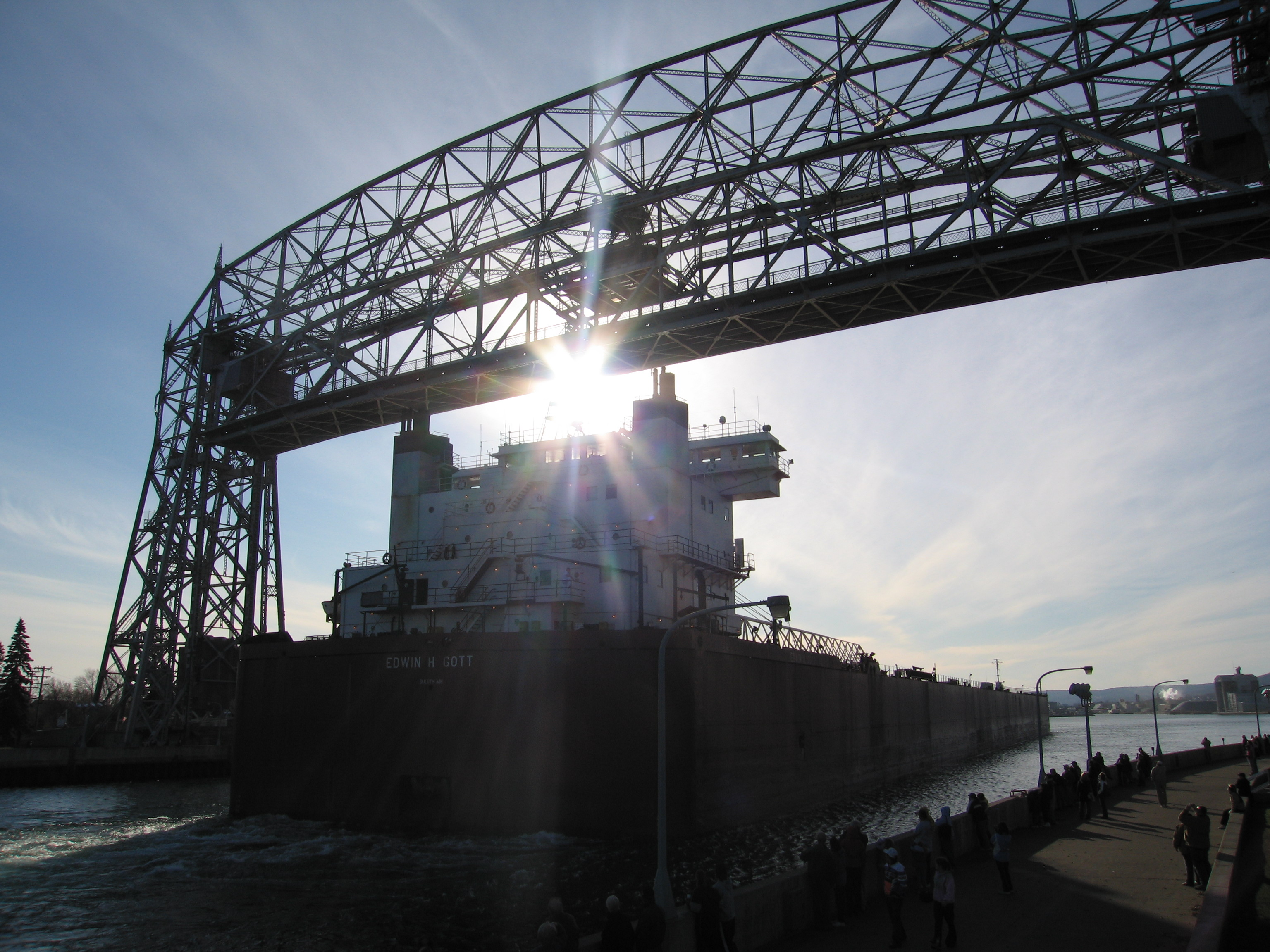
MV Edwin H. Gott under the Aerial Lift Bridge

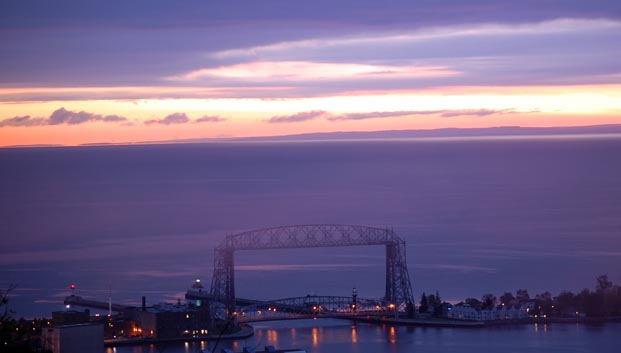
Sunrise over the Aerial Lift Bridge

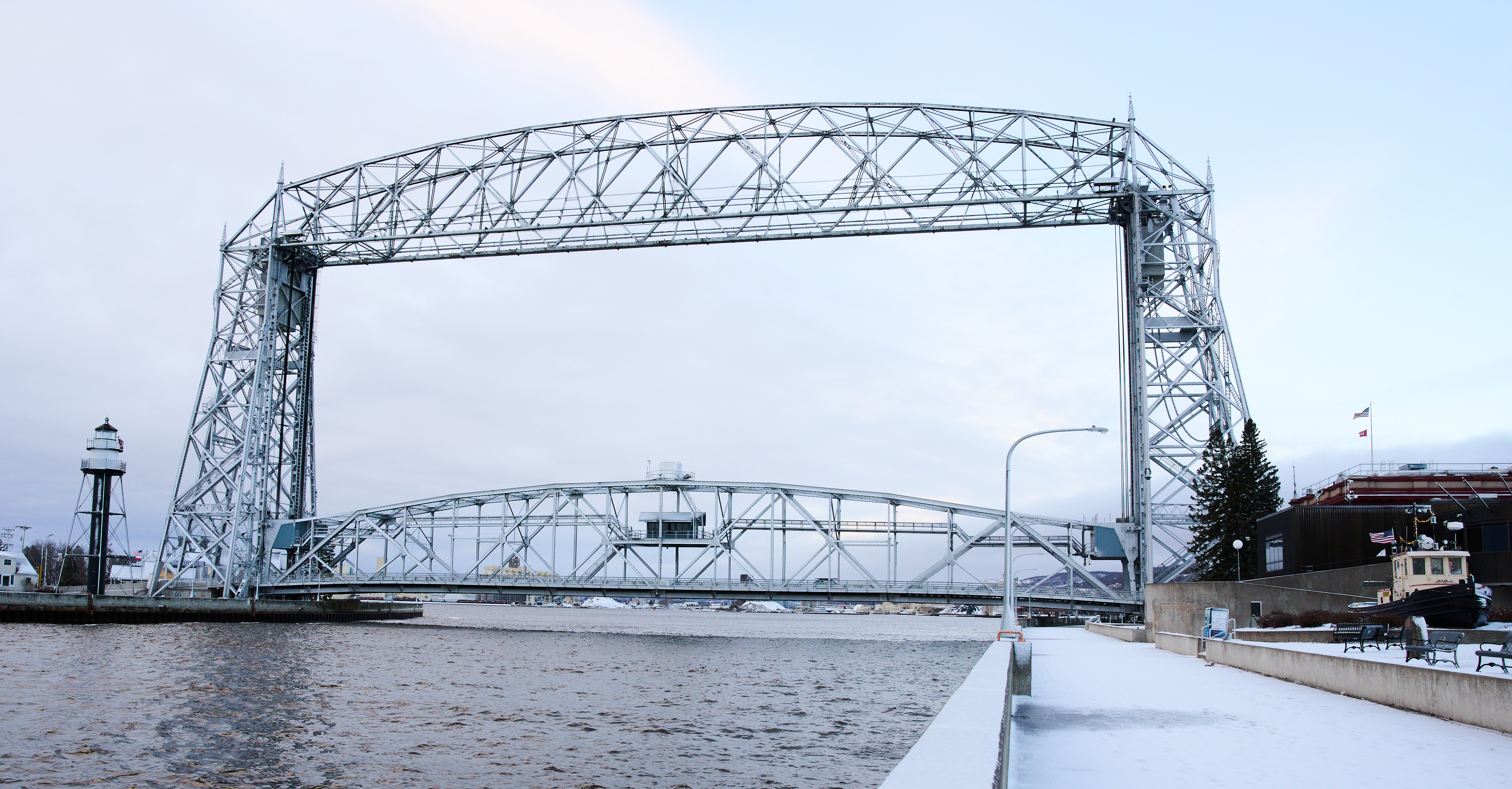
The Aerial Lift Bridge in Duluth, MN as seen on 31 December 2023

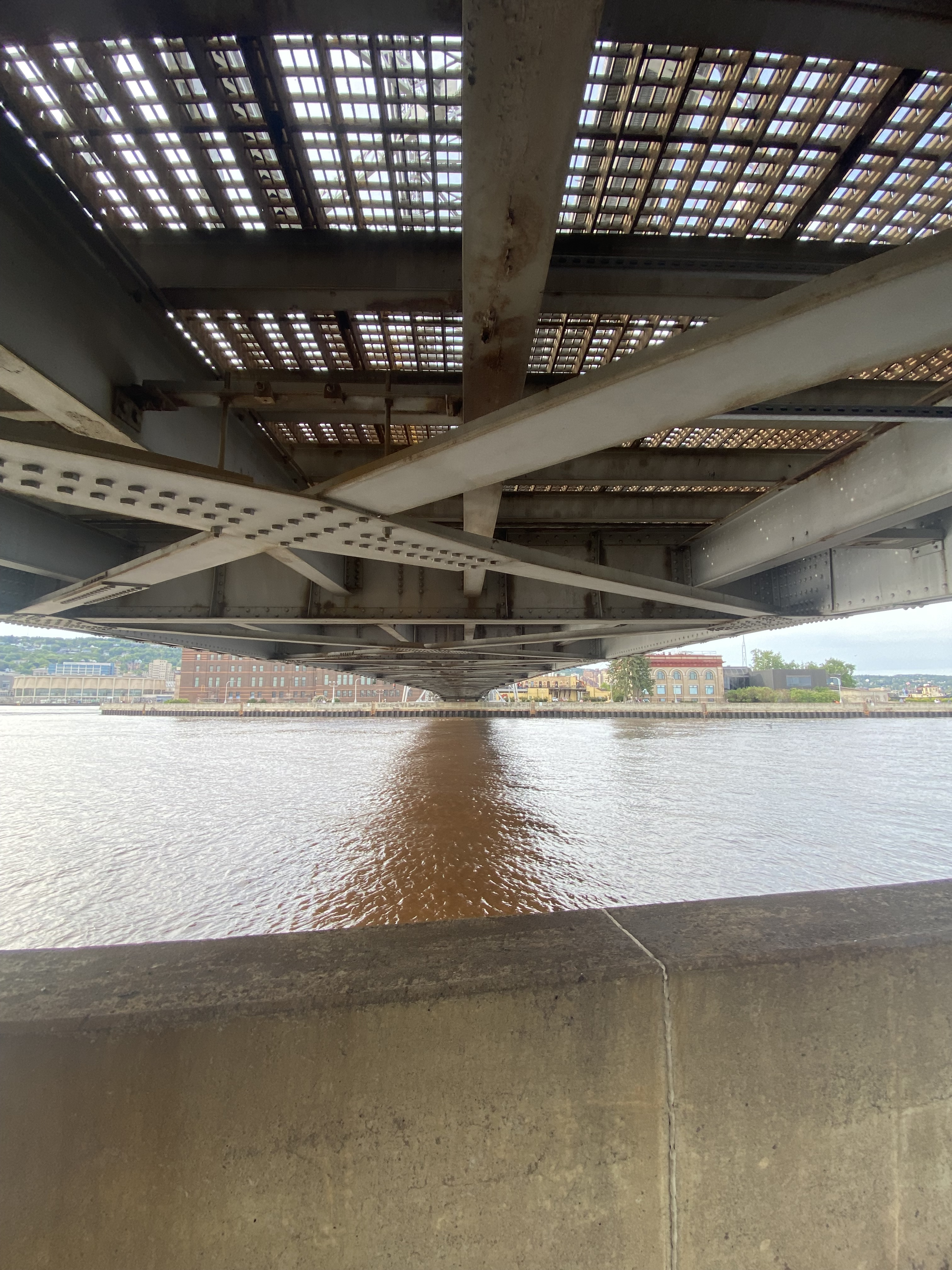
Underside of the lowered Aerial Lift Bridge (2024)

== See also ==
- List of bridges documented by the Historic American Engineering Record in Minnesota
- Tees Newport Bridge
- John A. Blatnik Bridge – the nearby Interstate 535 crossing in Duluth–Superior
- Richard I. Bong Memorial Bridge – the nearby U.S. Route 2 crossing
- Stillwater Bridge (St. Croix River) – another lift bridge in Minnesota, connecting to Wisconsin
