= Erlebnisbrücke =

Coordinates: 51°14′17″N 6°28′28″E

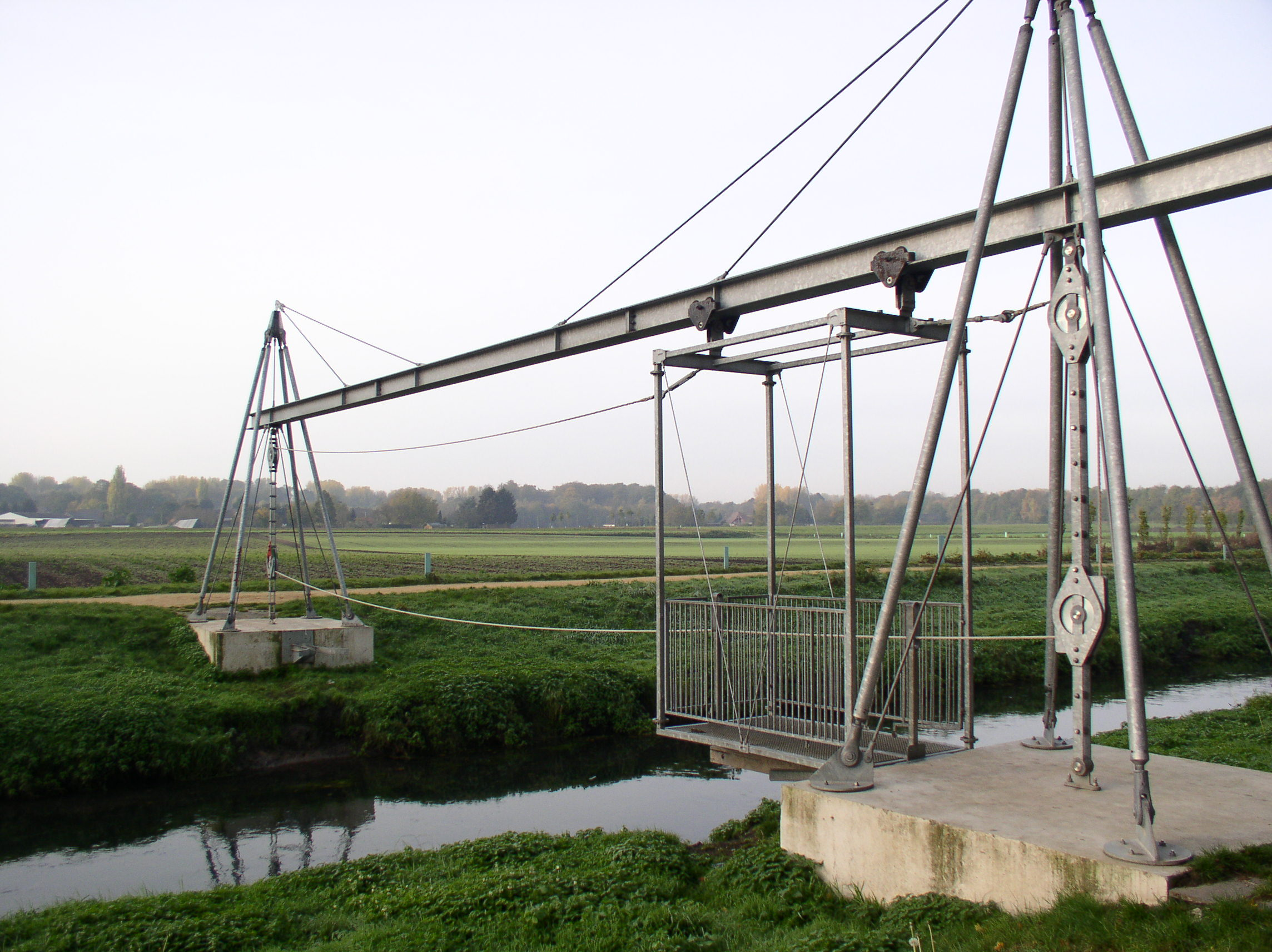
Erlebnisbrücke Nordkanal

The Erlebnisbrücke Nordkanal —or Euroga-Erlebnisbrücke—is a manually operated suspension ferry for passengers and bicycles crossing the Niers (Neue Niers) waterway between the villages of Cloerbruch and Donk, in the northeastern part of the municipality of Mönchengladbach, North Rhine-Westphalia, Germany.

The Erlebnisbrücke Nordkanal was built in 2003 as part of the Landesgartenschau (Regional Garden Show) Euroga 2002/2003, a decentralized event held that year in the state of North Rhine-Westphalia.

The suspension ferry is part of the Fietsallee am Nordkanal tourist cycle route and EuroVelo 4 (the "Central Europe Route" between Roscoff and Kyiv) within the European cycle route network.

The gondola measures 2.5 metres (8.2 ft) by 1.5 metres (4.9 ft). The pylons are 6.3 metres (21 ft) high, and the ferry has a span of 24.3 metres (80 ft).

The ferry is unmanned and free to use.

== See also ==
- List of bridges in Germany
