= Osten =

Osten Oosten (Low German)
- Municipality
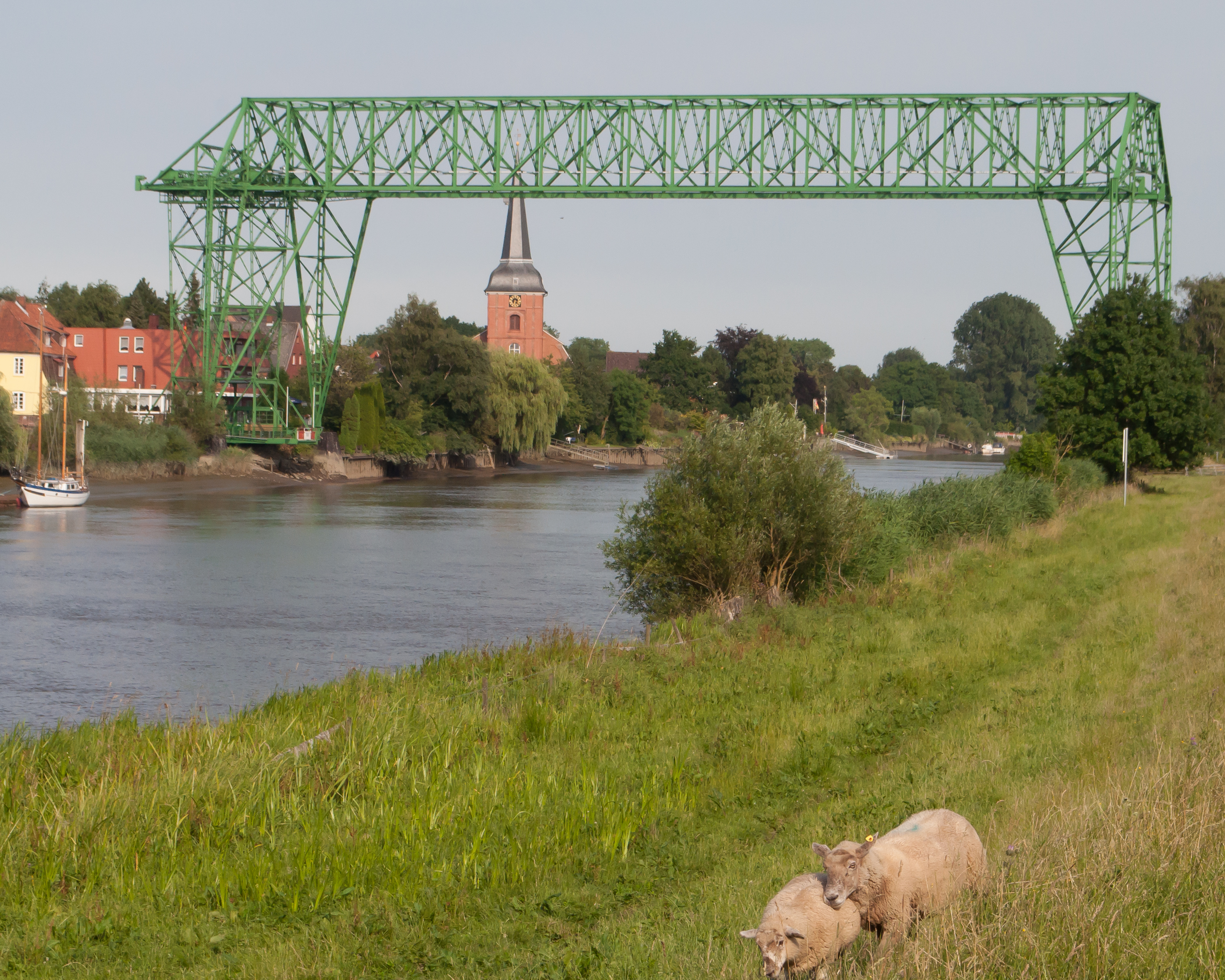
- Osten Transporter Bridge over the Oste with St. Peter's Church

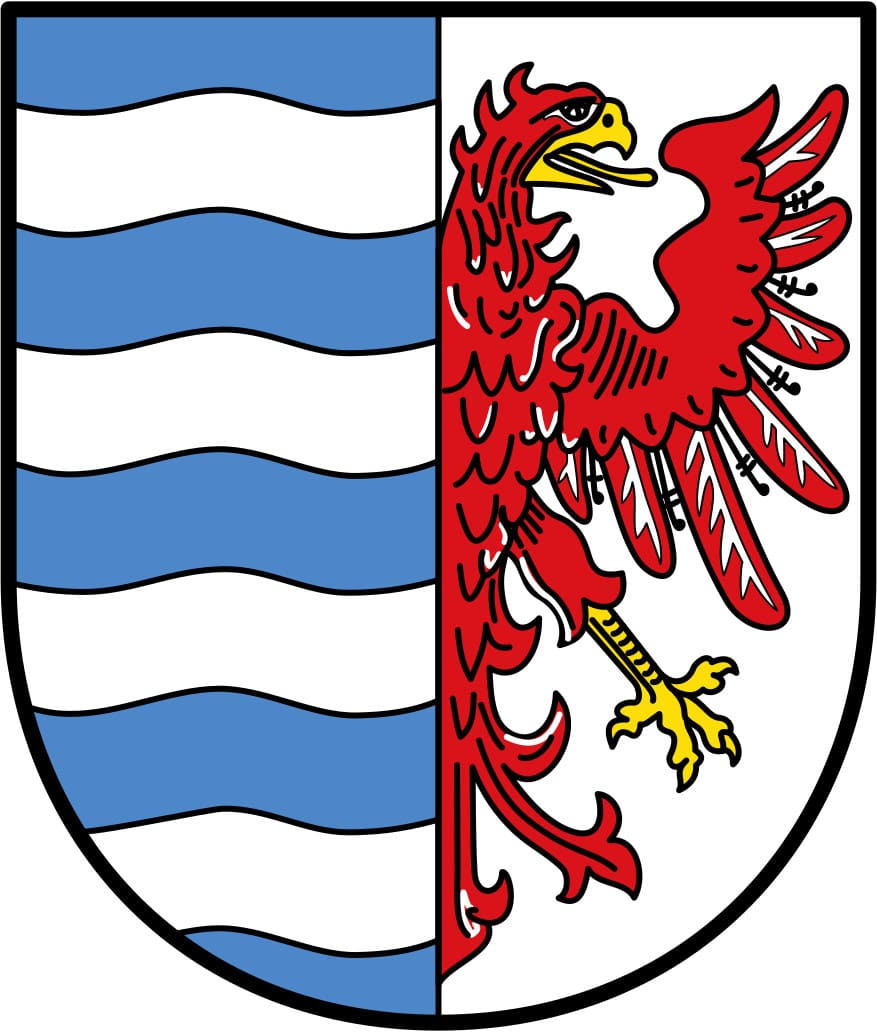
- Flag Coat of arms

- Location of Osten within Cuxhaven district
- Interactive map of Osten
- Location within Germany Location within Lower Saxony
- Coordinates: 53°41′49″N 09°11′23″E
- Country: Germany
- State: Lower Saxony
- District: Cuxhaven
- Municipal assoc.: Hemmoor
- Subdivisions: 3 Ortsteile

Government
  - Mayor: Carsten Hubert (CDU)

Area
  - Total: 47.99 km^{2} (18.53 sq mi)
- Elevation: 1 m (3.3 ft)

Population (2025-12-31)
  - Total: 1,721
  - Density: 35.86/km^{2} (92.88/sq mi)
- Time zone: UTC+01:00 (CET)
  - Summer (DST): UTC+02:00 (CEST)
- Postal codes: 21756
- Dialling codes: 04771, 04776
- Vehicle registration: CUX
- Website: www.hemmoor.de

Osten (German: [ˈoːstn̩]; Northern Low Saxon: Oosten) is a municipality in the district of Cuxhaven, in Lower Saxony, Germany. It is situated on the river Oste. Osten also means "East" in German.

== History ==
Osten belonged to the Prince-Archbishopric of Bremen, established in 1180. In 1648 the Prince-Archbishopric was transformed into the Duchy of Bremen, which was first ruled in personal union by the Swedish Crown - interrupted by a Danish occupation (1712–1715) - and from 1715 on by the Hanoverian Crown. The Kingdom of Hanover incorporated the Duchy in a real union and the Ducal territory became part of the new Stade Region, established in 1823.
