= Oste =

River in Lower Saxony, Germany

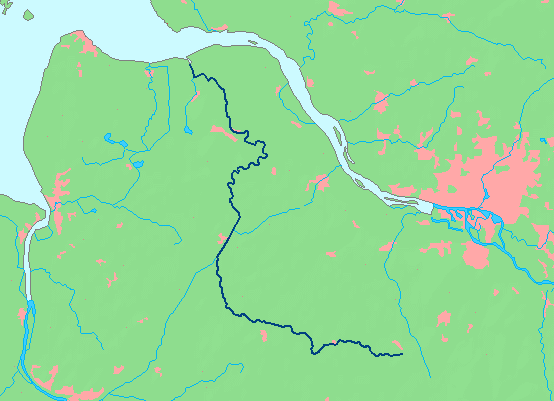

Location
- Country: Germany
- State: Lower Saxony

Physical characteristics
- Source
  - elevation: 31 m (102 ft)
- Mouth
  - location: Elbe
  - coordinates: 53°50′22″N 9°1′6″E
- Length: 156.0 km (96.9 mi)
- Basin size: 1,715 km^{2} (662 sq mi)

Basin features
- Progression: Elbe→ North Sea

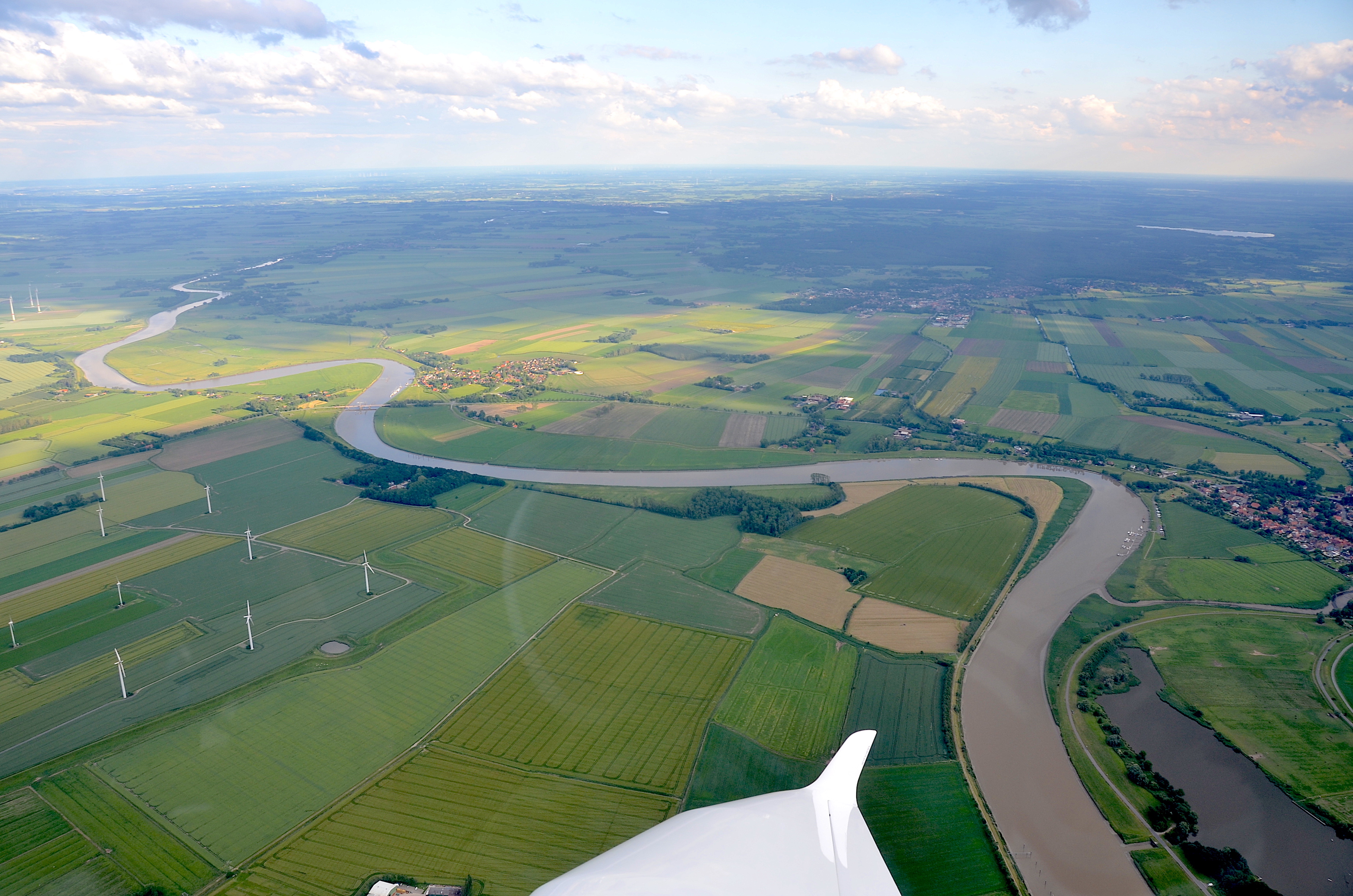
Oste between Neuhaus (Oste) and Geversdorf, view to the south

Oste (German pronunciation: [ˈoːstə, ˈɔstə]) is a river in northern Lower Saxony, Germany with a length of 156 km (97 mi). It is a left tributary of the Elbe.

The Oste flows through the districts of Harburg, Rotenburg, Stade, and Cuxhaven and empties into the Elbe River near Otterndorf. Its drainage area is 1.715 km^{2} (0.662 sq mi) and the decline between the source and the estuary is 31 m (102 ft). Tributaries are Ramme, Aue, Twiste, Bade, Bever, and Mehe.

The Oste is part of the Deutsche Fährstraße, an institution similar to the American National Scenic Byways. It connects various places between Bremervörde and Kiel with relation to the history of ferries and crossing of rivers, like the historic transporter bridges in Rendsburg and Osten. Also at the Oste, there are two pram ferries in Gräpel and Brobergen. The ferry in Gräpel is actually manually operated.

Although recognized as an official waterway, the Oste does not have much shipping traffic.

The river has its source near Tostedt at the border of the Lüneburg Heath, flowing to the west, passing Sittensen and Zeven, changing direction to the north, and passing Bremervörde, where the influence of the tides is starting, Hemmoor, and Neuhaus.

== See also ==
- List of rivers of Lower Saxony
