= Creditrans =

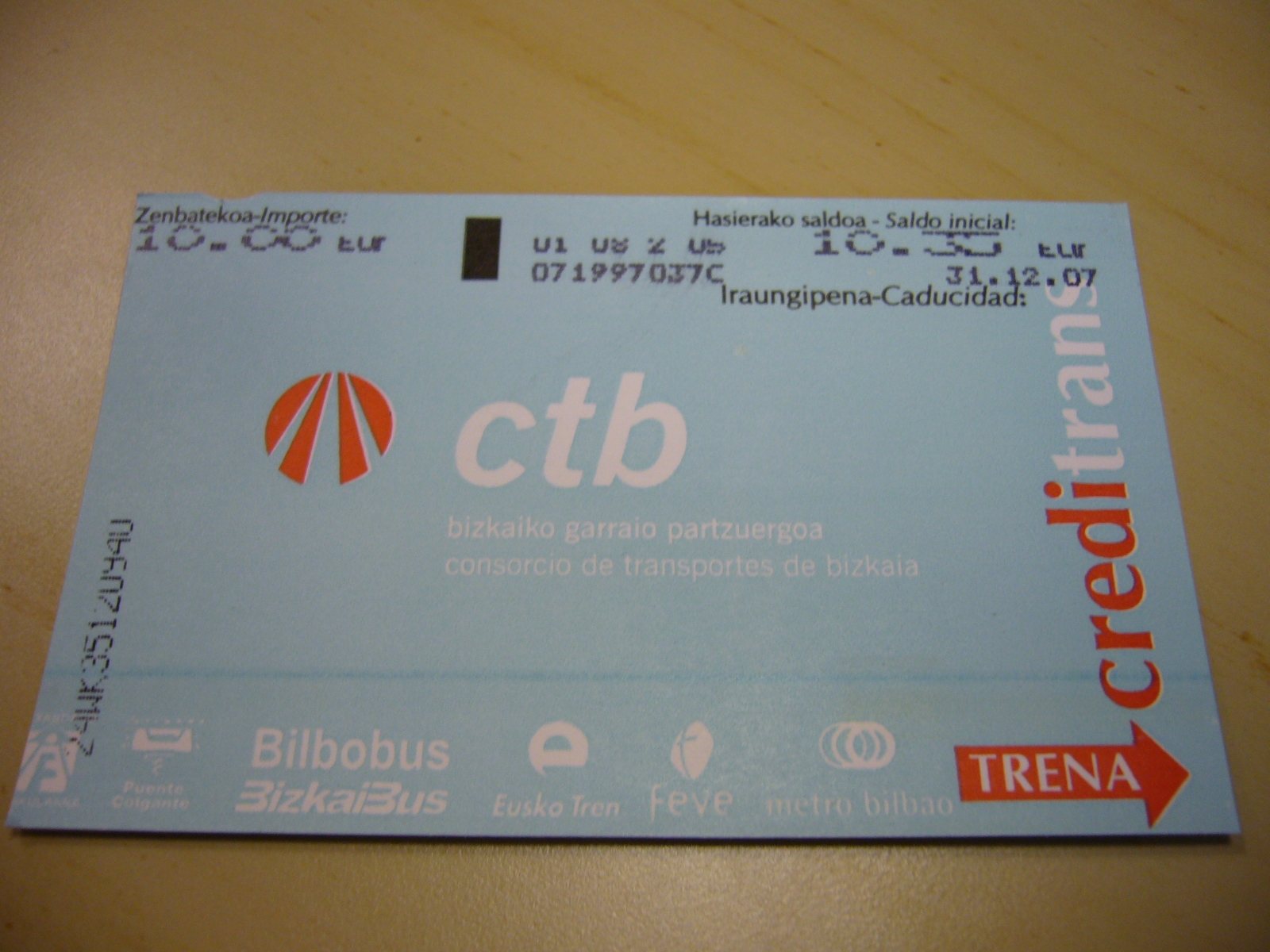
Creditrans card.

Creditrans was a travel card used to travel around Biscay, in the Basque Country (Spain). The card was the most popular ticket in the area, used by over 100 million passengers in 2007.

== History ==
When the Bilbao Metro system was created in 1995 the local authorities realized that the transport system integration around Bilbao was very deficient. There were four rail companies (five after the opening of the tramway) and two bus companies, each one with different zones and fare systems, plus different ticket machines and even ticket sizes.

The Biscay Transport Consortium (CTB), created in 1975 to build the underground, was the public company that would lead the efforts to overcome the situation.

After some efforts to adapt the machines and information systems, the bus and underground were integrated, the basque railways soon followed and finally FEVE entered the system in 2006.

The last remaining company to join the system was Renfe, which operates three rail lines in the area, the company was incorporated to the Creditrans system during 2009.

In 2012 the Creditrans tickets were replaced by plastic Barik card which work on the same principle except you can add credit to them through the regular ticket machines instead of buying a new card each time.

== Operation ==
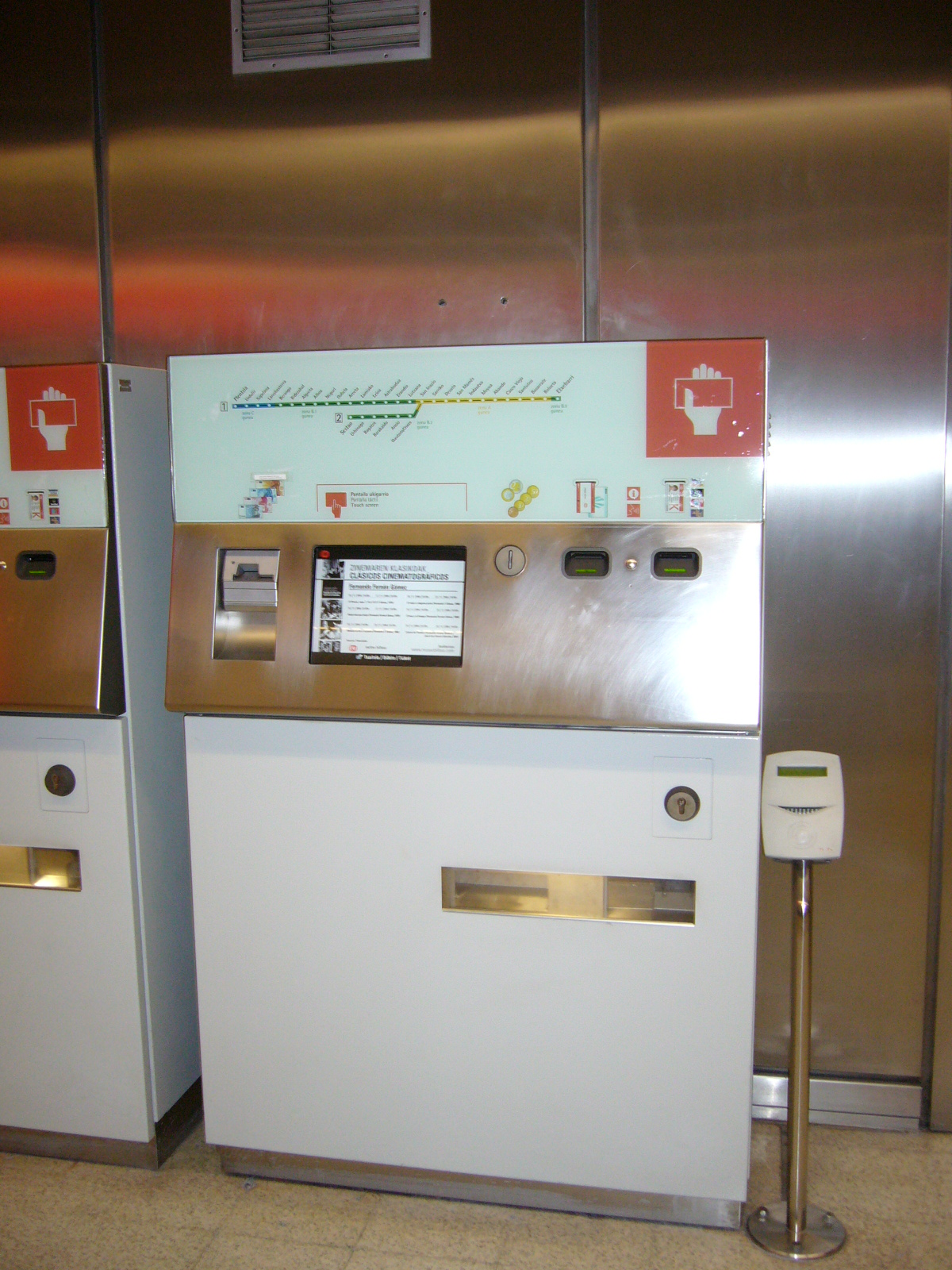
Underground vending machine, where Creditrans can be acquired.

The card worked as a cash card of 5, 10 and 15 € value. It could be acquired at the underground vending machines, tramway vending machines, tobacconists and ATMs.

When a Creditrans is validated, the amount subtracted from its denomination is variable depending on the transport used. Also, when using two transports in a row (for instance Underground and bus) a 20% discount is applied on the second trip.

== Companies ==
- Metro Bilbao
- Bilbobus
- BizkaiBus
- EuskoTren
- FEVE
- EuskoTran
- Vizcaya Bridge
- Artxanda Funicular
