= Julio de Arteche =

Spanish businessman and banker

- Born: Julio Francisco Domingo de Arteche y Villabaso; 4 August 1878; Bilbao, Biscay, Spain
- Died: 12 June 1960 (aged 81); Las Arenas, Getxo, Spain
- Citizenship: Spanish
- Occupations: Banker; Businessman
- Known for: President of Banco de Bilbao

President of Banco de Bilbao
- In office 31 January 1942 – 12 July 1960
- Preceded by: Víctor Artola
- Succeeded by: Gervasio Collar y Luis

Julio Francisco Domingo de Arteche y Villabaso (4 August 1878 – 12 July 1960) was a Spanish businessman and banker who served as the first non-rotating president of the Banco de Bilbao.

He was a prominent businessman although he maintained a certain political activity in the early 1920s, being a deputy for Markina in 1923. At the age of 25, he was appointed as a director of Banco Bilbao, and remained link to it for six decades and from there to a multitude of companies. Among other things, he was the president of the administrative councils of ten companies and companies and the vice-president of three others.

He was the first Count of Arteche between 1950 and 1963. He was the brother of Antonio, the first Marquis of Buniel, deputy to the Cortes between 1905 and 1923 for Burgos.

== Early and personal life ==
Julio de Arteche was born on 4 August 1878 on Luchana Street in Bilbao, as the son of José Maria de Arteche y Osante, a liberal politician from Biscay, and Maria Elisa Villabaso Gorrita, the sister of José Luis de Villabaso Gorrita.

In 1902, Arteche married Magdalena Olábarri y Zubiría (1881–1969), daughter of José María Olábarri Massino, a member of one of the founding families of the Santa Ana de Bolueta steel company, and Manuela Zubiría e Ybarra, belonging to the powerful and influential Ybarra family group. The couple settled in Las Arenas and had six children: Magdalena, José María, María Victoria, Teresa, Isabel, and Francisco Javier.

== Professional career ==
=== First projects ===
After completing his secondary education studies, Arteche began his higher education in 1894 at the University of Deusto, where he performed engineering studies. He planned to become an industrial engineer, but abandoned his studies when he was just three classes short of a degree after being appointed as the Director of the Banco de Bilbao in 1903, at 25 years of age, thus being the youngest member of the board. He got this position mainly thanks to the influence of his uncle José Luis, who had been the managing director of Banco del Comercio before becoming the chief executive officer (CEO) of Banco de Bilbao. He entered the board of the Banco de Bilbao on 31 December 1903 and remained there throughout his entire professional career and for the rest of his life until he died, except for a brief period in which the Basque Government of José Antonio Aguirre relieved the directors of their positions.

The first time that Arteche achieved notoriety was on the occasion of the First World War, when he was the president of the Agrupación de Sociedades Anónimas del Norte de España organization, taking an effective position in the decisions of the serious problems that arose after the war on the extraordinary profits and the change in fiscal taxes.

Between 1918 and 1920, Arteche took part in some of the main business initiatives of the Banco de Bilbao in those years. For instance, once the war was over, he participated in the process of its internationalization by collecting the assets of the former Mildred & Goyeneche house in London and repurposed it as the Bank's branch in London. He also had a prominent role in the process of nationalization of the securities of the large Spanish railway companies, which in Bilbao acquired particular importance due to the interest among local businessmen in improving the port's communication routes with the interior of the Iberian Peninsula. As a result of this process, an important part of the capital of the Compañía de los Caminos de Hierro del Norte de España (Norte) passed into Bilbao hands and several local businessmen joined its Board of Directors, including Arteche, who was representing the interests of the Banco de Bilbao. Both he and his uncle played a very active role in Consortium of Saltos del Duero and the Sociedad Hispano-Portuguesa de Transportes Eléctricos, two companies launched by the Banco de Bilbao to carry out the necessary procedures and works with which the most important hydroelectric business of the moment would be launched: the Saltos do Douro.

At the beginning of the 1920s, the figure of Julio de Arteche was consolidated within the Board of the Banco de Bilbao, and he combined his position there with his membership on the boards of this bank and its subsidiary, Banco del Comercio, and that of the Compañía de Ferrocarriles del Norte, Arteche was president of the Hispano-Portuguesa de Transportes Eléctricos and the director of such representative companies of the Biscayan economy, such as Papelera Española, Compañía Marítima del Nervión, Alambres de Cadagua, and Compañía de los Ferrocarriles de Santander a Bilbao.

=== President of Banco de Bilbao ===
In January 1941, during a critical period in which Banco de Bilbao needed to adapt to the complicated circumstances in which Spain found itself after the Spanish Civil War and also to strict government measures, the then CEO José Manuel Figueras resigned and Víctor Artola was appointed as his successor, and in the following year, on 31 January 1942, in the first Annual General Meeting since 1936, the General shareholders approved the reform of the entity's statutes, with the most important change being to set aside the tradition of rotating the chairmanship of the board of directors on an annual basis and then unanimously appointed the 64-year-old Arteche as its first permanent president, abandoning the rotating nature that this position had until then. The professional partnership of Artola as CEO and Arteche as chairman was decisive in allowing Banco de Bilbao to successfully navigate the difficult years of the 1940s, and together, they turned the bank into an entity with a national presence without sacrificing international ambitions. From the moment he became chairman, Arteche's activity was marked by the modernization that he introduced in the Banco de Bilbao and by the effective participation that he and the entity he presided had in a good number of companies in very diverse productive sectors.

Regarding the first aspect, Arteche piloted the modernization of the Bank of Bilbao, creating its central administration in the 1940s and opening its foreign service in 1945, while developing a territorial network of offices throughout Spain. Regarding the second aspect, he promoted and undertook the development of economic sectors of the first magnitude, becoming the president of such relevant companies as Iberduero, Nitratos de Castilla, La Papelera Española, Cellophane Española, Constructora Nacional de Maquinaria Eléctrica, and the Spanish Society of Electromechanical Constructions (SECEM). In this last task, Arteche, like so many other representatives of private business interests, had to confront the statist policy promoted by Juan Antonio Suanzes during his first stage at the head of the Instituto Nacional de Industria (INI), seeking to make compatible the private interests that it represented with the actions of the public institute.

Arteche was also a member of the Board of the Bank of Spain as a representative of the Superior Banking Council, and held the vice presidency of two large companies located in two strategic sectors: communications and automotive: the National Telephone Company of Spain (Telefónica) and the Spanish Society of Touring Cars (Spanish: Sociedad Española de Automóviles de Turismo, SEAT). He also served as a director in Naviera Vizcaina, Aeronautical Construction Association, Minas Riotinto company, and the Asturian Bank for Industry and Commerce.

Those who knew him emphasized his great ability to maintain relationships and his fine diplomatic skills. His economic and financial contribution from business management positions resulted in his permanence in the governing bodies of the Banco de Bilbao for 56 years (1903–1960), more than half a century of a life that lasted for 81 years, and was reflected in the ideal of its business work: continuous development, the constant search for economic modernity.

== Outside of business ==
To his business personality, the Count of Arteche added social, literary, cultural, religious, and political concerns that offer a more complete dimension of his person. In his cultural aspect, his participation in the Bilbao gathering of the Golden Lion with local personalities such as Dr. Areilza and Julio Eguileor stood out. His activities in museum boards and cultural works in his surroundings were also known.

His faith in Christianity, on the other hand, manifested itself in the form of a special pious work, highlighting his visits to the monastery of Silos, whose maintenance he generously supported. He was even distinguished with the grand cross of the Royal Order of Isabella the Catholic.

== Sporting career ==
In 1902, the 24-year-old Arteche and his younger brother Antonio were among the members of Sporting Club de Bilbao, being the no. 25 and 26 respectively. His love for recreational boating, hunting, and shooting was evident.

== Politic career ==
In the 1923 Spanish general elections for deputies to the Cortes on 30 April 1923, Arteche presented himself as a candidate for the Monarchist League in the district of Markina in Biscay, which he won, but his political work was cut short on the following 12 September following the coup d'état by Primo de Rivera.

== Noble title and death ==
On 18 July 1950, the Spanish State of Francisco Franco, in recognition of his work, granted him the aristocratic title of Count of Arteche because "with his effort and intelligence has been working tirelessly for the growth of the industry and the national economy". At 70 years of age, he returned to school and completed the three courses that he had put on hold at age 25, thus becoming an engineer while in his 70s, which gives an idea of his firm character.

Arteche held both the noble title and the chairmanship of Banco de Bilbao until he died at his home in Las Arenas, Getxo on 12 July 1960, just before his 82nd birthday. His mortal remains were buried in Balmaseda. He was succeeded in the Banco de Bilbao by Gervasio Collar y Luis and in his noble title by his son José María de Arteche y Olabarri in a letter dated 22 March 1963, who thus became the second Count of Arteche.

== Legacy ==
Two days after his death, the local press reported on the posthumous awarding of the Gold Medal of Vizcaya and the Town of Bilbao, announcing that a street or town would be named after him, and in fact, this square is still visible today in a small avenue in the Conde de Arteche, located at one of the links of Bilbao's Gran Vía with the Doña Casilda Iturrizar Park, a short distance from the Bilbao Fine Arts Museum.
