= Olaso =

Olaso is a Basque surname. Notable people with the surname include:

- Guillermo Olaso (born 1988), Spanish tennis player
- Luis Olaso (1900–1982), Spanish football player
- Khymer Olaso (born 1978), Filipino politician
- Miguel de Olaso (born 1980), Spanish commercial cinematographer
- House of Olaso, Basque noble family
