= Antonio de Arteche =

Spanish lawyer and politician

- Born: Antonio de Arteche Villabaso; 8 January 1880; Bilbao, Biscay, Spain
- Died: 26 January 1962 (aged 82); Bilbao, Biscay, Spain
- Citizenship: Spanish
- Occupations: Lawyer; Politician
- Known for: Vice president of the chamber of the Congress of Deputies

Vice president of the chamber of the Congress of Deputies

Antonio de Arteche Villabaso (8 January 1880 – 26 January 1962) was a Spanish lawyer and politician. He was a deputy for Burgos between 1905 and 1918, and again between 1921 and 1923.

He was the first Marquis of Buniel, a noble title that he held from 1916 until 1962. He was the younger brother of Julio, the first Count of Arteche, deputy to the Cortes in 1923, and president for life of Banco de Bilbao (1942–1960).

== Early and personal life ==
Antonio de Arteche was born on 8 January 1880 in Bilbao, as the son of Juan Antonio Villabaso Uribarri and María Jesús Gorrita Echavarri. On 12 October 1901, he married Gertrudis Ortiz de la Riva, and the couple had four children, María de la Paz, the twins Luis María and Juan Cruz, and María del Pilar de Arteche y Ortiz de la Riva.

At some point, he and his family acquired the Palacio Horcasitas, where they lived. Arteche was one of the last owners of the Arana Tower house located on street Arane.

== Politic career ==
Arteche premiered as a deputy in the Cortes for Burgos in the 1905 Spanish general election as a liberal, and held this position until 10 January 1918, and again between 19 December 1920 and 15 September 1923, this time with the liberal left. He also held the secretariat and vice presidency of the chamber of the Congress of Deputies.

Arteche was an open-minded man who treasured publications that "could have brought political problems to any family outside the noble sphere", such as texts on minutes of Senate sessions, foreign policy, architecture, law, sexual education "and a thousand other topics that give us a vision of the polarization of interwar Europe".

== Sporting career ==
In 1902, the 24-year-old Arteche and his older brother Julio were among the members of Sporting Club de Bilbao, being the no. 25 and 26 respectively.

== Death and legacy ==
On 18 March 1916, King Alfonso XIII granted him the aristocratic title of Marquis of Buniel by royal decree and dispatch issued on 27 May of the same year. Following his death in Bilbao on 26 January 1962, he was succeeded by his son Juan Cruz (1908–1973) on 30 March 1964 in a letter dated 11 January, who thus became the second Marquis of Buniel. His first-born son Luis María (1908–1991) renounced the title. He studied abroad and enjoyed summers in Balmaseda. In the Spanish Civil War, he was tasked with digging trenches on the battlefield.

Arteche was also awarded the Grand Cross of the Order of Isabel the Catholic.
