= Larreineta funicular =

Funicular in Biscay, Basque Country, Spain

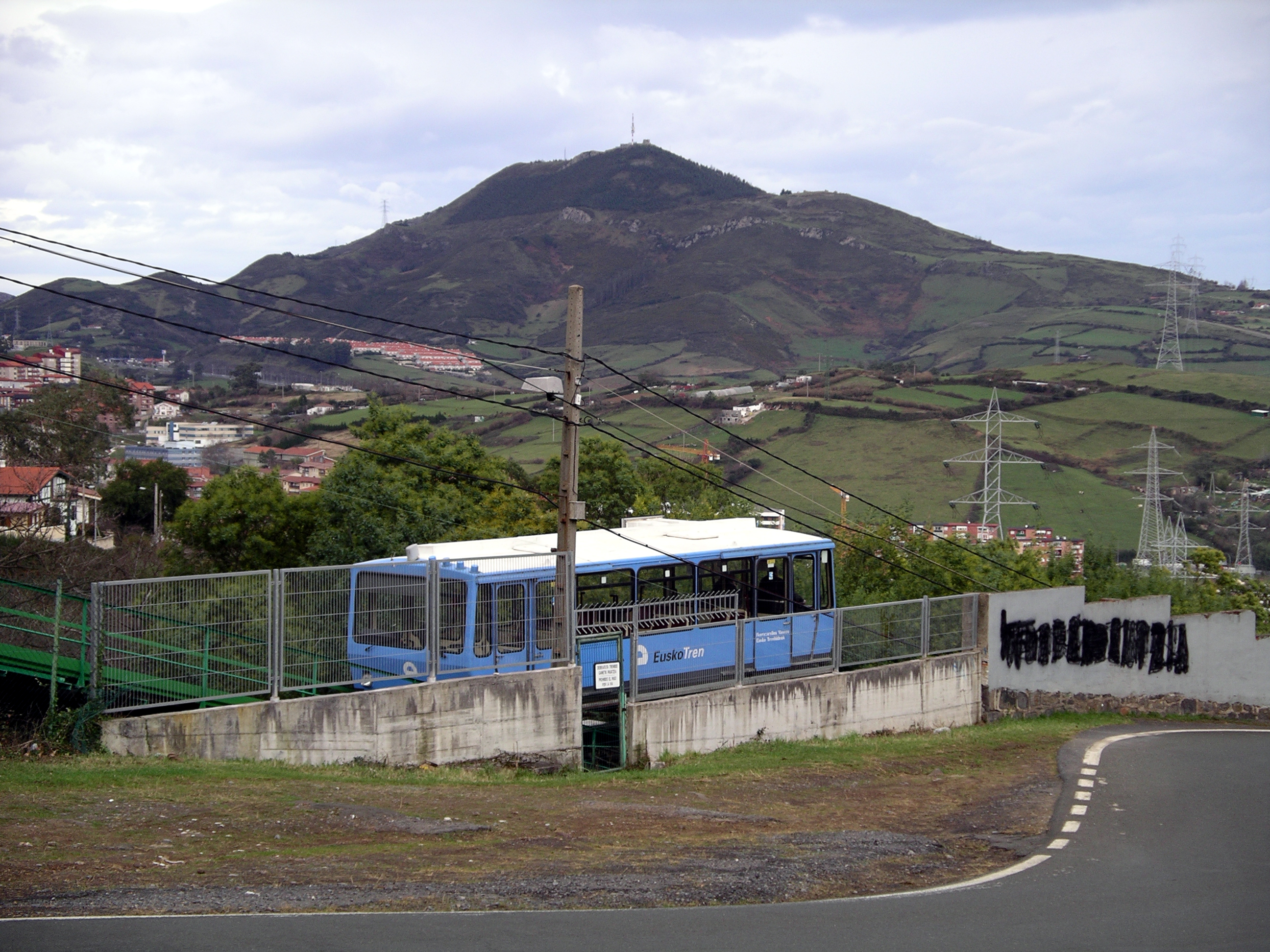

Overview
- Locale: Valle de Trápaga-Trapagaran, Spain
- Termini: Escontrilla; Larreineta
- Stations: 2

Service
- Type: Funicular
- Operator(s): Euskotren
- Ridership: 134,000 (2019)

History
- Opened: 1926

Technical
- Line length: 1,179 m (0.733 mi)
- Number of tracks: Single-track with passing loop
- Track gauge: 1,200 mm (3 ft 11 1/4 in)

The Larreineta funicular (Basque: Larreinetako funikularra; Spanish: Funicular de Larreineta) is a funicular railway in the municipality of Valle de Trápaga-Trapagaran in the Basque Country, Spain. It links the downtown with the neighborhood of Larreineta.

== History ==
The construction of the funicular was first proposed in 1912. Construction started in 1920 and after several delays, it was inaugurated in 1926. Originally, it carried both passengers and freight. In 1985, it was transferred to the Basque Government, and since 1994 it has been operated by Euskotren.

== Operation ==
Services run every 30 minutes throughout most of the day. Tickets can be bought at the stations, or the Barik card can be used.
