= House of Olaso =

The House of Olaso is a Basque noble family originally from Trapagaran. Jośe Rufino de Olaso y de la Puente (1839–1918) was granted the rank of Marquess by Pope Pius X on 15 January 1914. His son Luis Saturnino Julián de Olaso y Madaria (1880–1947), the 2nd Marquess, obtained the formal recognition of the title in the Kingdom of Spain on 13 March 1920. The 4th Marquess of Olaso was a shipowner in Bilbao.

Jośe Rufino de Olaso's older brother Julián de Olaso (1832–1910) emigrated to Argentina where he became a wealthy business magnate. He then returned to Spain, where he settled in Bilbao and became the Argentine Consul.

== Palaces ==
The Olaso Palace in Trapagaran and the Palace of the Marquesses of Olaso (Palacio del Marques de Olaso) in Neguri were built for the family.

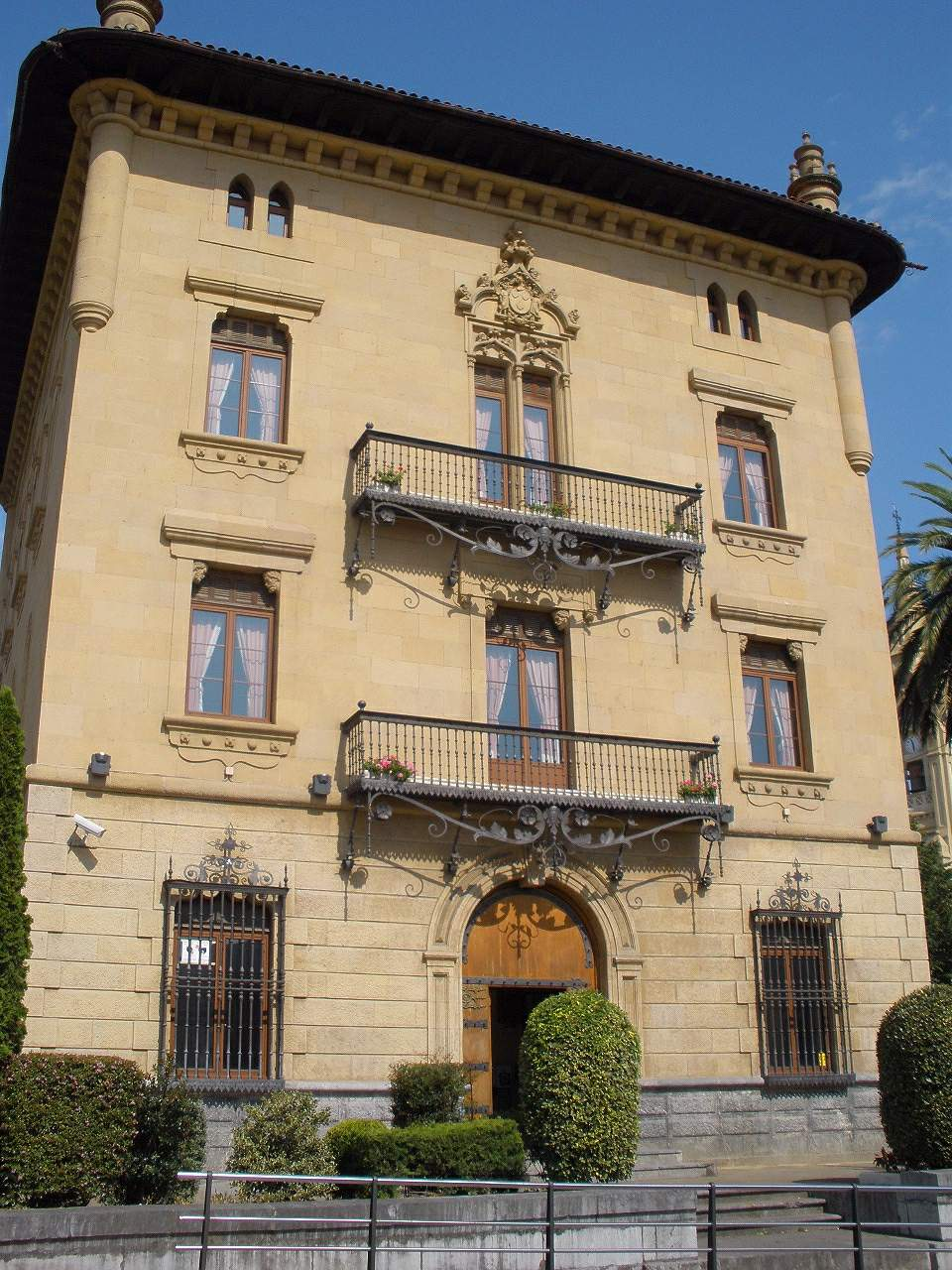
Olaso Palace in Trapagaran

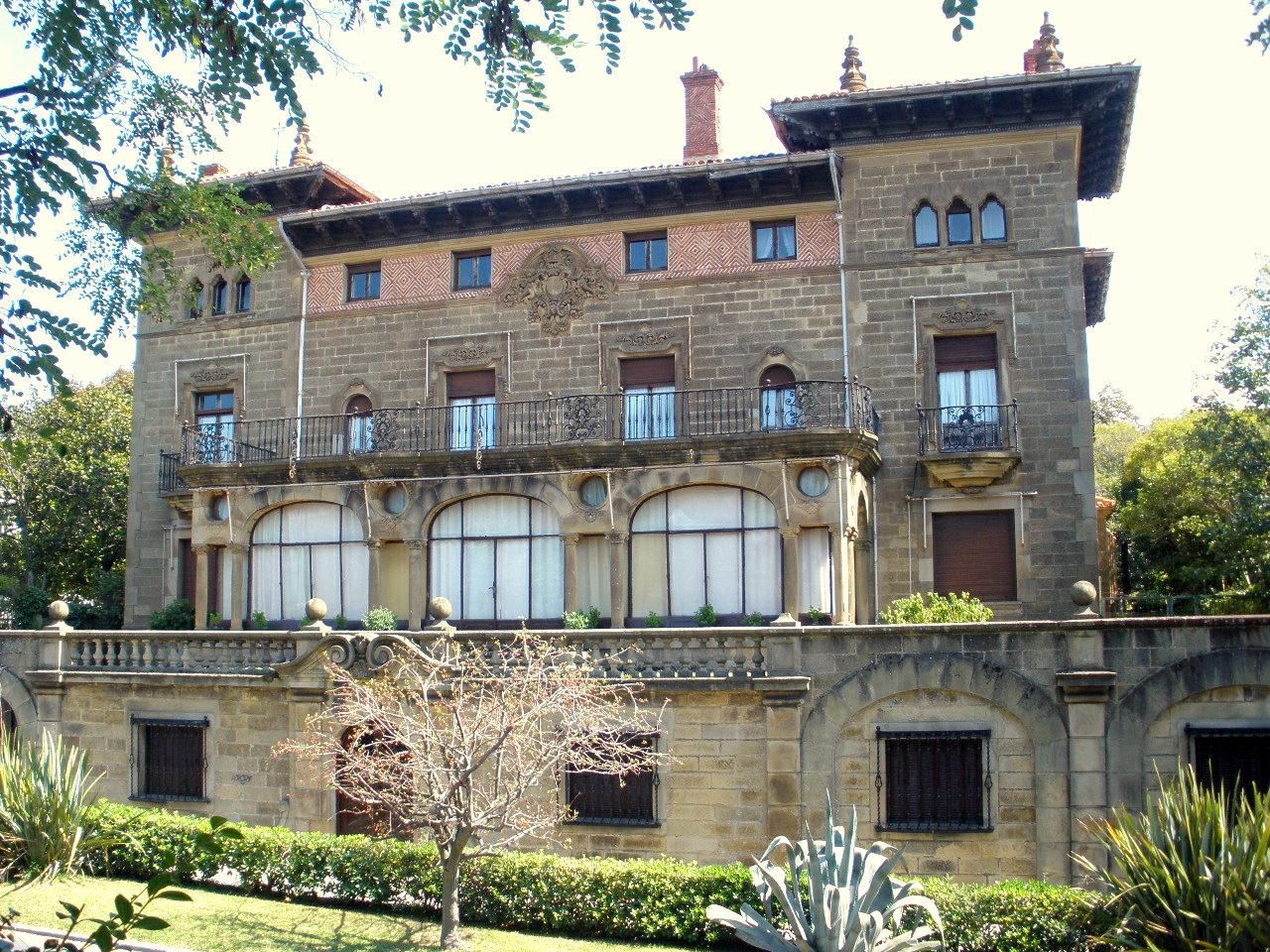
The Palace of the Marquesses of Olaso (Palacio del Marques de Olaso) in Neguri
