= Las Arenas =

Neighborhood in Getxo

Coordinates: 43°19′32″N 3°00′47″W

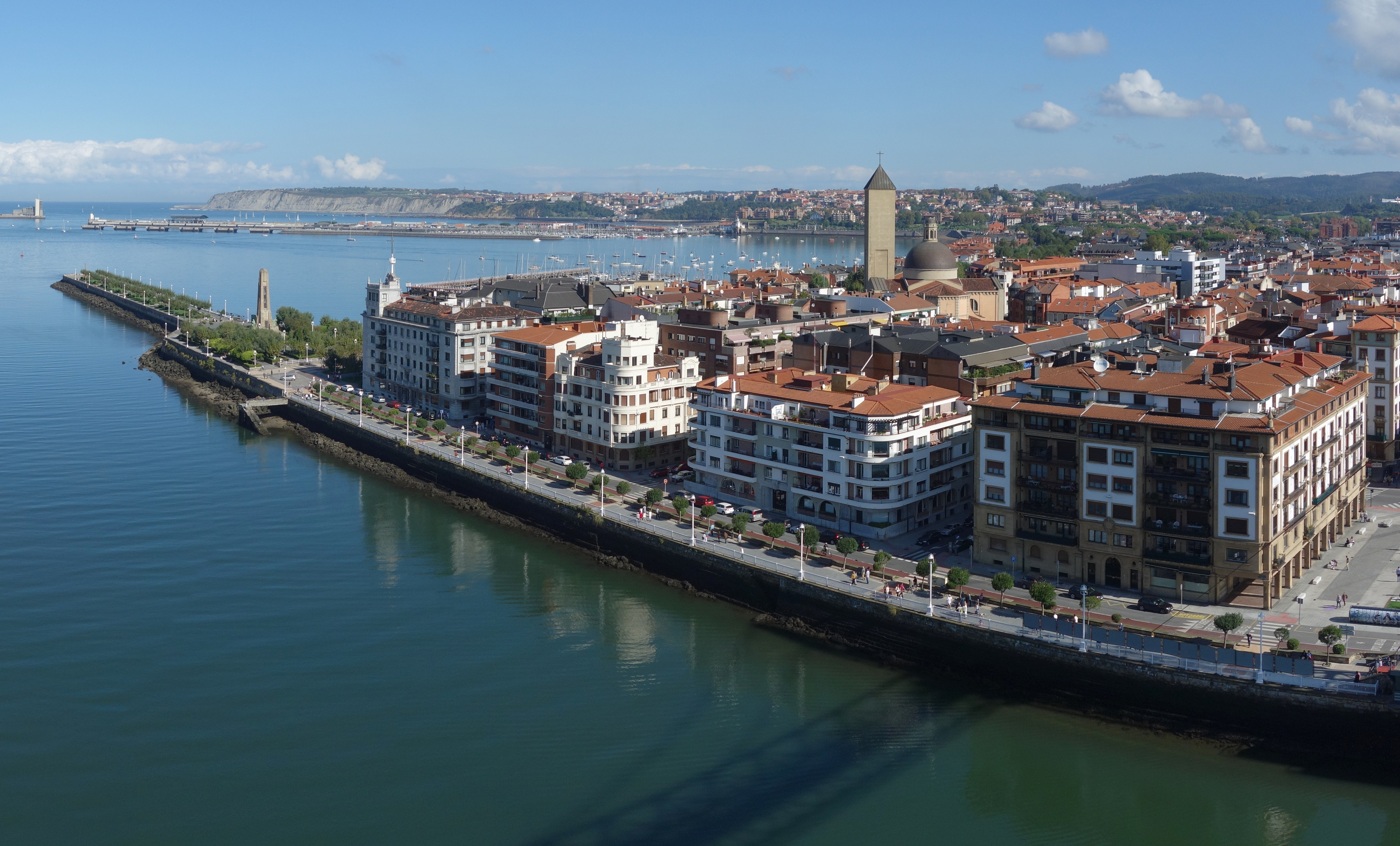
View of Las Arenas from the Vizcaya Bridge

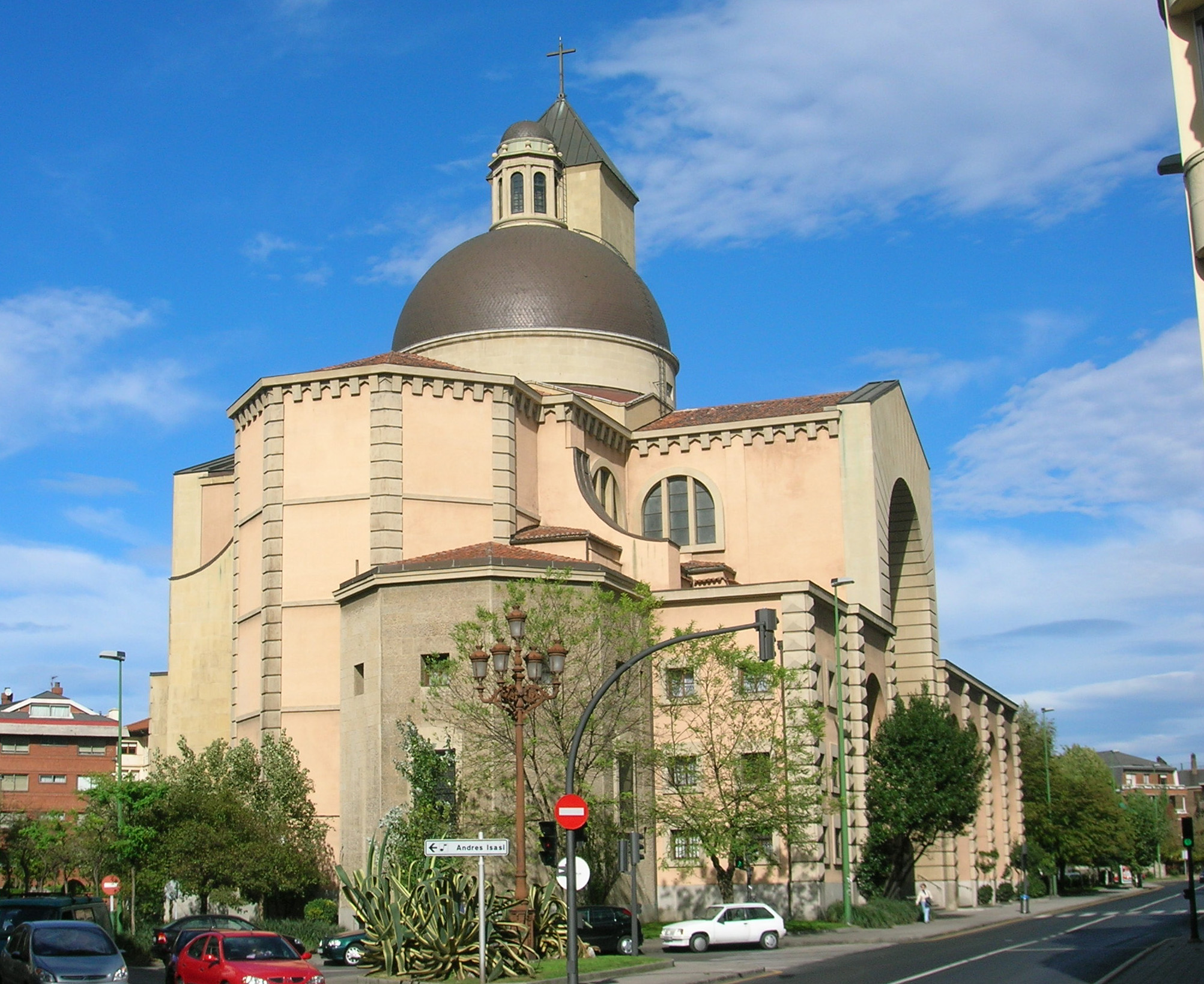
Our Lady of Mercy Church, 1947, in Las Arenas, Spain.

Areeta (Las Arenas in Spanish) is a neighbourhood of Getxo (Biscay, Basque Country, Spain). It is an affluent residential area that was built over the sands of a beach where the Gobela Creek died into a diffuse delta at the mouth of the Estuary of Bilbao in the early 20th century.

It is connected to Portugalete at the other side of the firth by the Vizcaya Bridge transporter bridge and offers a marina, a small beach that can unfortunately be polluted, and a monument to Evaristo Churruca, who planned and directed the channelization of the estuary.

The Vizcaya Bridge is now a tourist attraction, being the first bridge able to carry people and vehicles on a suspended gondola.

== Neighbourhoods ==
It can be divided in three neighbourhoods:

- Central Areeta, around the Main Street, location of many shops, restaurants and bars.
- Santa Ana, a quiet residential area, named after the small church located in the eponymous plaza.
- Zugazarte, an area of more affluent homes along a road and park, looking to the sea and neighbouring Neguri.

Sometimes the neighbouring district of Erromo is also included in Areeta, but this is surely a misuse, as Erromo was built for the working classes and was separated by the suburban railroad until it was recycled by the Bilbao Metro in its subway system and by the canalized Gobela creek.

== Public transport ==
Public transport to and from the area is provided by the Bilbao Metro, with Areeta (Las Arenas) station in the centre of the area flanked by Lamiako (a mainly industrial district) and Gobela (a wealthy residential area), and BizkaiBus, whose yellow buses provide services throughout Biscay. The Barik card can be used on the metro, the bus system, and also to cross the Vizcaya Bridge. A small passenger ferry also operates across the river between Areeta and Portugalete.

== Places and buildings of interest ==
Vizcaya Bridge was declared a UNESCO World Heritage Site in 2006 for being one of the most outstanding buildings made of iron during the Industrial Revolution. It was opened to the public in 1893 as the first mechanic bridge in the world, and it is still working at present.
