= Valle de Trápaga-Trapagaran =

Valle de Trápaga-Trapagaran Trapagaran (in Basque) Valle de Trápaga (in Spanish)
- Municipality
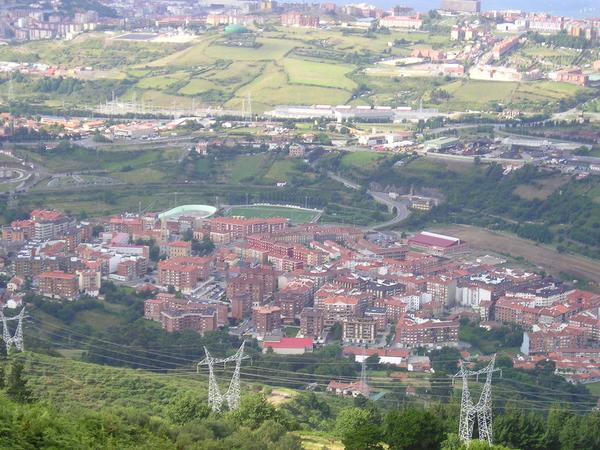

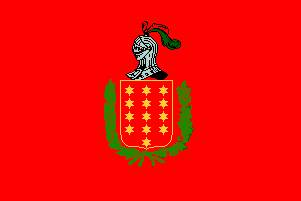
- Flag Coat of arms

- Location of Valle de Trápaga-Trapagaran within the Basque Country
- Coordinates: 43°18′22″N 3°2′8″W
- Country: Spain
- Autonomous community: Basque Country
- Province: Biscay
- Eskualdea: Greater Bilbao
- Founded: 1841

Government
  - Alcalde: Xabier Cuellar (EAJ-PNV)

Area
  - Total: 13.1 km^{2} (5.1 sq mi)
- Elevation: 35 m (115 ft)

Population (2025-01-01)
  - Total: 11,797
  - Density: 901/km^{2} (2,330/sq mi)
- Time zone: UTC+1 (CET)
  - Summer (DST): UTC+2 (CEST)
- Postal code: 48510
- Website: Official website

Valle de Trápaga-Trapagaran (Basque: Trapagaran, Spanish: Valle de Trápaga) is a town and municipality located in the province of Biscay, in the autonomous community of Basque Country, northern Spain. It is located near Barakaldo, Portugalete and Ortuella. Iron ore has been mined here since Roman times and the two parts of the municipality, which are at different altitudes, are linked by a funicular railway. According to the 2019 census, it has 11,985 inhabitants.

== Geography ==
Valle de Trápaga-Trapagaran is located 12 km (7 mi) from Bilbao in the Triano mountain range in the province of Biscay. The municipality is divided into two zones. Ninety percent of the population live in the lower zone in the neighbourhoods of Durañona, El Juncal, Elguero, Galindo-Salcedillo, Valle de Trápaga, which is the administrative centre, Trápaga-Causo and Ugarte. The upper zone is in the mountains of Triano, and the neighbourhoods here are La Arboleda, Matamoros-Burzaco, Parcocha-Barrionuevo and La Reineta. The European route E70 running along the north coast of Spain, passes the town.

The upper zone is connected to the lower zone by the BI-3755 road and by a funicular railway; the funicular is the only one in the country with horizontal cabins, and allows panoramic views over the Estuary of Bilbao. The town of Valle de Trápaga-Trapagaran expanded with the mining activities and most of the buildings date from the late nineteenth and early twentieth centuries. The church of San José Obrero is built in Romanesque style while the church of San Juan Bautista is neoclassical, as is the city hall, which was built in the first decade of the twentieth century.

Iron ore has been mined here since Roman times and there was a great increase in mining activity and residential development in the upper zone after the building of the railway in the late nineteenth century. The iron ore deposits became exhausted in the mid-twentieth century and now the area is residential and recreational, although traces of its industrial past remain. Many of the former mines have been flooded and turned into recreational areas with sports facilities and lakes stocked with fish.
