= Barik card =

Rechargeable pay card for public transport in Biscay, Spain

Barik Card
- Location: Biscay (Spain)
- Launched: 2004: piloted on the Bilbao Metro; 2011-2012: official launch
- Technology: MIFARE
- Manager: Biscay Transport Consortium
- Currency: Euro (€90 maximum load)
- Credit expiry: Seven years since the date of sale of the card
- Website: www.ctb.eus

Standard Barik

Personal Kide Barik

Personal Giza Barik

Barik (Biscayan Basque: [ˈba.ɾik], "[contact]less") is a rechargeable contactless smart card, electronic money used for public transport in Biscay (Spain).

It was launched in 2012 as successor of Creditrans travel card. It is available as a credit-card-sized card.

== Companies accepting Barik ==
The card can be used on most Biscay public transportation.

=== Railways ===
All railway operators accept the Barik card:

- Bilbao Metro
- Euskotren Trena
- Cercanías Bilbao (only Barik standard cards)
- Bilbao tram

=== Buses ===
Most buses operators accept the Barik card:

- BizkaiBus
- Bilbobus
- Etxebarri Bus
- E! Busa (Erandio)
- Kbus (Barakaldo)
- Sopelbus (Sopela)
- Lejoan Busa (Leioa)

=== Cable ===
- Vizcaya Bridge
- Ereaga lift
- Artxanda Funicular
- Larreineta funicular

=== Other services ===
- Car parks at Leioa, Etxebarri and Ansio (Bilbao Exhibition Centre) Bilbao Metro stations.
- Bike rental (Bizimeta)

== Tickets ==
A money ticket and two season tickets can be included in the Barik card.

The card can be top up at the Bilbao Metro station ticket machines, Bilbobus and Bizkaibus booths, establishments identified by the Barik symbol, Barik NFC App and online at the Biscay Transport Consortium website.

=== Money ticket ===
A prepaid ticket in which the price of each trip is deducted. The maximum value that a Barik card may hold is €90. The minimum top up is €5.

Available money tickets:

- Creditrans: The default ticket.
- Gizatrans: The ticket on Giza cards.

Different fares will be applied according to the covered zones. The fares charged to make the trips are settled by each institution or operator.

The territory of Biscay is divided into five fare zones in the form of circular crowns. The municipality of Bilbao, in the middle, is the zone 1. The other four zones are concentric to Bilbao municipality.

=== Season ticket ===
Available season tickets:

- Bidai 50 or 70: Valid for up to 50 or 70 journeys on 30 consecutive days. Valid on the Bilbao Metro, Euskotren, Bilbao tramway, Lejoan Busa, and Larreineta Funicular railway.
- Bidai Oro: Unlimited journeys for 30 consecutive days. Valid on the Bilbao Metro, Euskotren, Bilbao tramway, Lejoan Busa, and Larreineta Funicular railway.
- Gazte 70: A ticket for persons aged under 26 registered as resident in any municipality in Biscay. Valid for up to 70 journeys on 30 consecutive days. Valid on Bizkaibus, the Bilbao Metro, Euskotren, Bilbao tramway, Lejoan Busa, and Larreineta Funicular railway.
- Gazte Oro: A ticket for persons aged under 26 registered as resident in any municipality in Biscay. Unlimited journeys for 30 consecutive days. Valid on the Bilbao Metro, Euskotren, Bilbao tramway, Lejoan Busa, and Larreineta Funicular railway.
- Gazte Bilbao: Valid until January 2024. Unlimited journeys for 30 consecutive days. A ticket for persons aged under 26 registered as resident in any municipality in Biscay. Valid on Bilbobus and Artxanda Funicular railway.

One of the two season tickets will be the active ticket while the other will be a reserve ticket. The reserve is a pre-purchasing ticket (up to 4 days) that will become active on the date selected at the time of purchase of the ticket.

== Card types ==
=== Standard card ===
Barik standard cards can be purchased in Bilbao Metro and Renfe ticket machines, Bilbobus and Bizkaibus booths and establishments identified by the Barik symbol, and costs €3. They are sold active and with a Creditrans ticket. After the purchase must top up enough money.

Ten is the maximum number of people who can travel together with a standard card. Each traveller must scanning the card in the card reader and pass the card to the next person.

Barik standard cards can be registered or personalized in order to protected for loss or theft. The registration must be done at Customer Service offices.

=== Personal card ===
Is a nominative (with photo of the user) and non-transferable card, only the named holder can use it.

Available types:

- Kide (white): General card.
- Giza (red): Available only to persons older than 65, or some physical disability.

A personal card is required for purchasing all types of tickers. These cards must be acquired in the Customer Service offices.

==== Special conditions and discounts ====
Personalized cards offer cumulative discounts on regular prices of the purse and temporal titles for users who meet special conditions:

- Profile Gazte: Under 26 years registered as resident in Biscay.
- Profile Giza: Older than 65, or some physical disability.
- Profile Large family: Large Families Status both of General or Special category. The transports may apply discounts of 20% and 50% respectively.
- Profile Bilbotrans: Property of the Bilbao City Council. Money ticket of the Bilbobus service.

=== Bilbao Bizkaia Card ===
The Bilbao Bizkaia Card is a Barik variant designed for use by tourists. Can be only used for 24, 48 or 72 hours. It allows unlimited travel on public transport, priority access to cultural facilities, and discounts on leisure activities and restaurants.

Prices vary according to use (€10 for 24 hours, €15 for 48 hours, or €20 for 72 hours). They can be purchased at the Tourist Offices Information or on the official website.

== Usage ==
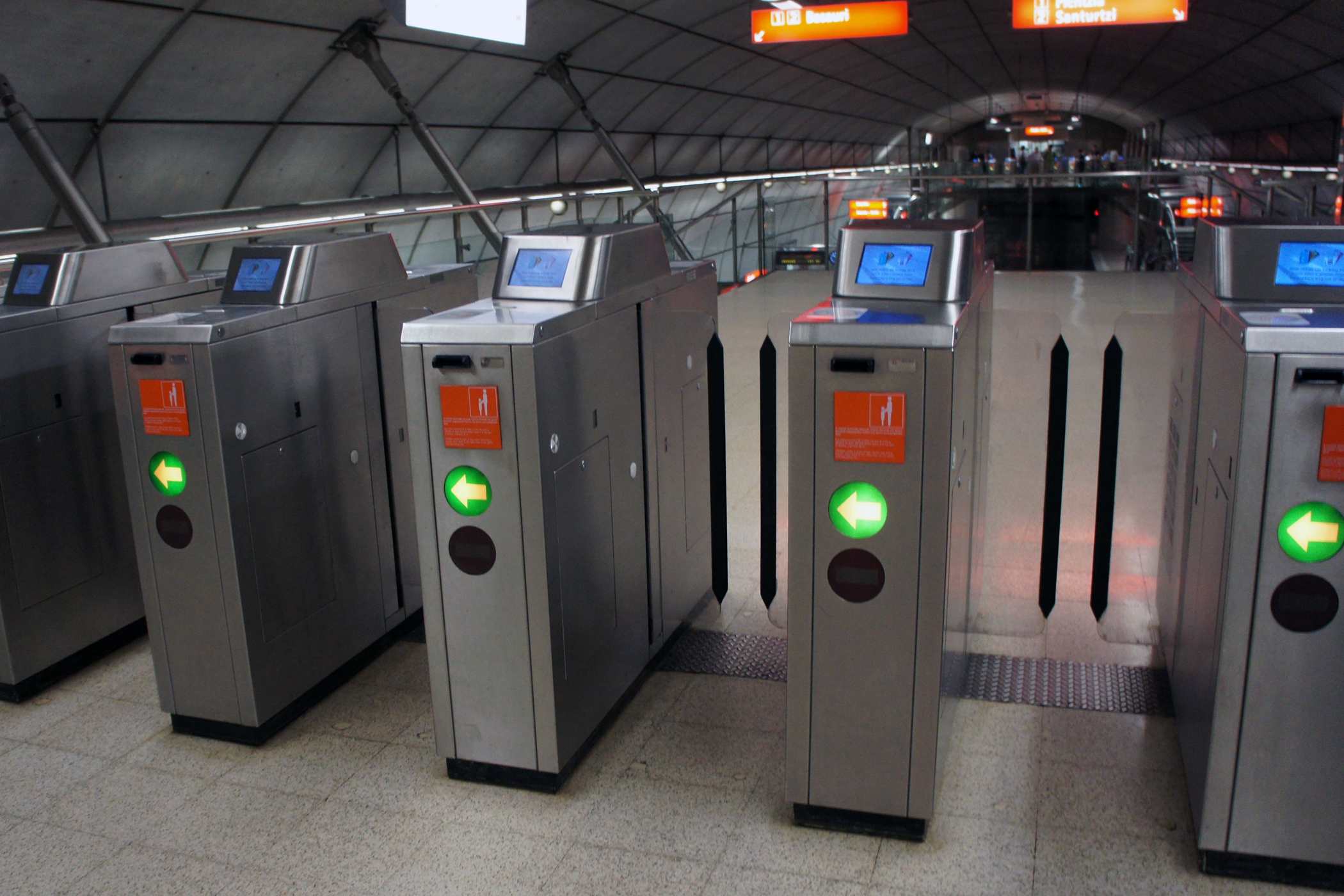
Bilbao Metro ticket barrier: The Barik screen is located at the top, in front and in white color the card reader.

Usage of the card involves scanning it at a card reader. The technology allows for the card to be read at some distance from the reader, so contact is not required. If the validation has been correct, a beep and a visual indicator (a green light or a message on the screen) will be heard. Readers may indicate an error if they detect multiple cards compatible with contactless technology. The balance on the card is displayed in a display.

The cards must be validated as follows:

- Bilbao Metro underground and railroads: The ticket is validated at the start and end of the journey.
- Bizkaibus: The ticket is validated in the bus at the start and end of the journey.
- Urban buses: The ticket is validated in the bus at the start of the journey.
- Tramway, Funicular Railways and Transporter bridge: The ticket is validated on the platform at the start of the journey.

If the ticket is not validated at the enter or exit, the amount charged will be the difference up to the highest price charged by the operador.

A transfer, discounted by an operator or the same operator between different lines, may be made in which a reduction will be applied to the amount for the second trip. There will be a restriction on the time interval to make transfers: 45 minutes in Urban trip made or 90 minutes Intercity trip made. The transfer between the 1, 2 and 3 lines of the Bilbao Metro in Zazpikaleak/Casco Viejo station and that between lines C-1, C-2 and C-3 lines in Basurto, Ametzola and Abando stations, and that between any two different Bizkaibus lines, within a time interval less than 15, 20 and 30 minutes (respectively) is considered a single trip.

== Reporting ==
Touch-screen ticket machines and Barik NFC App report and print the last 30 journeys, tickets, and balance.

The balance can be requested at sales point agents.

== Roll-out history ==
=== Pilot test ===
In 2004 a pilot test was carried out in which the Barik card could be used in certain stations and/or lines of the Bilbao Metro, Bilbobus and BizkaiBus, and the cards could be top up at ATMs Bilbao Bizkaia Kutxa and BBVA.

In the test 650 people were selected, thus issuing 650 cards. These could be used in the stations of Eliptikoa station, Areeta station, Barakaldo station and Sopelana station of the Bilbao Metro, on the lines Munguía-Bilbao (Archanda tunnels) and Bermeo-Munguía- UPV / EHU-Cruces / Gurutzeta of Bizkaibus, and on the line San Adrián-San Ignacio of Bilbobus.

The pilot test lasted six months, and was considered "a success" by the Biscay Transport Consortium. However, its implementation suffered constant delays, initially announcing that it would be introduced in 2006; the date of June 2009 was later announced, and then delayed again in late 2010 or early 2011.

Finally, and after five years of delays, in 2009 he Biscay Transport Consortium launched the Barik project.

=== Final roll-out ===
On September 29, 2011, the issuance of the first personalized Barik cards began. Since October 2011, 30,000 users have been testing the Barik card in the Bilbao Metro. Over the following months, new transportation companies were incorporated. The definitive implementation was from September 30, 2012, the date on which the system was opened to all users in phase, being available to the general public (last phase) on October 11, 2012. It coexisted with old paper and magnetic tickets until December 31, 2013, date in which tickets were definitively retreat.

July 2015: Extension of the original validity from four years to seven years.

December 2015: Top up via the Internet.

February 2016: Top up in NFC mobile phones.

November 2016: Pre-purchasing of the season tickets.

March 2017: CTB's new multi-modal season tickets.

== Popularity ==
In March 2014, it was announced that the one million cards were sold.

In 2014, it was announced that 100 million trips were exceeded.

In 2018, it was announced that the 80% of public transport trips are already paid with the Barik.

In 2025, the mobile Barik was implemented.

== Usage in other territories ==
Outside the territory of Biscay can be used:

- Euskotren Trena Bilbao-Donostia-Hendaia general line.
- Vitoria Tramway.
- DBUS (Donostia-San Sebastián) lines.
