= Artxanda Funicular =

Funicular railway in Bilbao, Spain

Coordinates: 43°16′15.31″N 2°55′22.49″W

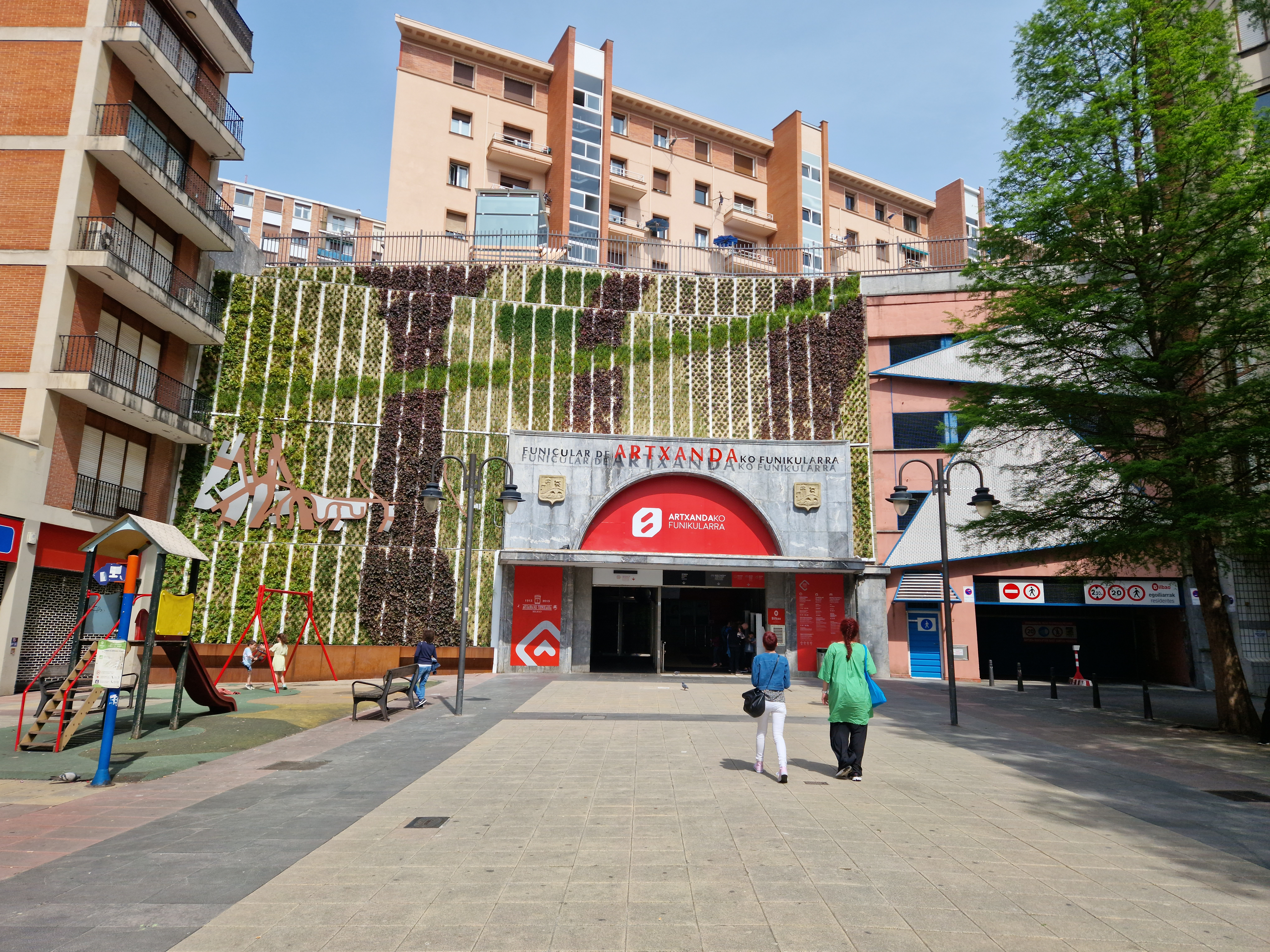
- Lower station, Plaza Funikularreko, 2023

Overview
- Locale: Bilbao, Spain
- Termini: Castaños; Artxanda
- Stations: 2

Service
- Type: Funicular
- Operator(s): Funicular de Artxanda S.A.
- Ridership: 1.03 million (2019)

History
- Opened: 1915

Technical
- Line length: 770 m (0.48 mi)
- Number of tracks: Single-track with passing loop
- Track gauge: 1,000 mm (3 ft 3 3/8 in) metre gauge

The Artxanda Funicular (Basque: Artxandako funikularra; Spanish: Funicular de Artxanda) is a funicular railway in the city of Bilbao in Spain's Basque Country. It links downtown Bilbao with the recreational area at the summit of the nearby Artxanda Mountain, which has a park, a single restaurant, a hotel, a sports complex, and offers panoramic views of the city.

== History ==
A cable railway to the top of the Artxanda mountain was first proposed in 1901, but not built due to lack of finance. The current funicular was opened in 1915. During the Spanish Civil War the funicular was damaged by bombing, but reopened in 1938. The funicular closed in 1976 after an accident that injured several employees of the operating company, and did not reopen again until April 1983. The line was closed again in August of the same year, as a result of flood damage, and did not reopen until November.

== Operation ==
The Bilbao departure point of the funicular is just north of Zubizuri bridge, on the right bank of the River Nervion, within walking distance of the Guggenheim Museum. Services run every 15 minutes throughout the day. Tickets can be bought at the stations, or the Barik card can be used.

The funicular is run by the Funicular de Artxanda S.A., a company wholly owned by the Municipality of Bilbao.

== Technical parameters ==
The funicular has the following technical parameters:

- Length: 770.34 meters
- Height: 226.49 meters
- Maximum steepness: 44,98 %
- Capacity: 70 people per car
- Trip time: 3 minutes
- Maximum speed: 5 metres per second
- Configuration: Single track with passing loop
- Traction: Electricity
