= Sietland =

Former local administrative division in Lower Saxony, Germany

- Samtgemeinde
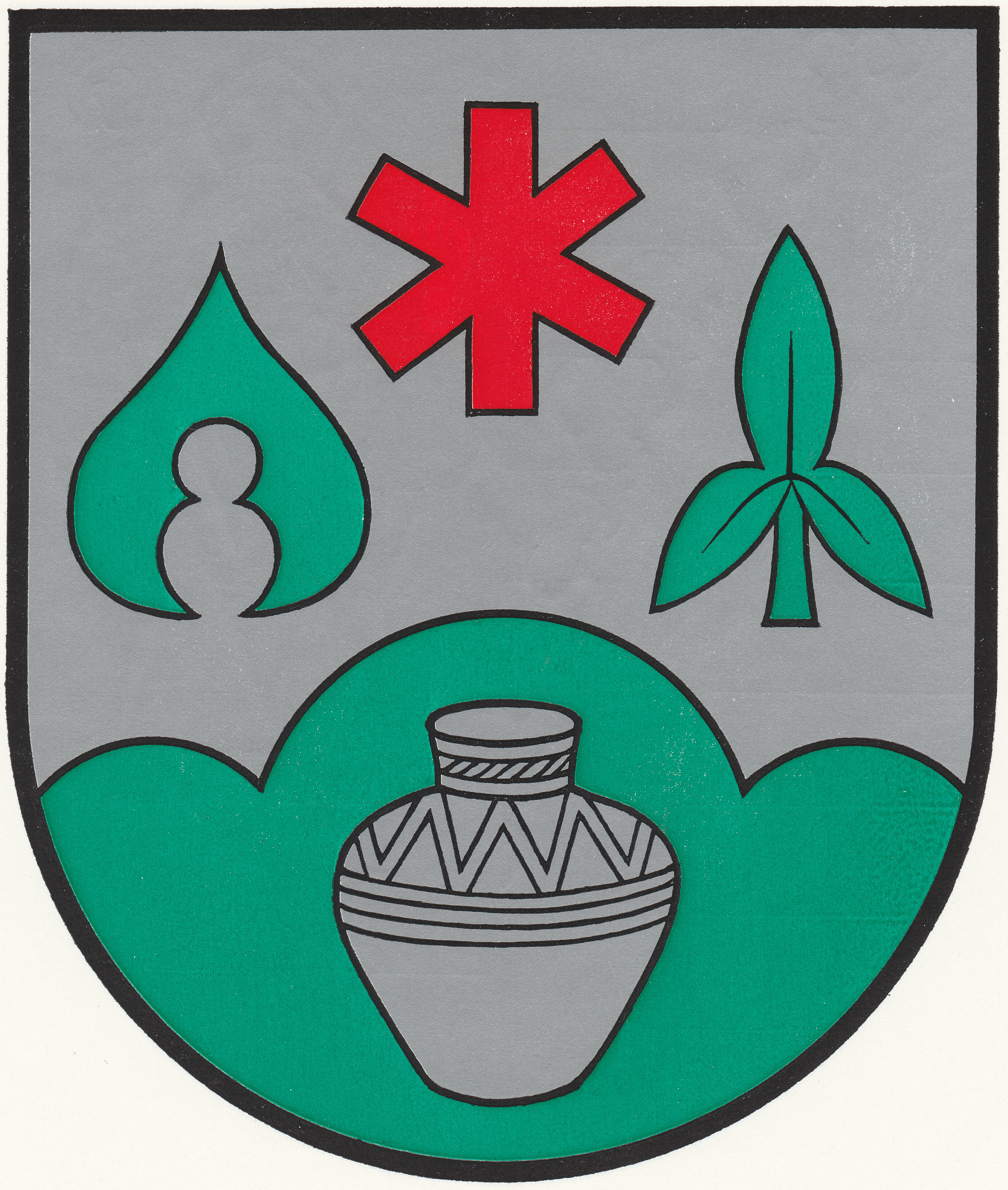
- Coat of arms

- Location of Sietland within Cuxhaven district
- Interactive map of Sietland
- Location within Germany Location within Lower Saxony
- Coordinates: 53°44′N 8°55′E
- Country: Germany
- State: Lower Saxony
- District: Cuxhaven
- Founded: 1970
- Disbanded: 2010-12-31
- Subdivisions: 4

Area
  - Total: 143.79 km^{2} (55.52 sq mi)

Population (2009-12-31)
  - Total: 5,449
  - Density: 37.90/km^{2} (98.15/sq mi)
- Time zone: UTC+01:00 (CET)
  - Summer (DST): UTC+02:00 (CEST)
- Website: www.sietland.de

Sietland is a former Samtgemeinde ("collective municipality") in the district of Cuxhaven, in Lower Saxony, Germany. It was situated in the historical Land of Hadeln approx. 20 km southeast of Cuxhaven. Its seat was in the village Ihlienworth. On 1 January 2011 it merged with the Samtgemeinde Hadeln to form the new Samtgemeinde Land Hadeln.

The Samtgemeinde Sietland consisted of the following municipalities:

1. Ihlienworth
2. Odisheim
3. Steinau
4. Wanna
