= Torfschiffswerft Schlussdorf =

Museum of the Schlussdorf Turf Shipyard
- Torfschiffswerft Schlussdorf
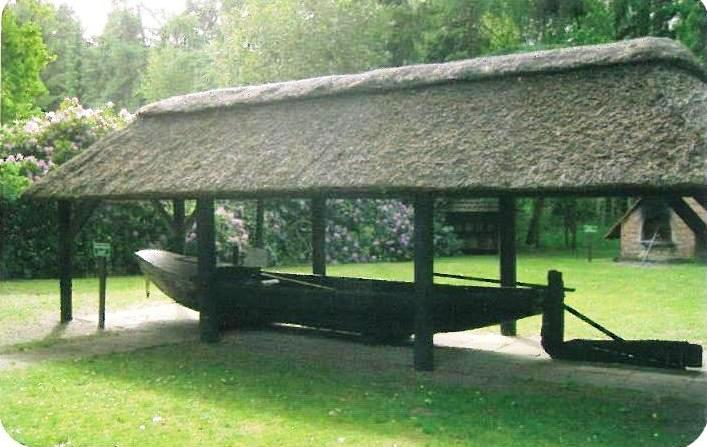
- Outdoor area: Boat shelter with 1/4-Hunt barge

- Location of the museum within Germany Torfschiffswerft Schlussdorf (Germany)
- Former name: Grotheersche Torfschiffswerft
- Established: 13 August 1977; 48 years ago
- Location: Schlussdorfer Str. 22, D - 27726 Schlussdorf, a locality of Worpswede
- Coordinates: 53.23560°N 8.97281°E
- Type: open-air museums, transport museum
- Key holdings: turf boats, tools and devices for peat cutting, for boat building, for farming and for house-keeping
- Visitors: 160,000 (1977–2014)
- Founders: Heimatverein Schlußdorf, then led by Hermann Giere (1920–2016)
- Directors: Siegfried Fest, Horst Flömer and Sonja Melingkat
- Presidents: Karl-Heinz Melingkat; 1993–2014: Dieter Hornig; 1975–1993: Hermann Giere
- Owner: Heimatverein Schlußdorf (i.e. Local Traditions Club)
- Parking: on the spot
- Website: www.torfschiffswerft-museum.de

The Turf Shipyard (German: Torfschiffswerft) in Schlussdorf, Lower Saxony, Germany, is a former boat builder's yard now used as an open-air museum. The yard, operating from 1850 to 1954, was specialised on barges to transport turf, that is dried peat used as fuel. In 1975 the Heimatverein Schlußdorf (i.e. Schlussdorf Traditions Club) started to rescue the dilapidated shipyard buildings and reopened the site as a museum in 1977. The Turf Shipyard is about 3 kilometres (1.9 mi) north of Worpswede's outskirts.

The Turf Shipyard is the only of its kind preserved in Northern Germany. As a museum it is undoubtedly in the front row of Worpswede's tourist sights. Among the attractions of the art colony of Worpswede, the Turf Shipyard museum turned out to be a gem. The visit is especially recommended to people with children, as everything is presented very vividly.

== Bogs settled, peat cut and shipped ==
Following Jürgen Christian Findorff's plans for the inner colonisation in the drained mires of the Teufelsmoor the village of Schlussdorf was founded in 1800 with originally 24 colonist families. Findorff (1720–1792), whom on 20 September 1771 George III of Britain and Hanover had appointed as Mire Commissioner (German: Moorkommissar) for the drainage and colonisation of the Teufelsmoor, included fuel turf sales as the necessary and available financial source for the colonists in their hard initial years.

The colonists sold fuel turf (German: Backtorf) prevailingly in Bremen and cities on the lower Weser, in order to raise money to make a living and build up their farms. By contract with the mire commission each colonist had to commit himself to replace the initial sod roofed A-frame shack by a solid farm building within the span of one year, however, so many failed that the commission already counted the presence of timber as fulfilment of that obligation, and thus some simple mire cottages (German: Moorkate[n]) were still to be found in the 1930s.

As the soil was poor, the farming revenues remained meagre, and their recipients lived in poverty and often suffered from malnutrition and disease such as rickets and tuberculosis. In springtime farmers started to cut peat from a lower peat layer, considered the best for fuel turf. If necessary the farmers compressed the peaty soil before cutting by hours-long barefoot tamping, a procedure called petten in Northern Low Saxon. Then the brick-formed peat pieces were piled up to stacks for drying in the summer sun to become fuel turf, before the deliveries started from autumn till mid-December.

After 1800 turf prices in Bremen soared. In 1830 fuel turf cost Thaler (Thl.) 4 to 8 (about mark [ℳ] 12 to 24) per 1 Hunt, which is 13.567 cubic metres (479.1 cu ft). In his teenage days the Schlussdorf-born Heinrich Schriefer (1847–1912) navigated turf barges to Vegesack and Bremen selling 1 Hunt of fuel turf for Thl. 2 2/3 to 3 (about ℳ 16 to 18), as this author of rustic novels described. Between 1866 and 1884 turf prices per Hunt freely delivered rose from ℳ 60 (in 1866 still Thl. 20 circa) to ℳ 72. Selling fuel turf remained a main source of revenues for mire farmers till the begin of the 20th century, when modern fertilising sharply increased the harvests. Fuel turf experienced a last boom in demand by the end of the Second World War and in the immediate postwar years. For their own requirements some mire farmers continued heating with fuel turf until the late 1960s.

All the 20 villages newly founded between 1751 and 1808 stretch as linear settlements along a ramrod straight causeway thrown up from material dug out from the drainage ditches running parallelly. The intermediate Royal-Electoral Chamber of Hanover (fiscal authority supervising and controlling the royal-electoral demesnes) and the provincial Bremen-Verden government in Stade paid for their part the main causeways in each village.

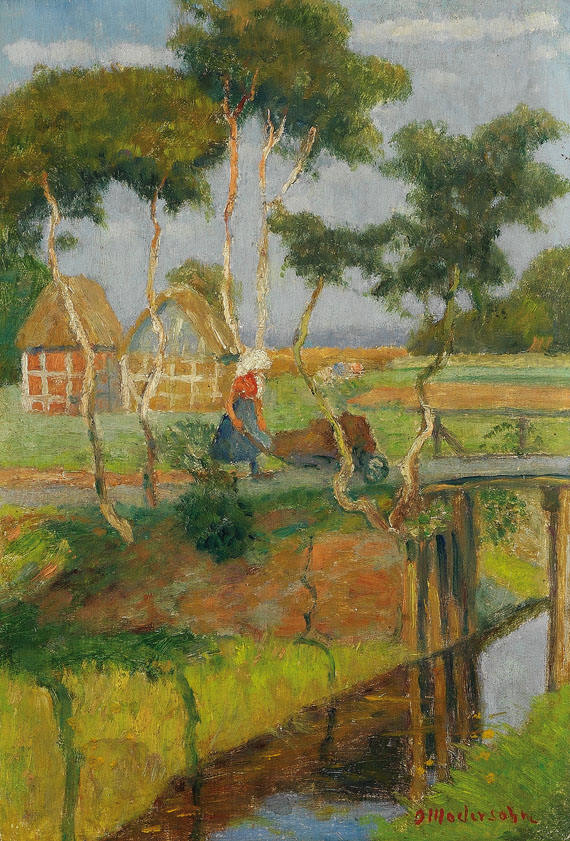
Farmer pushing turf on a wheelbarrow in Mire Bridge, 1905 by Otto Modersohn

The colonists, again, had to maintain them and to build and to maintain connecting causeways (German: Communicationsdämme, i.e. communication dams) between the villages on their own, as well as all the hydraulic installations (drainage ditches, navigable canals, dikes, weirs, and bridges), to which each colonist had to commit in a contract with the mire commission. All royal-electoral causeways were open to everyone for the public good. Such causeways lacked soil compaction and pavement and were thus impassable for wayns and often even for horses, so inhabitants mostly walked them by foot using – if necessary – wheelbarrows for transport.

In rainy seasons or at seasonal floods the ways turned completely impassable, sometimes for days. In the beginning 30 villages in the Teufelsmoor were only connected by watercourses with 20 villages in the eastern mire part linked through the Wörpe and its tributaries, entering the Wümme. Until the regulation of the river Wörpe in 1860 the rather narrower navigable watercourses in its drainage basin only allowed 1/4-Hunt barges, thereafter then 1/2-Hunt barges. Hardly a farmer in the drained mire had a horse, in Schlussdorf e.g. no family had a horse in 1828, they were useless lacking made roads. However, Schlussdorfers had some horned cattle reaching a livestock hardly securing their living only in the second generation. A situation accounted for by the traditional local rhyming saying: Den Eersten sien Dood, den Tweeten sien Nood, den Drütten sien Brood (Northern Low Saxon for: Unto the first his death, unto the second his need, unto the third his bread).

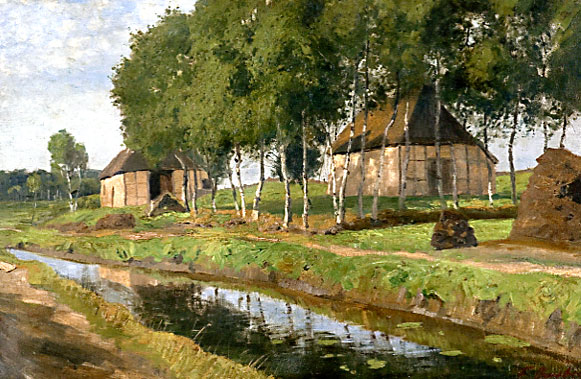
Dug-out material on the left bank of a mire canal in Three Houses, 1895 by Fritz Overbeck

Lacking sufficient travelways the mire colonists also extended drainage ditches to navigability when clearing them, using the dug-out material to raise and repair parallel causeways. Hydraulic engineers and colonists straightened natural rivers and created most of today's watercourses between 1751 and 1799, forming a grid expanding to today's length of 222 kilometres (138 mi) to be maintained and financed by the landowners in the drained mire, combined in today's local water board (a public-law corporation), the Gewässer- und Landschaftspflegeverband Teufelsmoor (or GLV Teufelsmoor). Between 1769 and 1790 Findorff directed the construction of the Oste-Hamme Canal, providing for the northerly connection to Bremervörde and Stade. The mire farmers used barges (German: Torfschiff[e]) with no considerable draught capable to cruise the shallow navigable ditches of the Teufelsmoor mire.

Once crisscrossed by drainage trenches, hill moors – like the Teufelsmoor – do not well hold water, thus, in order to maintain a navigable water level manually openable sluices (N. Low Saxon: Schütt[en]) were installed every 400 metres (1,300 ft) to 500 metres (1,600 ft) in all the watercourses. In order to pass a Schütt it was to be opened board by board, a time-consuming procedure implying water losses. So usually two people manned a barge, one navigating and one opening and closing weirs. In order to balance these losses streams on the geest had to be tapped, provoking disputes with the inhabitants there.

The Schlussdorf-Winkelmoorer Schiffgraben (Schlussdorf-Winkelmoor shipping ditch) between Schlussdorf and Winkelmoor was laid out on expenses of the Royal-Electoral Chamber in 1810, shortly before the French annexation of the Elbe–Weser triangle. The Schlussdorf-Winkelmoorer Schiffgraben measures 1.542 kilometres (0.958 mi) in length and connects via the river Umbeck to the Hamme. Ten sluices regulated its water level which in 1854 were combined in pairs to form chambers similar to locks able to include up to eight turf barges, obliged to pass in queues to reduce water outflow.

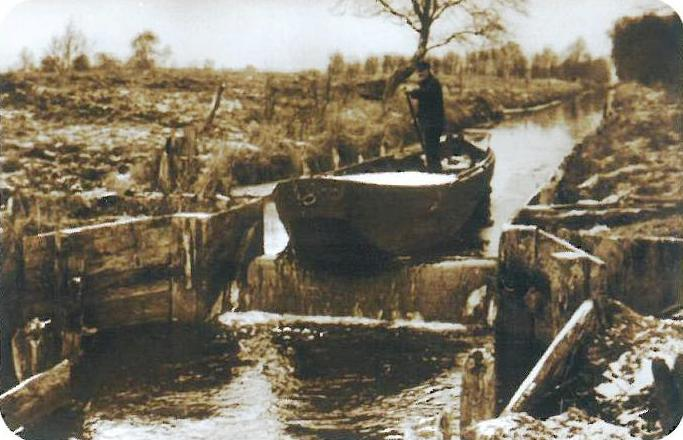
Flap weir while accessed by a turf barge pressing down the weir's leather-enforced blades else upheld by the headwater behind it, early 20th century

Since passing sluices is time-consuming, with – in the 1870s – 1,500 turf barges in the Teufelsmoor making up for 9,000 passages per year at, e.g., the Ritterhude Lock, tinkerers plotted a remedy. The canal steward (German: Kanalvogt) Müller from Wörpedorf invented the Klappstau (flap weir) by 1830. It is a leather flap vertically flexible and horizontally enforced by parallel wooden boards applicated on the downstream side and upheld on the upstream side by the headwater and on the downstream side by guiding lateral edges bent upstream. So when a vessel approaches upstream its bow well sticks out above the upper edge of the concavely bent flap weir and by moving on its sloping underside gently presses down the flap, allowing the vessel to skim over it with the swashing downstream torrent. Moving upstream needs more manpower pushing the vessel's bow against the convexly bent flap weir to press it down against the headwater's counterpressure and then steering the barge against the downstream torrent. However, barges can pass flap weirs without the help of a second person.

Mire Commissioner Claus Witte (1796–1861; 1826–1861 in office) promoted Müller's idea, however, the new practical tool was very expensive, so that it took until 1840 that the first samples got installed in a watercourse at Eickedorf, soon spreading to all navigable watercourses in the Teufelsmoor. In 1856 flap weirs were installed in the Schlussdorf-Winkelmoorer Schiffgraben replacing the previous devices. By straightening the meandering Hamme its course was shortened by half. The southward extension of the old Semkenfahrt by the Semkenfahrtskanal in 1888 and later further on by the Neue Semkenfahrt further shortened the connection between Bremen and the villages north of Worpswede. But navigating on that canals implied dues of three groats for the Semkenfahrt, another three at Höftdeich and six groats at entering Bremen city at the Doventor gate.

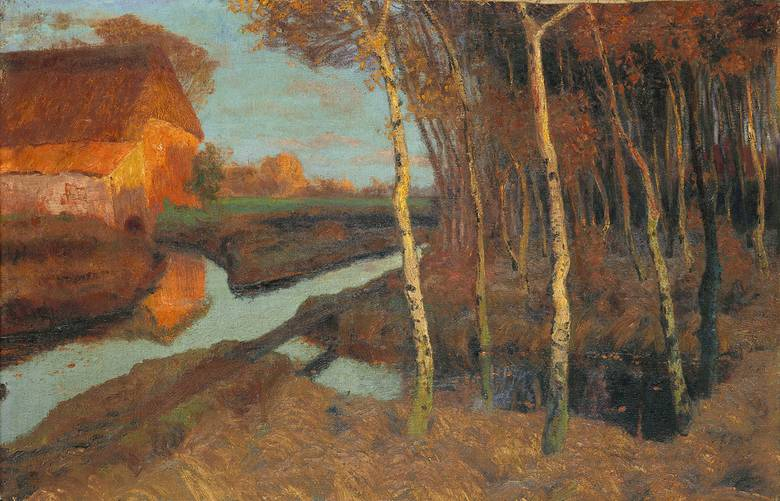
Branch ditch leading to a boat shed in Evening in the Mire, 1895-96 by Fritz Overbeck

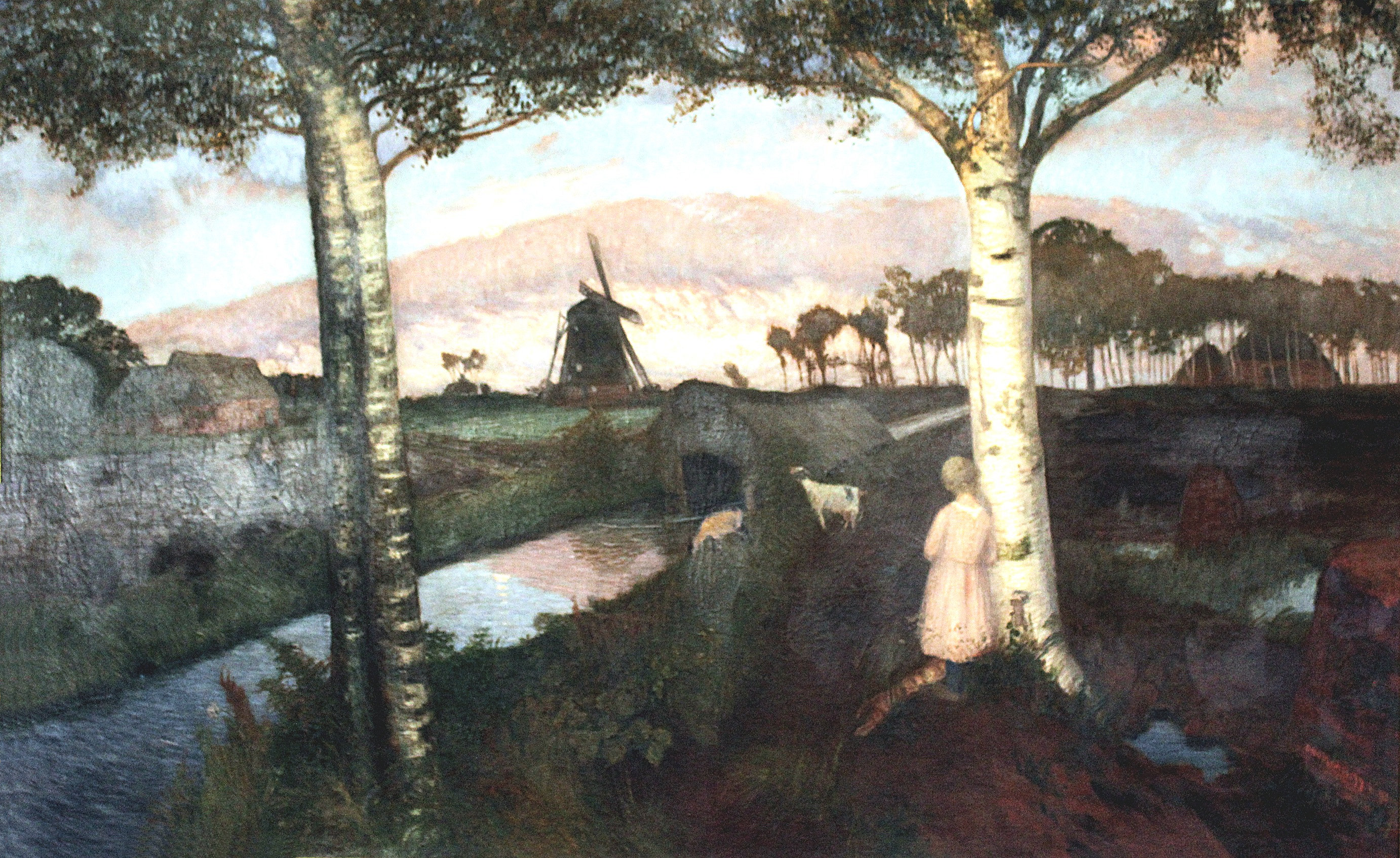
Boat shed on an expanded drainage ditch, continuing narrower behind the shed in Moonrise in the Mire, 1897 by Otto Modersohn

In the Teufelsmoor literally every farming lot is connected to drainage ditches, and the farmers expanded their adjacent ditches to navigable size, or even dug branch ditches to their farmsteads, adding boat sheds where navigability ended. Farmers who could not afford a boat took the services of an Eichenfahrer, a commission shipper from Bremen. Boat sheds mostly disappeared to these days or remain very dilapidated, except of few preserved in museums, such as the Torfschiffswerft in Schlussdorf.

The oldest, and for a long time only made road through the Teufelsmoor, the highway Worpswede-Karlshöfen-Gnarrenburg (today's Lower Saxon L 165), was started in May 1785 by the provincial Bremen-Verden government. Other roads were seasonally so furrowed that pedestrians had to use a side path. Actual paving of causeways only started from 1870 on. Until the end of the First World War causeways had been built to connect all the villages so that many farmers bought for the first time a horse from demobilised army stocks in 1918.

In the 1920s every village paved at least one causeway, usually connecting to the closest paved highway, typically with turf-fired clinker (German: Moorklinker). In the years 1928 and 1929 in Schlussdorf its mayor Diedrich Schnakenberg (1857–1942) propelled paving the first road with clinker, the one to Weyerdeelen-Umbeck, then costing reichsmark (ℛℳ) 210,000, of which the Osterholz district paid one third, while two thirds were personal contributions by the Schlussdorfers. With more and more causeways paved in the Teufelsmoor drainage ditches were put out of navigation. Truck transport replaced canal traffic. In the Great Depression and the early Nazi period more causeways were paved within job creation schemes, with villagers having to feed and lodge the workers in the scheme and provide hand and hitch-up services.

Between 1900 and 1954/1956 the narrow-gauge railway Jan Reiners connected Bremen's Parkbahnhof station with Tarmstedt calling also stations in the Teufelsmoor. Since 1911 the Mire Express railway, since 1978 only operating seasonally, provides its services.

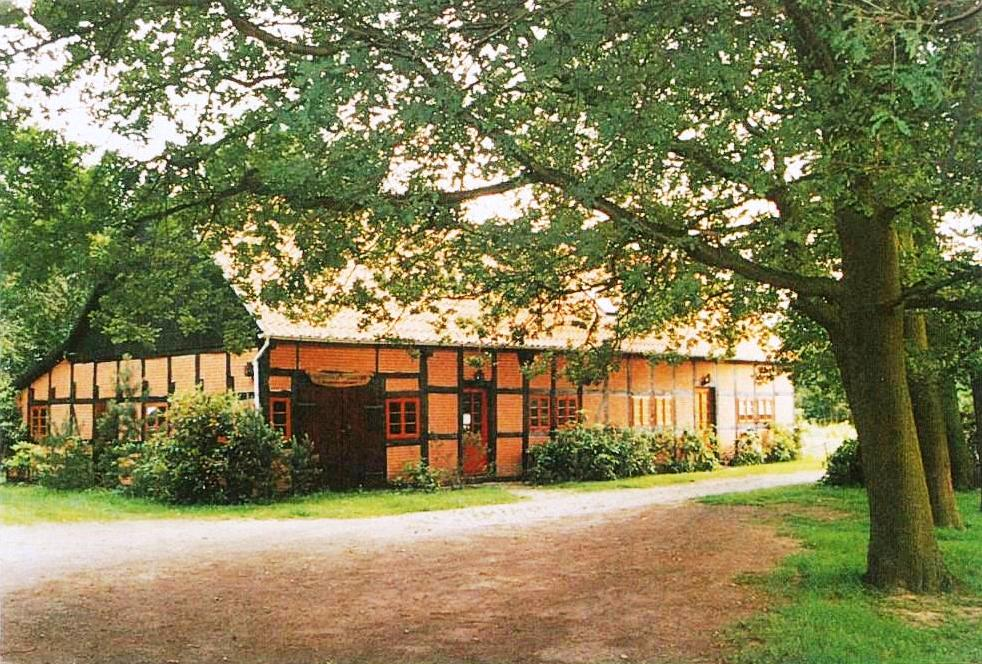
Looking from Northwest towards Grotheer's half-timbered former shipyard building, 1992

== History of the shipyard ==
In 1800 Johann 'Jan' Grotheer, then head of one of the 24 original colonist families, took the land lot Schlussdorf #6, readdressed Schlussdorfer Straße 22 in 1978. The Grotheers replaced their initial cottage by a solid farm building by 1820, and in 1850 Jan Grotheer built a boat builder's yard for his son Cord Hinrich Grotheer (1844–1914), at last led by his grandson Hinrich Grotheer (1871–1957). Boat builders established on mire rivers and turf canals, such as in Moorhausen upon Hamme, Mooringen, Trupermoor (there even two), Überhamm and Weyermoor, with Grotheer's in Schlussdorf having then been the best known in all the Teufelsmoor.

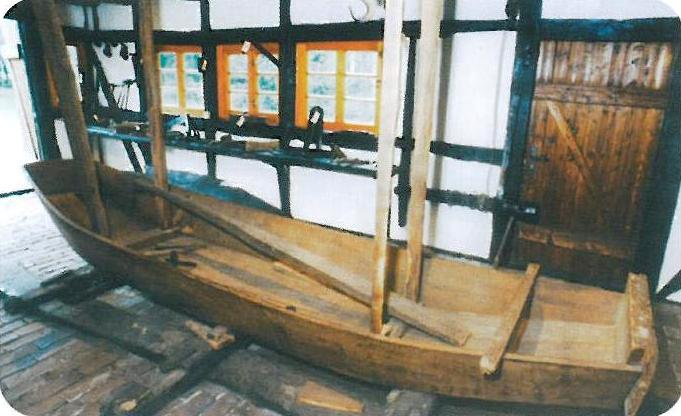
An Entenjäger (a type of passenger boat) inside the shipyard hall, early 1990s

Over three generations the Grotheers launched more than 600 boats within the 104 years of boat building in Schlussdorf. Without constructional drawings they built their barges, each taking about six weeks of actual boat building. Besides turf barges, mostly for freight (such as fuel turf, or hay to be brought from the remote meadows to the barns at the farmsteads, or construction materials) the Grotheers also built locally typical passenger boats, the so-called Entenjäger (i.e. duck hunter).

Grotheers built their boats from long seasoned 10-metre-long (33 ft) oak wood and supplied them with lugsails of 10 square metres (110 sq ft). The barges from Schlussdorf belong to the class of Halbhuntschiffe with a capacity of c. 6 cubic metres (7.8 cu yd) or 50 standard baskets of turf (1/2 a Hunt) each. They could not be bigger because the Grotheers launched their turf boats to the Schlussdorf-Winkelmoorer Schiffgraben which – like many of its kind entering the Hamme or the Wümme – does not allow larger barges.

Boatbuilding was poorly paid. In the early 19th century a 1/2-Hunt barge cost Thl. 80, by its end ℳ 250–300 and ℳ 450 for a full-Hunt barge. In 1934 Heinrich Grabau paid for a 1/2-Hunt barge ℛℳ 450 to Hinrich Grotheer, with a down payment of ℛℳ 100 for wood. In 1950 a full-Hunt barge cost deutschmark (DM) 1,000.

One 1938-built boat from Schlussdorf is preserved in the Osterholz Traditions Museum in Osterholz-Scharmbeck. Another one, built in 1930 in Schlussdorf, was renovated and is now shown in Giehlermoor (a locality of Vollersode). In 1950 the Senate of Bremen ordered the last turf barge in Schlussdorf which Hinrich Grotheer laid down in 1951. The turf barge was completed in 1954 and hauled by low-loader to Bremen where it was used as a working boat on the Weser. Decommissioned in 1954 the shipyard went into rack in the following decades, especially after Hinrich Grotheer's death in 1957.

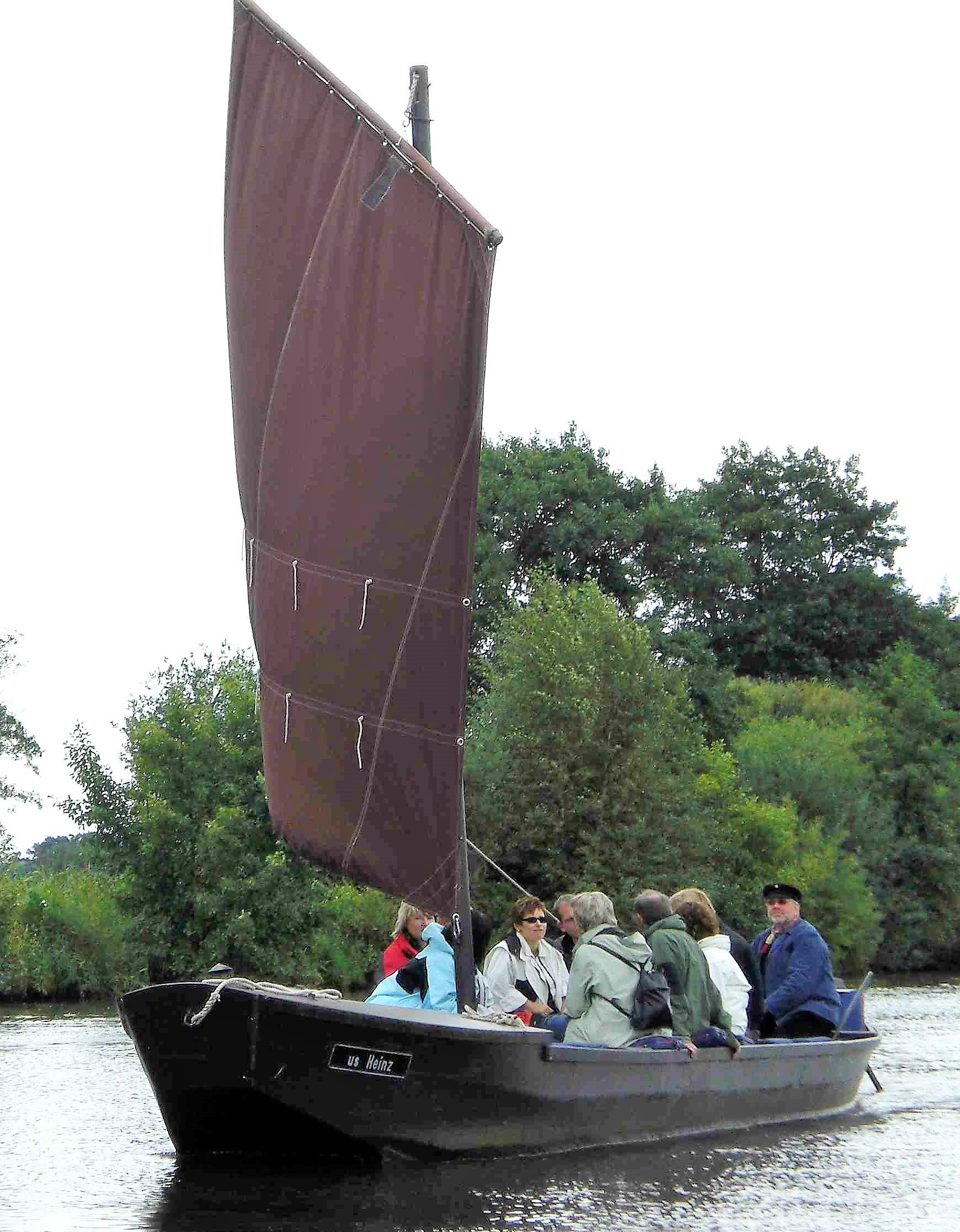
Pitch-black turf barge with puce sail on the Hamme, 2008.

== Turf boats ==
For about 150 years pitch-black turf barges with puce sails were a usual sight in summers and autumns on the watercourses in the Teufelsmoor region. For the shallow mire and drainage watercourses one needs special boats, Torfschiffe. A Torfschiff (literally: turf ship) is a flat-bottomed barge, with similarities to a punt as to construction and propulsion, or a weidling as to material. Torfschiffe can be propelled by poling with quants of 3.6 metres (12 ft) in navigable drainage ditches of 4.5 metres (15 ft) of width or in rivers like Wümme and Lesum, resulting from the former's confluence with the Hamme. However, with wind they can also sail on rivers wide enough. Many watercourses also had lateral towpaths allowing haulage.

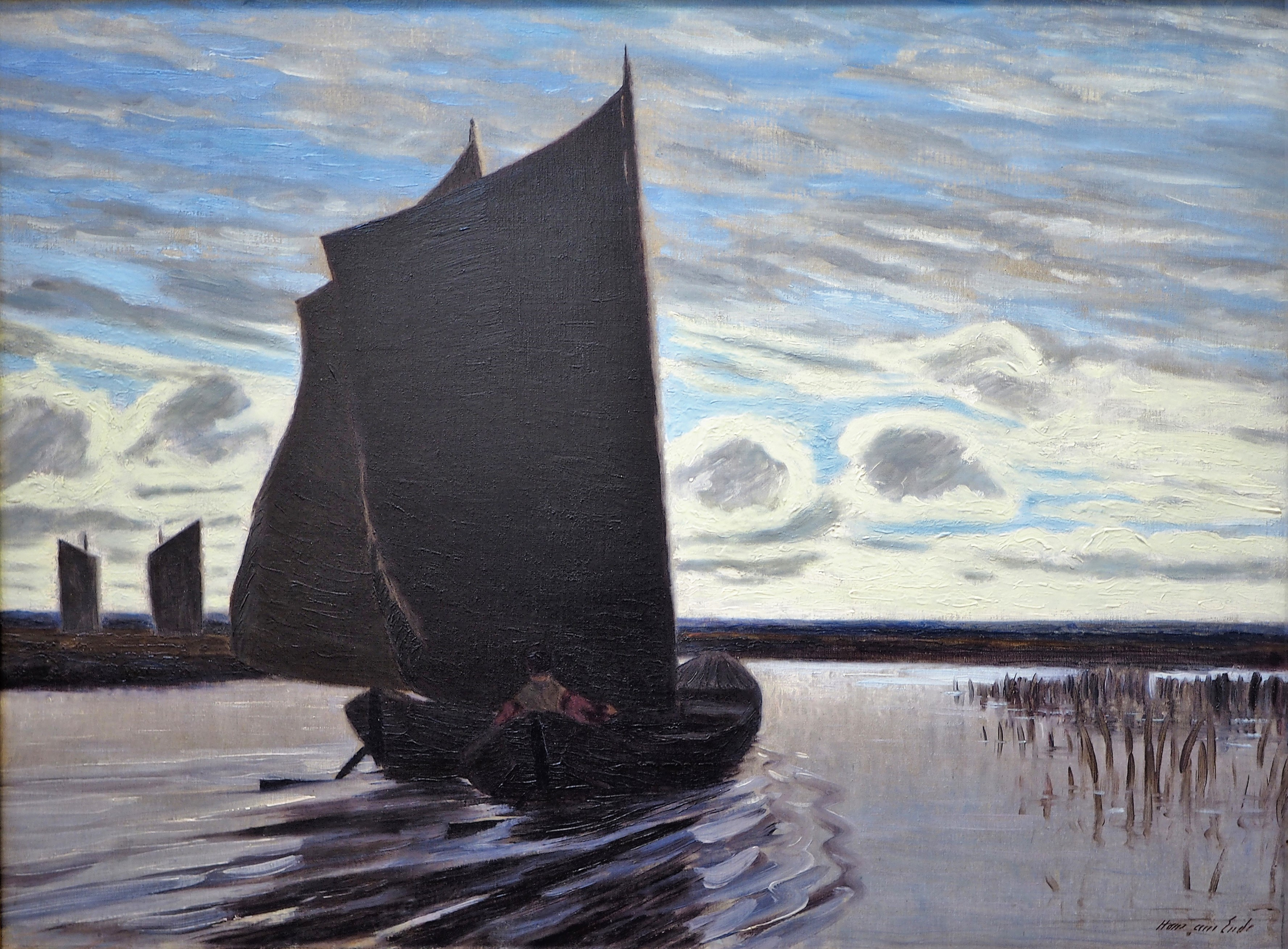
Turf Sailers on the Hamme, c. 1890 by Hans am Ende

The Torfschiff is traditionally constructed from solid wood (oak), seasoned for ten years. The barges, mostly by 10-metre-long (33 ft), were usually built from oaken planks of equal length gained in the geest forests. Shipbuilders originally sawed the floorboards and planks manually from a trunk, later they purchased them sawn from a sawmill and bent them into the required shape. All parts were dowelled with wooden pegs.

Torfschiffe are differentiated by their capacities as Vollhuntschiff (containing up to 1 full Hunt), Halbhuntschiff (up to 1/2 Hunt) or Viertelhuntschiff (up to 1/4 Hunt) with Hunt being a unit of volume for fuel turf (making up 6,480 brick-formed pieces called Soden). The size varieties account for the watercourses' varying widths. Turf barges were delivered fully equipped with sails, mostly from sailmakers in Scharmbeck, with lateral centreboards and quants. When sailing the centreboard serves to stabilise the keelless barge.

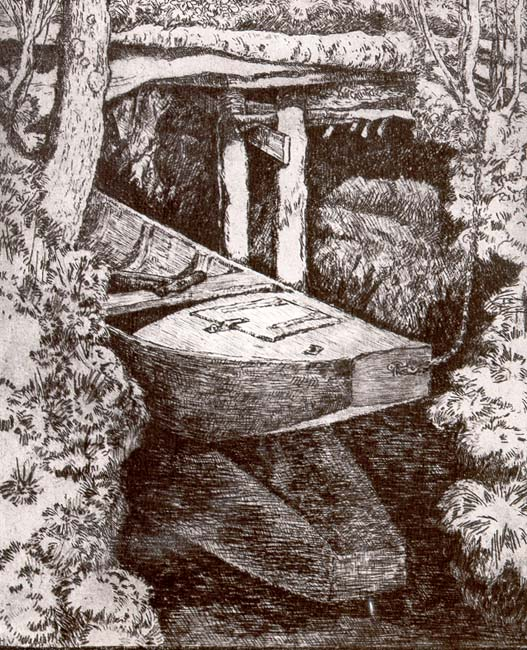
Cabin for overnight stays aboard on tours in Mire Trench and Turf Boat, 1922 by Heinrich Vogeler

Torfschiffe have no keel, stem, or sternpost. Both the bow and the stern are slightly tapering, with a long shallow underside sloping very gently at the front and the back. The bow usually contained a cabin to rest in. Teufelsmoor farmers delivered fuel turf on barges through drainage ditches, downstream the Weser tributaries. Many ventured on the Weser to supply customers even as far as Brake. A boat tour from Schlussdorf to Bremerhaven could last a week, downstream the Hamme via the Ritterhude Lock, continuing with the confluent Wümme as the Lesum, flowing through Burg upon Lesum down to Vegesack where the Lesum enters the Weser. From the northerly Teufelsmoor it took turf barges two days to get to Vegesack. From there it took them another day to reach Bremen city centre which is located upstream the Weser, whereas Brake or Bremerhaven are downstream.

An alternative route, lasting two days and measuring 28 kilometres (17 mi), would lead after passing Ritterhude into the Wümme and on into the Kleine Wümme in order to reach Bremen's turf harbour (German: Torfhafen) in the northeastern suburb Findorff. There, poor women (the so-called Brockelweiber; i.e. wodge totty), granted besides their day-wage the turf which would drop off, were hired to reload the fuel turf to carts. However, until 1860 this route included two slipways (Low Saxon: Övertog) up and down over dikes, difficult to pass for loaded turf barges, using animal and manpower, one at Dammsiel (Schmidts Övertog in the Lower Blockland), charging 2 groats slip toll, and the other across the Wümme-dike at Kuhsiel in the Upper Blockland. Both slipways were replaced by locks in 1865 (Kuhsiel) and 1896 (Dammsiel).

== Museum and Café ==
In 1975 the members of the Heimatverein Schlußdorf (Schlussdorf Traditions Club) decided to make the rescue of the dilapidated shipyard their collaborative project. Hermann Giere, president of the Heimatverein from 1968 to 1993, then persuaded the Grotheer family to lease the shipyard with its 350 square metres (3,800 sq ft) of land by way of emphyteusis for 99 years to the Heimatverein. In 1987 the Heimatverein bought the site from the Grotheer family with financial support by the Worpswede municipality, the Osterholz district and the Landschaftsverband der ehemaligen Herzogtümer Bremen und Verden (association for Stade regional culture, history and economy).

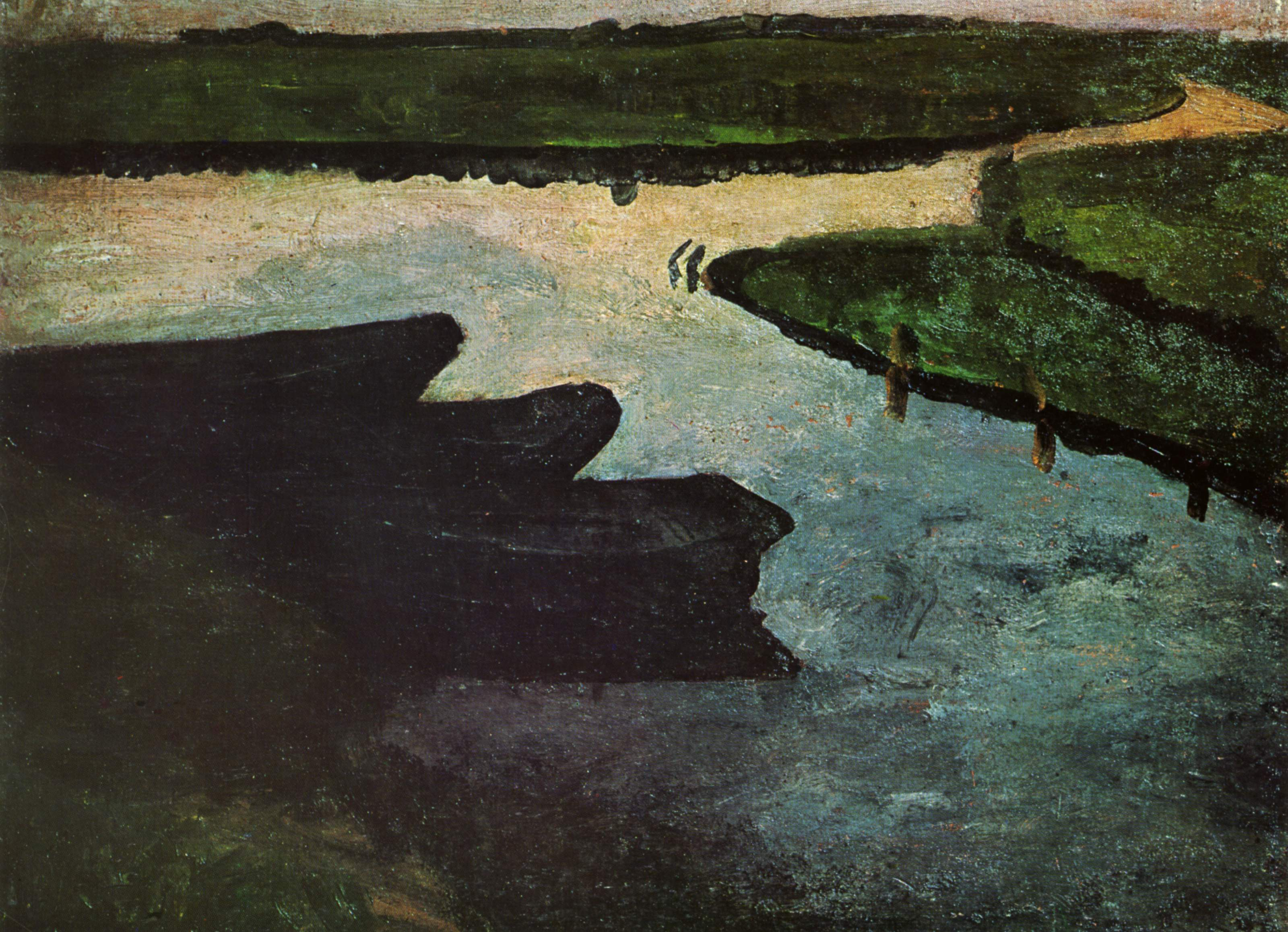
Mire Canal with Turf Barges, c. 1900 by Paula Modersohn-Becker

From 1975 to 1977 immediate structural safeguarding measurements rescued the half-timbered shipyard buildings followed by a thorough renovation. The Worpswede municipality and the Osterholz district bestowed one-off grants of DM 15,000 and 25,000 respectively, whereas the club members added own work – 600 hours of handcraftship, 150 hours of transport services, and 1,800 hours of menial work – amounting altogether to an equivalent of DM 60,000.

The museum opened its doors for visitors on 13 August 1977. In the beginning two members of the Grotheer family worked as guides in the boat builder's yard, Beta Grotheer (died in April 1984) and her son Johann Grotheer (died in 1989). Then Jürgen Hägele-Falkenberg became the guide, while Heinz Kommerau offered turf barge tours on the river Hamme. Guided tours are now in the hands of Siegfried Fest, Horst Flömer, and Sonja Melingkat.

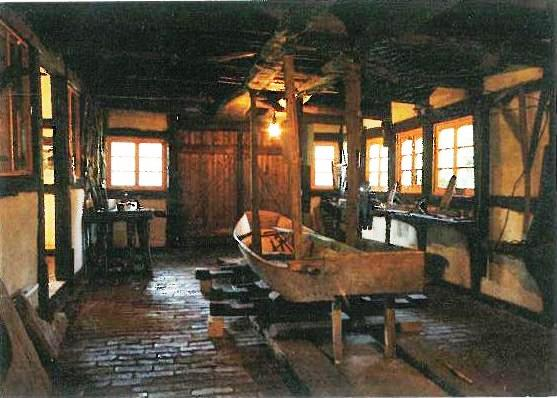
An Entenjäger (a type of passenger boat) inside the shipyard hall, 1980s

The museum comprises the former shipyard building with 45 square metres (480 sq ft) floor area on the ground level and an exhibition hall of 50 square metres (540 sq ft) in the attic. The builder's yard itself, actually a hall in the ground floor, is just big enough to accommodate a barge ten metres long. Today there is a smaller version, a half-finished passenger boat of the type Entenjäger (duck hunter), on a cradle. Primitive-looking tools for boat building, once used by Cord-Hinrich and Hinrich Grotheer are presented on the hall's walls, such as drills, grindstones and saws of various kinds as well as all sorts of tools for woodworking. They give an idea of the simple means by which these watercraft were built.

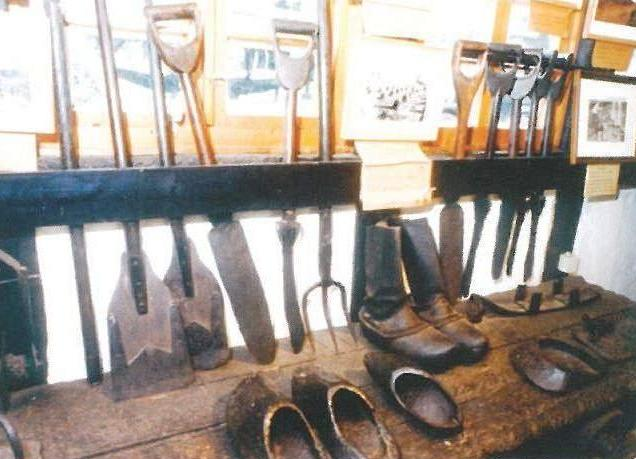
Tool board in the shipyard, 1990s

In the room next to the hall there are original tools and devices for peat cutting, manual agriculture and clog-making were professionally conserved and are shown as exhibits. Also shown are so-called Brettholschen, mire clogs distributing the weight of the person over a larger area so that the person's foot does not bog down completely. Furthermore, there are a small tin stove on which bargemen on tour warmed up their soup, and a traditional wooden butter churn. Tablets, wall charts, and photos give explanations about draining, cultivating and colonising boglands, an exhibition started in 1981 and renewed and extended ever since. In 1981 the Traditions Club began issuing information brochures on the museum and the subjects it covers, such as colonising boglands, peat-cutting, turf barges etc. Since 1984 the museum also published postcards.

The first heating, an iron stove installed in 1980, was replaced by club members in autumn 1991 by an automated filament heating, subsidised by the Worpswede municipality and Landschaftsverband der ehemaligen Herzogtümer Bremen und Verden. The pit toilet, installed in 1981, is long replaced by up-to-date sanitary fittings. The museum hall was also used for cinema shows. On 5 October 1984 the Bremen State Visual Media Centre (German: Landesbildstelle Bremen) and Helmut Oestmann screened his film 'Bauern im Teufelsmoor' (1931–35; Farmers in the Teufelsmoor) in the museum, also showing Hinrich Grotheer at work building a boat. More films followed.

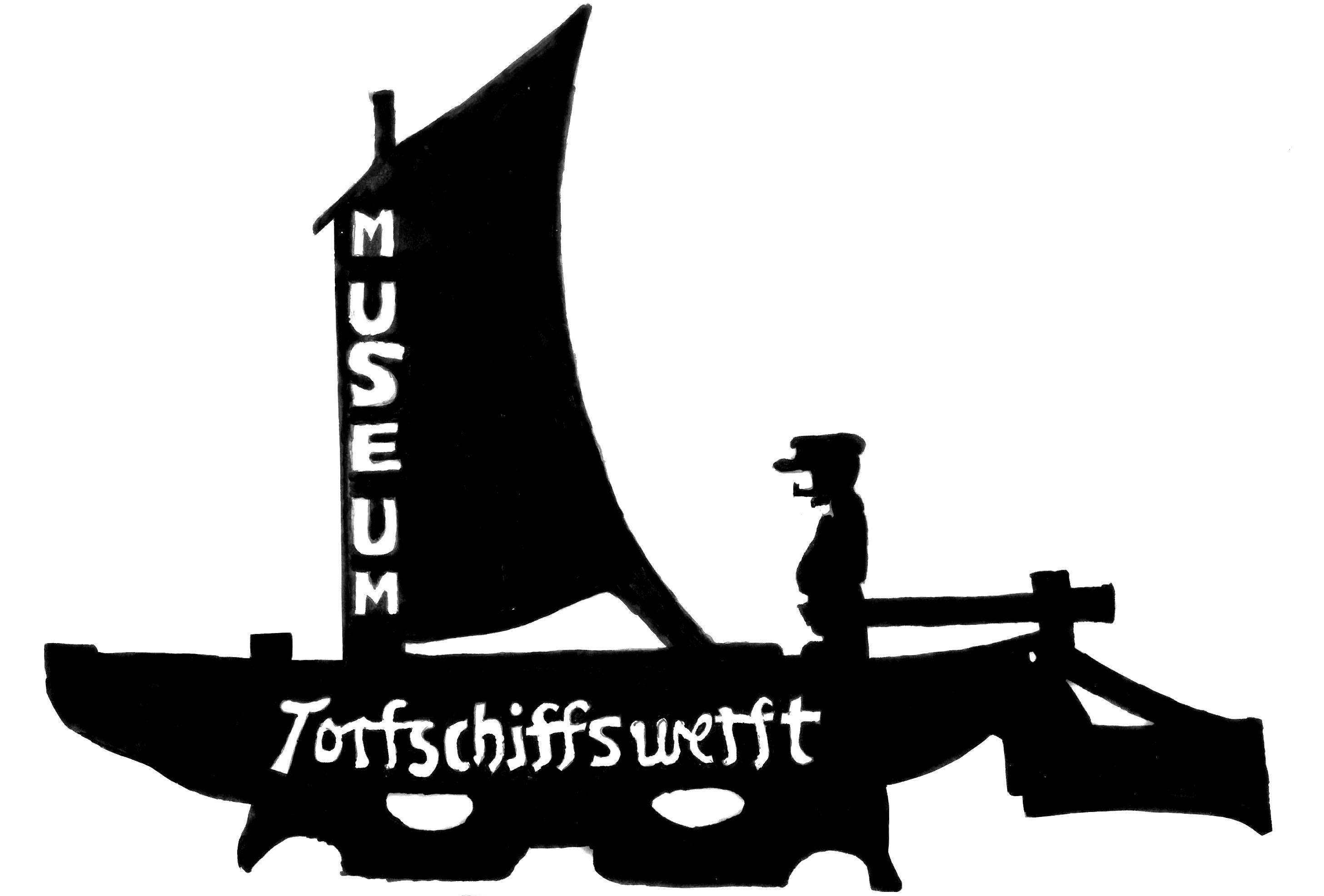
The museum's logo as a waymarker, designed in 1978

=== Outdoor area ===
The museum, surrounded by old oaks which especially in summer invite to linger in the shade, is only a short distance away from the Schlußdorfer Straße. At the end of the driveway, paved with the locally typical peat-fired clinkers and arbored with oaks and rhododendrons, a 1/4-Hunt barge from 1890 welcomes the visitors in front of the shipyard building. Time seems to have stopped there. The outdoor area is enriched by several additional elements, one of them is a model peat-cutting site. In 1978 Johann Murken designed the museum's logo a metal copy of which was installed as waymarker. The logo shows a turf boat with a bargeman nicknamed by townsfolk as Jan von Moor (i.e. John from [the] Mire).

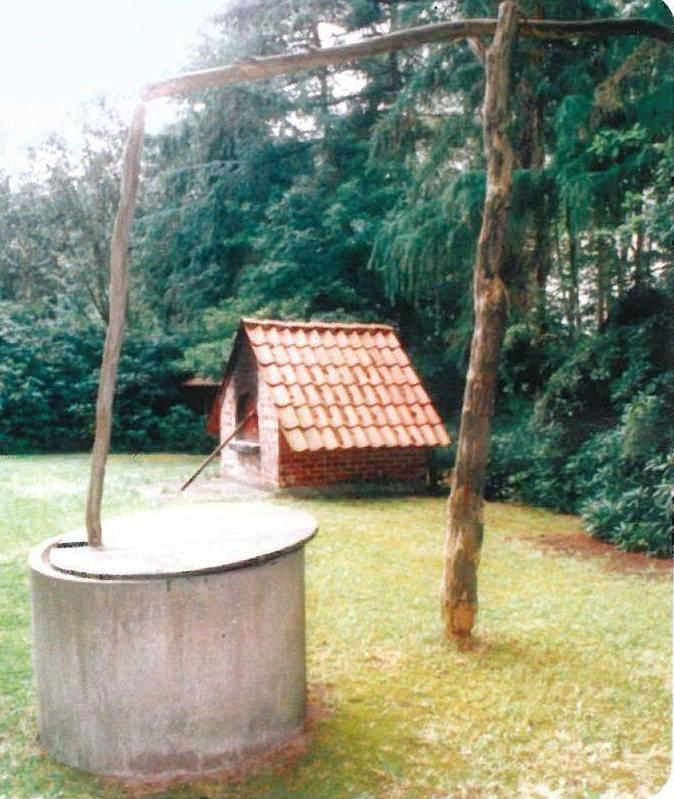
Looking over the draw well towards the oven house, 1990s

In late summer 1979 the Heimatverein built a carport-like shelter for the 1912-built 1/4-Hunt barge which the Wasser- und Bodenverband Teufelsmoor (as the GLV Teufelsmoor was named till 2008) consigned on loan from its collection to the museum. Ernst Soujon thatched the boat shelter in unpaid voluntary work in spring 1991 replacing the previous conventionally modern roof. In 2015 the roof needed a new thatching for approximately € 10,000.

The club members added a draw well in 1980. In 1983 club members redesigned the outdoor area also planting rhododendrons which thrive well in the sour soil of the former mire. Master Mason Georg Geffken created in 100 hours of unpaid voluntary work a replica of a traditional brick oven house completed in December 1985, which became centre for a new tradition, the annual Steinofenfest (i.e. stone oven village fête).

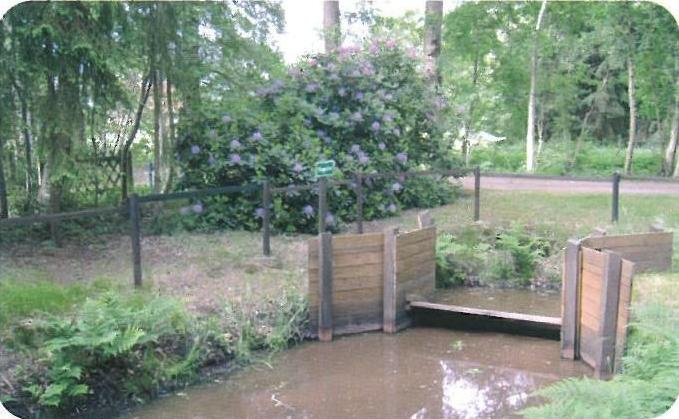
Flap weir of 1988, 1983-planted rhododendrons in the back, 2015

In 1988 the Heimatverein bought an additional piece of land from the Grotheers to extend the museum area by a replica of a flap weir (German: Klappstau) built by the club members Waldemar Hartstock and Heinz Kommerau. In 1989 the outdoor area was enhanced by a laden narrow-gauge turf wagon and traditional skeps.

On 22 March 2015 the Heimatverein opened a café in a former flat in the southern wing of the museum's main building. The café's opening hours parallel those of the museum itself. The café seats more than 20 guests inside, and more on the southward terrace, offering hot and cold drinks as well as home-baked cakes. As Karl-Heinz Melingkat, head of the Heimatverein, explained, opening the café follows the request of many visitors for museum tours enhanced by a culinary offer. The café shall further enhance the attractivity of the museum.

One Sunday in July every year club members and other Schlussdorfers celebrate their village fête, the Steinofenfest (i.e. stone oven fête), around and in the museum. In the oven house in the museum's outdoor area villagers bake traditional regional cakes such as Butterkuchen then offered to the guests. Music and dance enhance the fête, ending with a barbeque.

Visitors (Vts.)
Year	Vts.	±%
1977–1988 annually	3,818	—
1989–1992 annually	5,050	+32.3%
1993–2014 annually	2,276	−54.9%
Numbers are mean sums calculated from attendance sums dividing by the number of years comprised. Source: For 1977–1988 see note For 1989–1992 see footnote For 1993–2014 see footnote

== Attendance ==
The attendance developed encouraging in the first 20 years after opening the museum with more than 4,000 visitors per year, however, by 2015 it had halved. According to another source the number of visitors only slightly declined in the last intervall (4,657 annually). The decline may account for the fact that the museum's exhibition deals with the same subject whereas its counterparts in the heart of Worpswede show altering temporary exhibitions. The small café opened also aims at countering the trend. On Mondays and Tuesdays the museum is closed, however, visits outside the opening times can be agreed beforehand. Entrance fees are moderate.
