= Semkenfahrt =

The Semkenfahrt is part of a canal system in Germany. It was used in former times (about 1750 to 1918) by barges to bring peat from the Teufelsmoor area to the town of Bremen. In the area of Teufelsmoor the peat was dug and dried, and in Bremen it was used for heating purposes.

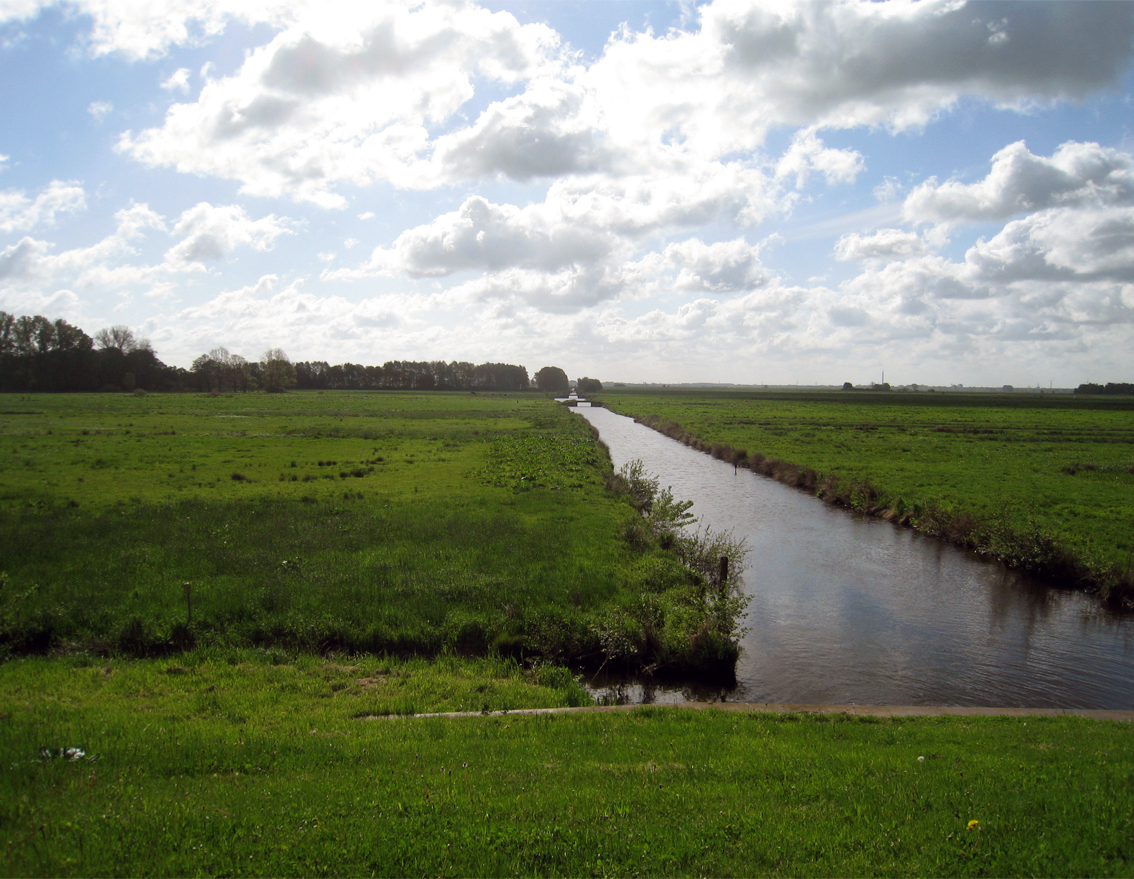
The Neue Semkenfahrt canal in Blockland in Bremen, Germany (photo Till F. Teenck)

Semkenfahrt denotes three parts of the canal system: the Alte Semkenfahrt (= Old Semkenfahrt), the Semkenfahrtkanal (= Semkenfahrt canal), and the Neue Semkenfahrt (= New Semkenfahrt). The word Semkenfahrt originated from Semken, the surname of a family who gave the land to build the canal, and Fahrt which means a navigable channel in the nautical sense.

== History of the Semkenfahrt ==
With a barge carrying peat from Worpswede bound for Bremen, a skipper had to use the rivers Hamme, Lesum and Wümme. The journey took about three to four days. In the year 1754 a project was started to connect the newly founded village of Tüschendorf with the river Hamme. The canal, called Alte Semkenfahrt, had to make an arc to pass the hill of Weyerberg, then joining the river Hamme.

While the peat barges were in the Semkenfahrt they had to be hauled. On reaching the river Hamme, if the wind came from an easterly direction, the skipper could use sail. But in North Germany the wind comes mostly from the west, so for the most part the skipper could set the sails only on the way back, when the barges were empty. On the way to Bremen they mostly had to punt or to scull.

The peat barge traffic reached its peak at the end of the 19th century. For example, in the year 1880, 25,000 shiploads reached Bremen. About 5,000 to 6,000 of these shiploads used the Semkenfahrt. The cargo was in total approximately 30,000 to 36,000 cubic meters in volume.

== Alte Semkenfahrt - Old Semkenfahrt ==
(Start: 53°14′3.1″N 9°1′11.5″E; End: 53°13′6.36″N 8°52′4.82″E)

In 1754 the Alte Semkenfahrt was dug, beginning at the village of Tüschendorf, and passing the villages of Adolphsdorf, Otterstein, Mooringen, Worpheim, and Waakhausen, and then joining the river Hamme. Today only the part from Waakhausen to the Hamme can be used by canoes. The remaining parts are now too small for canoes. Today the Semkenfahrt between Waakhausen and the river Hamme looks like this.

== Semkenfahrtkanal - Semkenfahrt canal ==
(Start: 53°11′36.92″N 8°54′20.54″E; End: 53°8′51.62″N 8°50′43.32″E)

This part of the Semkenfahrt was established in 1888. It starts at the "Alte Semkenfahrt" in Worpheim and leads directly to the river Wümme. It reaches the Wümme at the inn "Zur Schleuse" in the village of Truperdeich. "Zur Schleuse" means a lock in the nautical sense, and the inn is thus named because it is located close to the lock by which the barges left the Semkenfahrt and came into the river Wümme. The lock was necessary because the river Wümme has a dike to suppress the influence of the tide. This part of the Semkenfahrt very much shortens the route.

== Neue Semkenfahrt - New Semkenfahrt ==
(Start: 53°8′40.38″N 8°50′47.11″E; End: 53°7′1″N 8°49′3″E)

This part was established after 1888. At first it was named Neuer Torfkanal. This part starts on the south bank of the river Wümme at the Gartelmann's Gasthof inn.

The river Wümme is protected by a dike. Until 1902 there was no lock available to pass the dike, and the barges had to pass the dike by a slip mechanism, driven by a manually operated winch.

After the barges left the Neue Semkenfahrt they came into the Torfkanal and then it was only a short way to the destination, the Torfhafen (harbour for peat). The economic importance of the peat traffic at that time is shown by the length of the quay: 1 km (approximately 0.6 miles).
