= Breites Wasser =

Lake in Lower Saxony, Germany

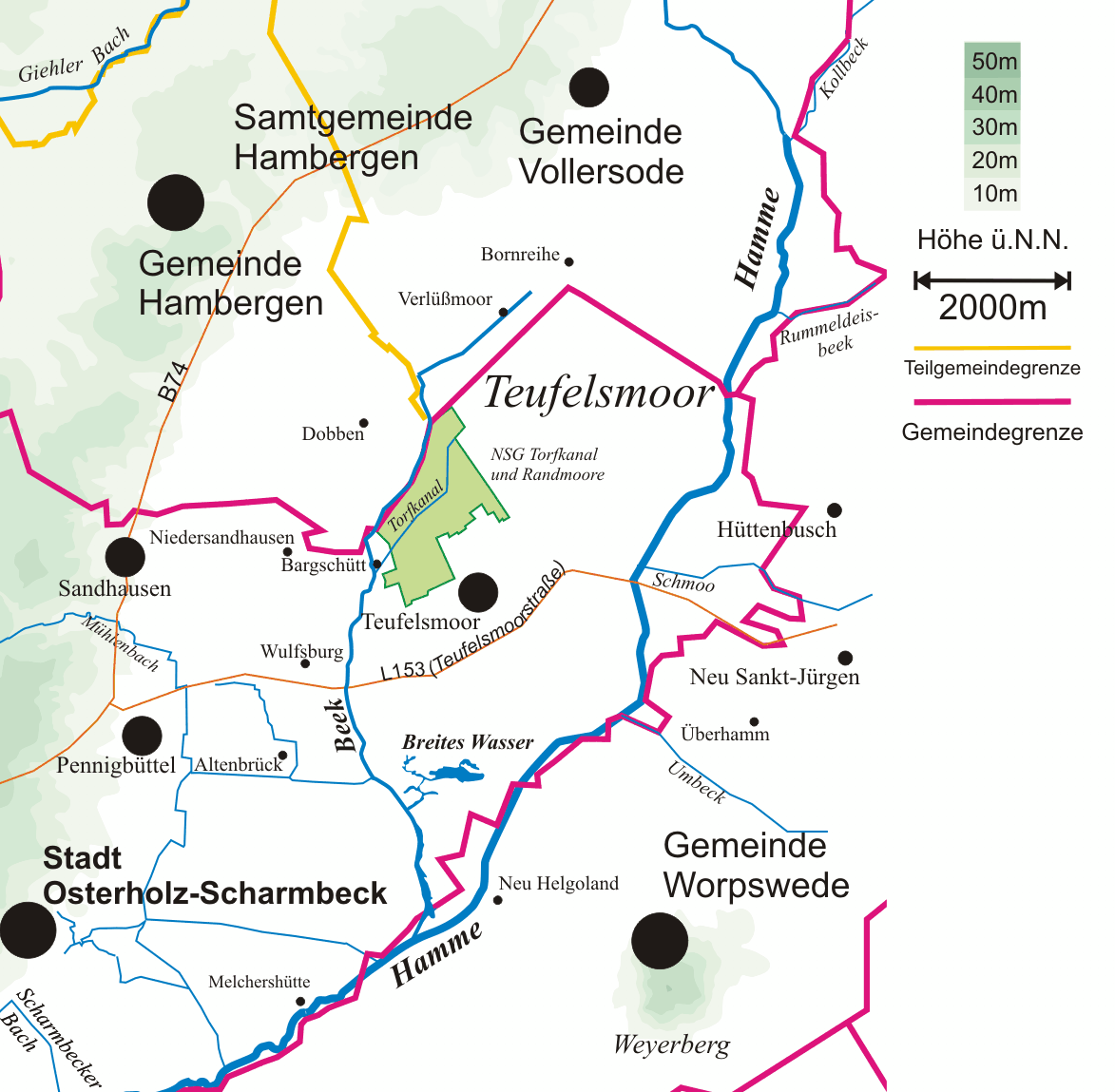

- Location within Lower Saxony
- Location: Osterholz-Scharmbeck, Lower Saxony, Germany
- Coordinates: 53°14′30″N 8°52′54″E
- Primary outflows: → Beek

The Breites Wasser is a lake in the borough of Osterholz-Scharmbeck in the German state of Lower Saxony on the terrain of the Teufelsmoor.

A nature reserve of the same name lies around the lake between Worpswede and the village of Teufelsmoor. The lake is situated at the confluence of the Beek and the Hamme about 2 km downstream of Beek.

The many ox-bows of the streams and small irregular ponds with boggy shores, the so-called Blänken form a wetland triangle (feuchtes Dreieck), which constantly changes its appearance due to the variations in water levels.

Many rare birds breed in the area and there are also colonies of gulls. In autumn and spring quite a few migratory birds rest here en route to their destinations.

Several years ago a large number of paths were laid out for walkers.

== See also ==
- List of lakes in Germany

== Sources ==
- Hans-Gerhard Kulp: Der Weyerberg und das Teufelsmoor - ein landschaftsökologischer Führer. Hrsg. Biologische Station Osterholz, Verlag M.Simmering Lilienthal
- Wendula Dahle (Hg.): Im Land der Moore und Deiche. Ausflüge links und rechts der Weser. Ein Reise- und Lesebuch. Edition Temmen, 5. Aufl. 2005, ISBN 3-86108-466-X
