= Wörpe =

River in Germany

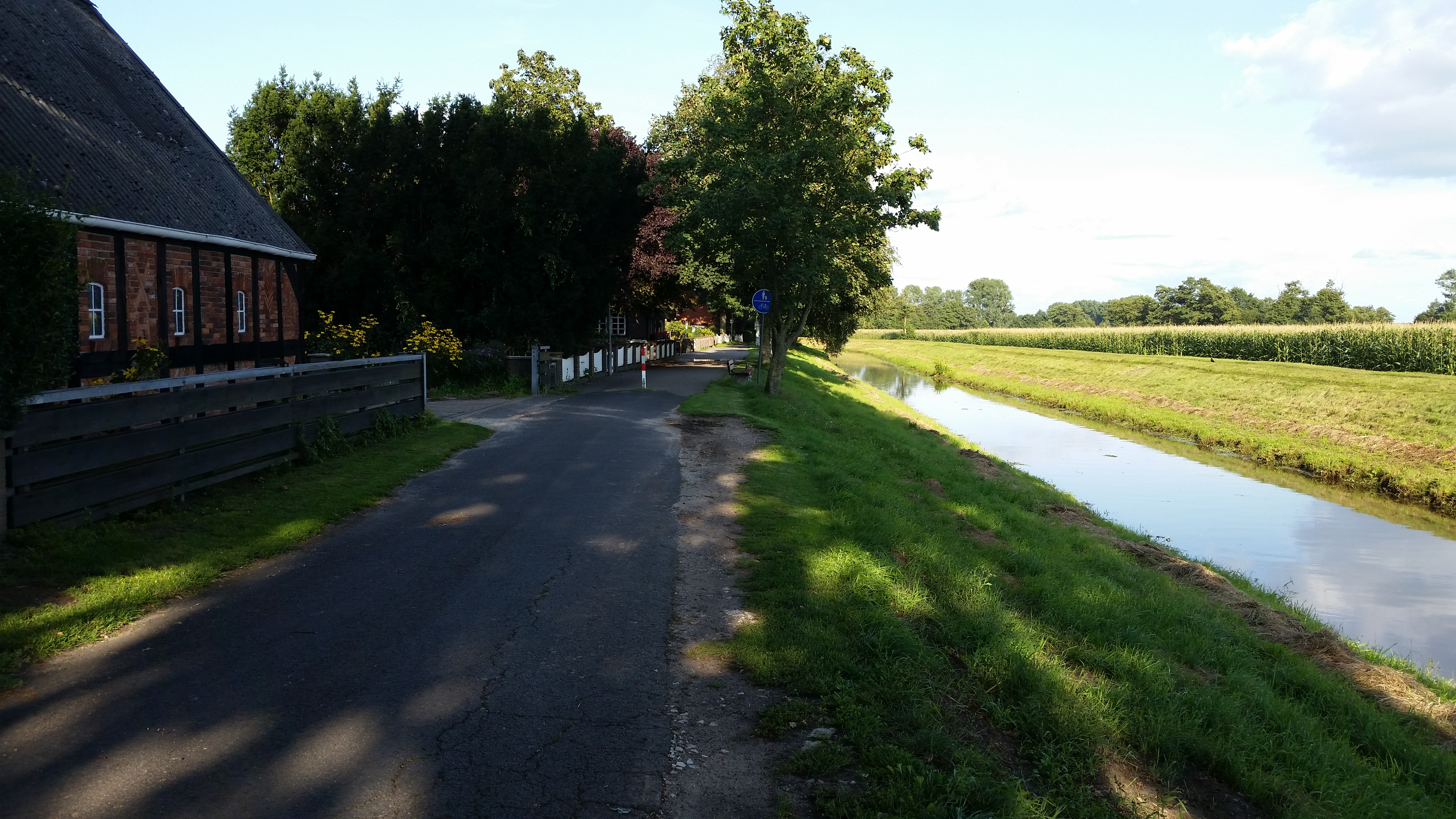
- The Wörpe in Lilienthal

Location
- Country: Germany
- State: Lower Saxony

Physical characteristics
- Mouth
  - location: Wümme
  - coordinates: 53°08′04″N 8°53′51″E
- Length: 29.4 km (18.3 mi)

Basin features
- Progression: Wümme→ Lesum→ Weser→ North Sea

Wörpe is a river in the northern part of the state of Lower Saxony in Germany, a tributary of the Wümme.

The source of the Wörpe is near Steinfeld (a district of Bülstedt) about 10 kilometres (6.2 mi) southwest of Zeven. From there the Wörpe flows through Wilstedt and Grasberg before finally discharging into the Wümme near Lilienthal. The course of the Wörpe was artificially changed in the past. Originally it ran through the Truper Blänken and entered the Wümme near Hof Gehrden. It was first re-routed between 1826 and 1864 in order to improve the passage of peat barges.

== See also ==
- List of rivers of Lower Saxony
