= Teufelsmoor =

Moorland region near Bremen, Germany

Coordinates: 53.2833°N 8.9000°E

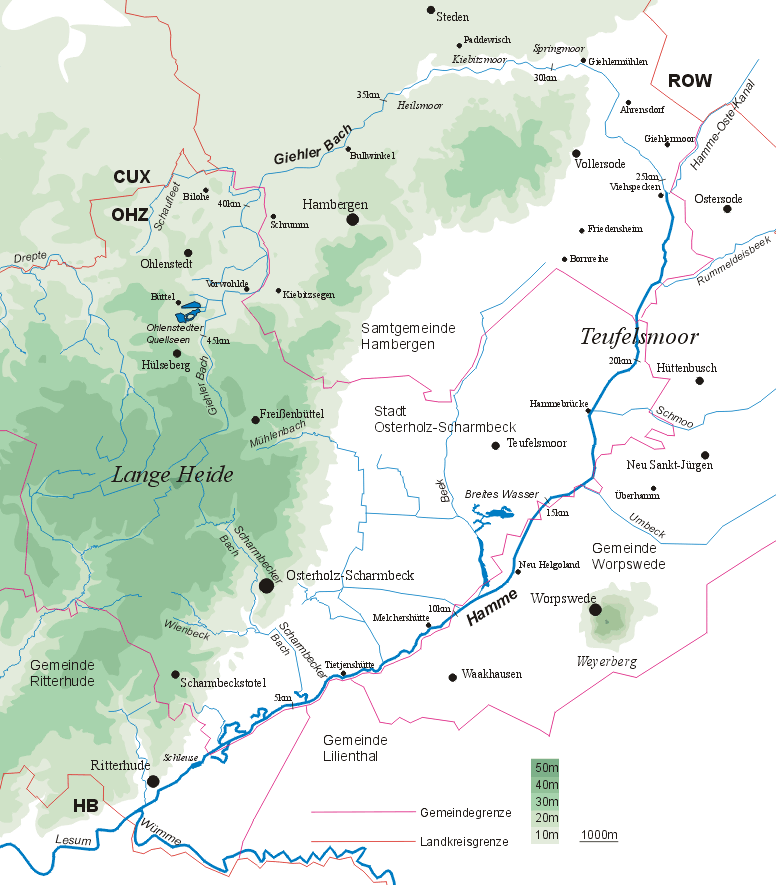
The Teufelsmoor in relation to its main drainage system, the River Hamme

The Teufelsmoor is a region of bog and moorland north of Bremen, Germany. It forms a large part of the district of Osterholz, and extends into the neighbouring districts of Rotenburg (Gnarrenburg municipality).

== Geography ==
The depression is drained by the rivers Hamme, Wümme and Wörpe. The Teufelsmoor extends over an area of about 500 square kilometres (190 sq mi) and is bordered in the west by the Wesermünde Geest and in the east by the Zeven Geest. The eponymous Teufelsmoor itself is an ombrotrophic raised bog that becomes a fen in the vicinity of the streams that drain it. It is one of the largest contiguous areas of bog in northwest Germany. Its largest extent is about 20 by 20 km. The oldest parts of the terrain in Grasberg have layers of peat eleven metres deep or more. In the centre of the moor is the Worpswede artists' colony, made famous by many landscape artists, which is near the sandy hill of the Weyerberg. Also well-known is the 'moor metropolis' of Gnarrenburg in the heart of the Teufelsmoor.

The name "Teufelsmoor" does not mean "devil's bog" or "devil's moor" as a literal translation would suggest. It is actually derived from doofes Moor (Low Saxon: doof; English: deaf), where doof means "unfertile", "less fertile " or "dead" and moor means "bog" or "moor". Large parts of the Teufelsmoor area consist of raised bog peat which is formed from sphagnum moss. Hence the reason why it is not very fertile.

== History ==
The outer edges of the Teufelsmoor were first settled in the 17th and 18th centuries. Around 1750 the colonisation of the entire moor began, led by the moor's commissioner, Jürgen Christian Findorff. The settlers were simple farmhands and maids from the surrounding area, who were attracted by the prospect of having their own property and being freed from taxes and military service. Until well into the 20th century the living conditions in these moor colonies were anything other than quaint or attractive. An impression of the very poor circumstances is given by the Low Saxon saying "Den Eersten sien Dood, den Tweeten sien Noot, den Drüdden sien Broot" (translates as something like "The first gets death, the second gets misery, the third gets bread."). Life expectancy in the dark, damp bog dwellings was short and the moor's soils were unsuited to farming.

An extensive network of drainage channels was created, the main drainage ditches being built to act simultaneously as canals for boats. At that time massive inroads were made into the environment and millions of cubic metres of peat were cut. The peat was sold for heating fuel and shipped to Bremen using peat barges, such as those built in the yard in Schlussdorf. The embankments running alongside these canals were used by burlaks to haul the barges and also opened up the long-street villages (Straßendorf) following the practice in the fen (Fehn) regions. From the embankments the narrow and very long strips of land (Hufen) that ran out into the moor were farmed. Even today these patterns of settlement (of the linear village or Reihendorf) can be seen in many parts of the area around the villages of Grasberg and Worpswede.

By harvesting the layers of peat and draining the land the climatic conditions of the entire area were changed considerably. By the end of the 19th century the keeping of dairy cattle had spread to the area. In Bremen the use of peat for heating was banned because on many winter days the air pollution it caused had become unbearable. Coal, with its greater energy density, superseded peat. Right into the 1980s and 1990s, however, there was continued destruction of the moor. Major 'melioration' measures such as draining, deep ploughing (Tiefumbruch) and river regulation were supposed to increase the productivity of agriculture and even enabled arable farming. Intensive farming methods were used to grow maize as an animal feedstuff. These measures had been supported since the middle of the 20th century by various national and European subsidy programmes. This went so far that ditches dried out in summer, heath fires broke out and, during sustained periods of drought, the land was artificially watered.

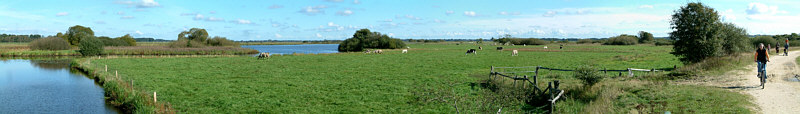
The Teufelsmoor

In the 1990s a major rethink began. By leaving the land to regenerate and by reflooding it, attempts have been made to preserve the original landscape, although the moor in its original state no longer exists. Even those bogs that are still intact - like the Günnemoor - continue to be denuded by industrial peat cutting. Remnants (of peat mounds not peat cuttings) are still visible in the landscape, but their renaturalisation is difficult due to their elevation. The dry conditions encourage the mineralisation of the peat layers and enable woods to develop. In the meantime many small temporary structures have appeared on these areas.

== Situation today ==
Meanwhile, the Teufelsmoor has become part of the commuter belt for the city of Bremen, and its settlements are growing due to the shortage of building land and the influx of new inhabitants. The history of the Teufelsmoor is thus a good example of the cultural activities of mankind and his will to survive but also of the influences and consequences of this activity. The history of the land and its inhabitants was filmed in the 1982 TV series Teufelsmoor produced by Radio Bremen. This portrays the life of several generations of the Kehdings, a fictional farming family, from the initial time of land reclamation to the end of the 20th century. The Teufelsmoor is also well-known from numerous TV programmes such as the recent murder mystery starring Maria Furtwängler, part of the long-running Tatort series.

== See also ==
- Teufelsmoor, part of the borough of Osterholz-Scharmbeck
- Moor Express
- Teufelsmoor Sword
- Teufelsmoor peat barges
- Semkenfahrt

== Sources ==
- Ernst Andreas Friedrich, Naturdenkmale Niedersachsens, Hanover: Landbuch-Verlag, 1980, ISBN 3-7842-0227-6
