= Oste-Hamme Canal =

Canal in Germany

Oste-Hamme-Kanal
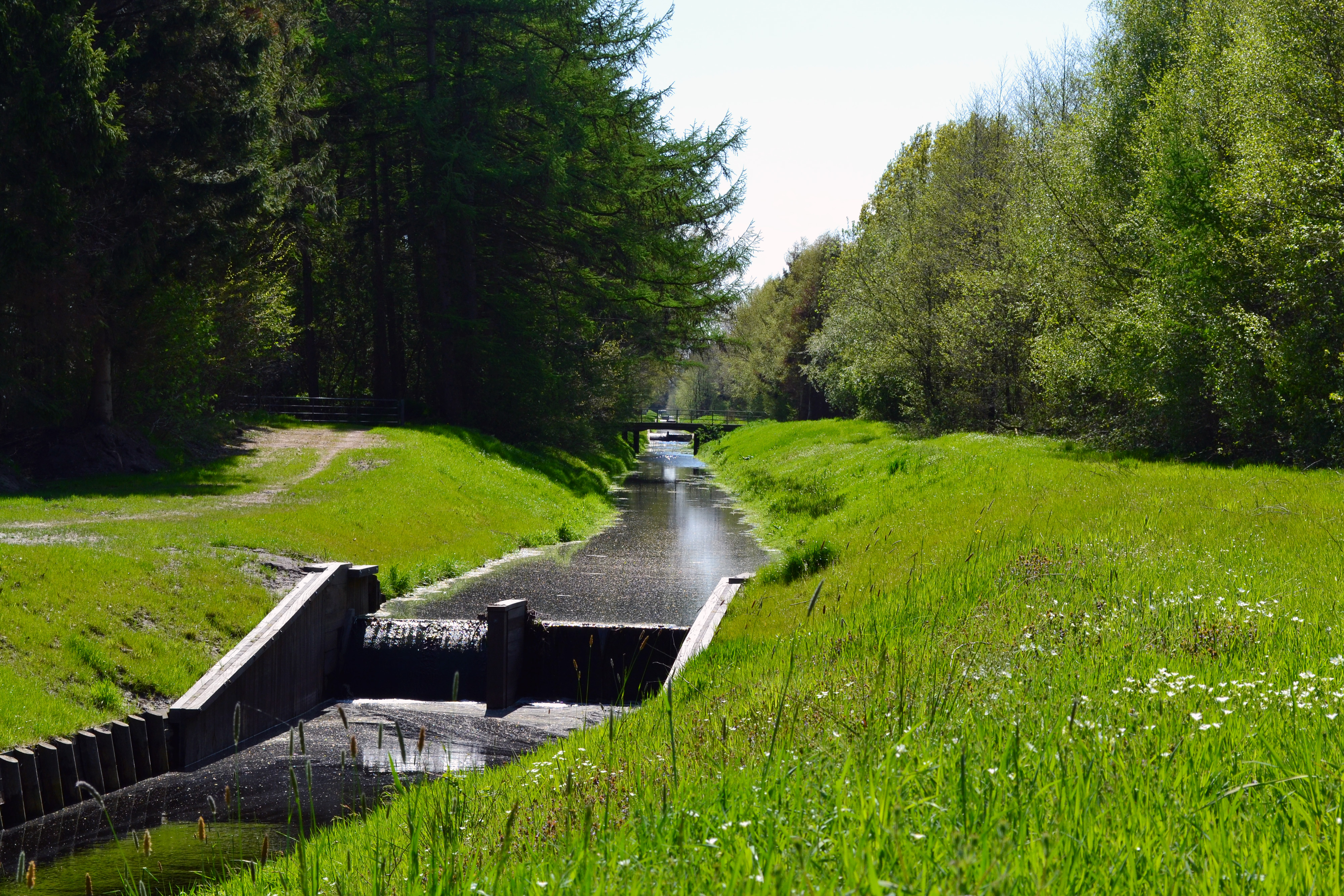
- Oste-Hamme-Kanal in Spreckens with weir

Location
- State: Lower Saxony, Germany

Physical characteristics
- Source
  - location: "Kollbeck" at the mouth of the river Hamme
  - coordinates: 53°20′17″N 8°58′21″E
  - elevation: about 7 m above sea level (NN)
- Mouth
  - location: Near Spreckens in the Oste.
  - coordinates: 53°26′55″N 9°07′07″E
  - elevation: about 6 m above sea level (NN)
- Length: 19 km

Basin features
- Progression: Oste → Elbe
- River system: Oste
- Landmarks: Small towns: Spreckens, Fahrendorf, Klenkendorf, Findorf, Ostersode
- Navigable: From the source to the mouth water hike is by flap sluice possible.
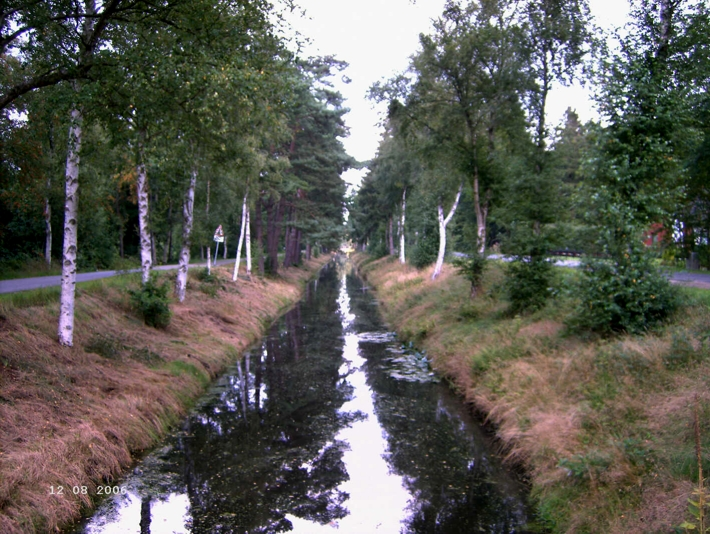
- The Oste-Hamme Canal near Findorf

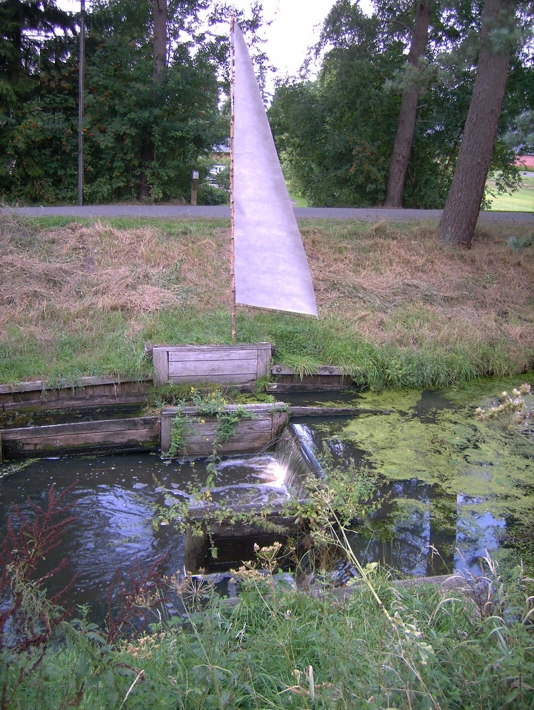
Flap gates (Klappstau) on the Oste-Hamme Canal near Findorf

The Oste-Hamme Canal or Hamme-Oste Canal is a canal in north Germany, that links the rivers Oste and Hamme. It runs from the Oste near Spreckens four kilometres above Bremervörde through the former Teufelsmoor ("Devil's Moor") and Gnarrenburg, until it reaches the Hamme near Viehspecken. The part of the canal near its mouth into the Hamme is also known as Kollbeck.

== History ==
The canal was built between 1769 and 1790 by Jürgen Christian Findorff and was used to drain the Teufelsmoor and to transport freight (mainly peat to Bremen and Hamburg) in small barges (Bullen). Its long construction time was due to the difficulties caused by the soft peat soil which repeatedly collapsed and meant that the channel had to be re-excavated. From the 1860s numerous flap gates (Klappstaue) and double sluice gates were installed, that made it easier for the peat barges, such as those built in the yard in Schlussdorf.

== Significance as a transport route ==
The canal initially formed the only inland water link between the Elbe and Weser. It is 19 kilometres (12 mi) long, has a bed width of four metres and a water surface width of six metres. It is 0,9 metres deep. Today the canal is overgrown and no longer navigable. Nevertheless, because the flap gates are maintained it is possible to walk the route.
