= Blockland, Bremen =

Coordinates: 53°08′35″N 08°48′22″E

red = Blockland in the territory of Bremen City reddish grey = other parts of the Western district

Blockland is a landscape and nowadays a borough of Bremen, Germany. It is part of the Western municipal district and covers an area of 30.3 km^{2}.

== Geography ==
The Blockland is part of the marshes of the Hamme, a tributary of the Weser River, and the Wümme (its main source), both of which are tidal rivers. The average elevation is 1 meter above sea level. Without the dikes along the Hamme and the Wümme, it would be flooded twice a day.

Since its cultivation in the 12th century, the Blockland is drained by a network of parallel trenches which cut the area into blocks, giving the area its name.

== Population and landuse ==
The density of population is quite low, 14 inhabitants per square kilometre. The settlements are concentrated along the dike. Most of the land use is Greenland economy of pastures and meadows.

For the inhabitants of Bremen, the Blockland is an important leisure resort. Cycling, hiking and skating on the small roads at the dikes and along Kleine Wümme, an affluent of the Wümme, are popular activities. The Kleine Wümme and the limiting waterways of Wümme and Kuhgraben are used for paddling. And if there is enough frost, the ancient navigation canal of Semkenfahrt becomes a natural ice-rink.

The garbage dump of Bremen City, called Blockland-Deponie, is situated just outside the political Blockland in the territory of the borough of Walle.

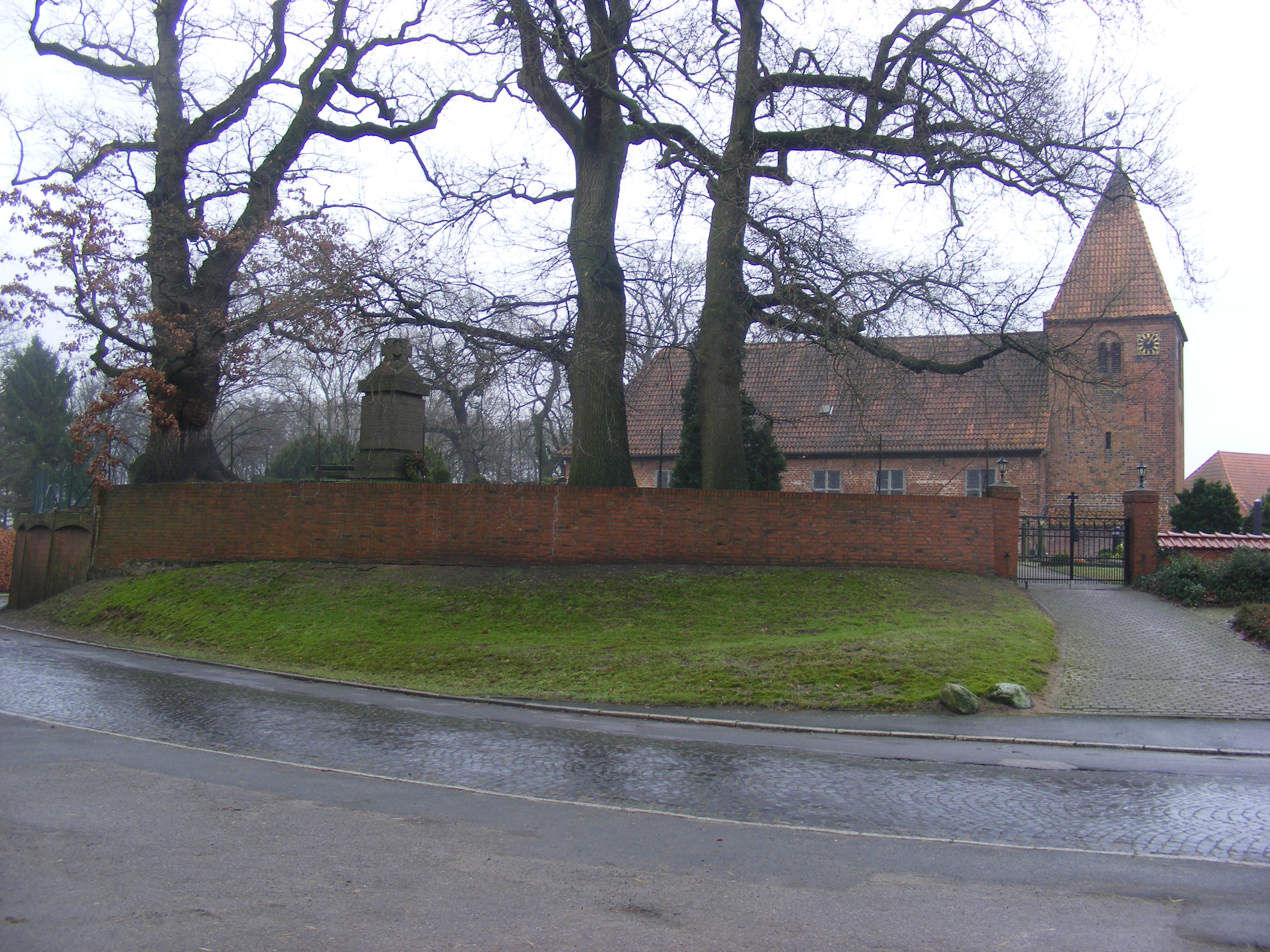
Wasserhorst parish church

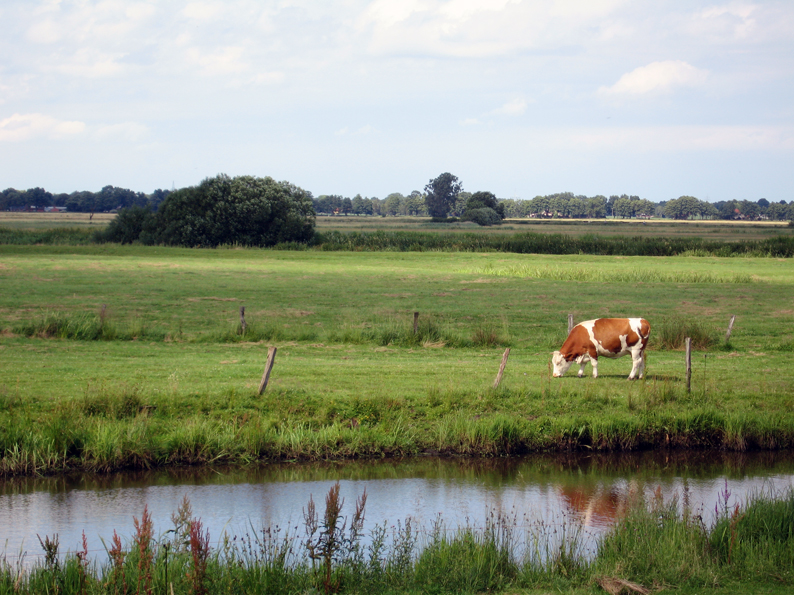
Typical landuse

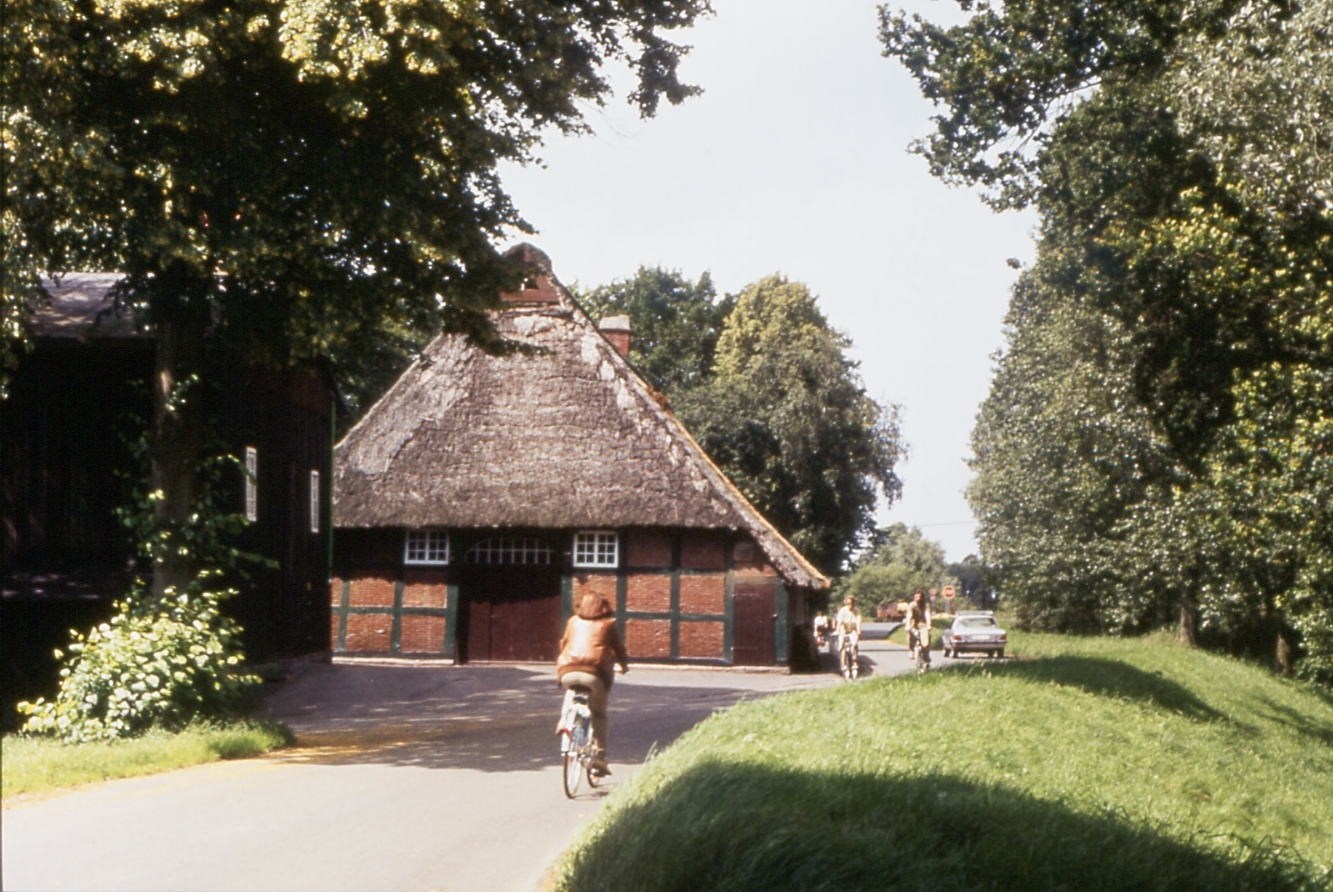
Typical farmhouse on the dike

== Cultural heritage ==
The oldest building of the Blockland is the tower of the evangelical parish church of Wasserhorst (DE). The church was mentioned first in 1185. The tower, in a Romano-Gothic borderline style, was erected in the 13th century. The nave was remodeled in 1743. To keep them safe from inundations, the church and churchyard have been built on an artificial hill (Ger. Warft), here based on a natural hill that had not been high enough to be safe.
