= Beek (Hamme) =

River in Germany

Location
- Country: Germany
- State: Lower Saxony

Physical characteristics
- Mouth: Hamme
  - coordinates: 53°13′20″N 8°52′27″E
- Length: 10.2 km (6.3 mi)

Basin features
- Progression: Hamme→ Lesum→ Weser→ North Sea

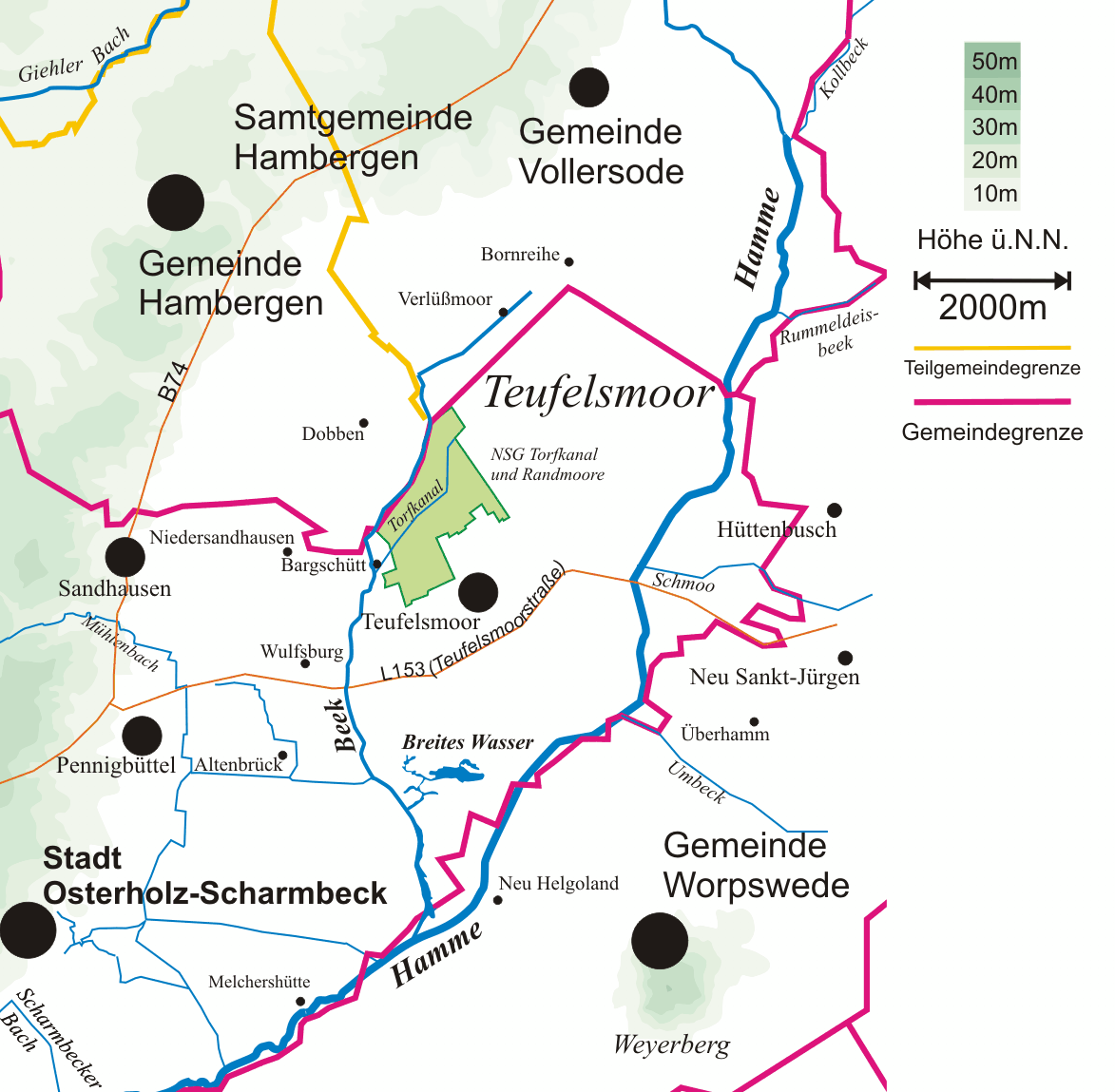
Course of the river Beek in the Teufelsmoor near Osterholz-Scharmbeck

Beek is a river of Lower Saxony, Germany. It flows into the Hamme near Worpswede.

== See also ==
- List of rivers of Lower Saxony
