= Ritterhude =

- Municipality
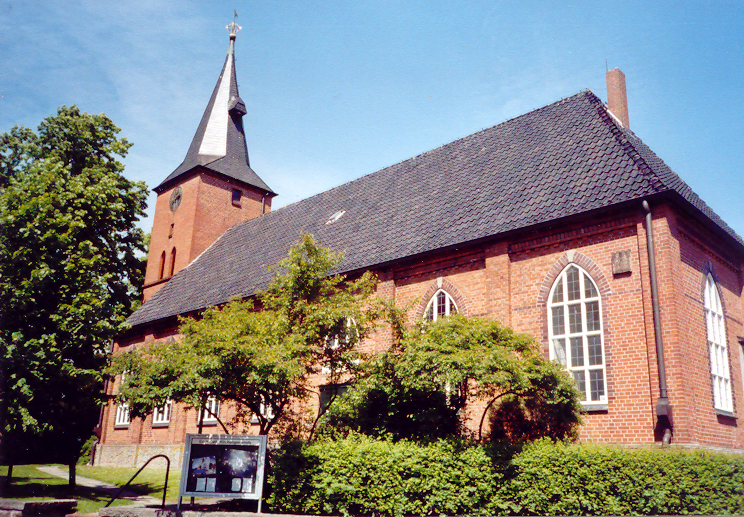
- Church of Saint John in Ritterhude

- Coat of arms

- Location of Ritterhude within Osterholz district
- Interactive map of Ritterhude
- Location within Germany Location within Lower Saxony
- Coordinates: 53°10′59″N 08°45′22″E
- Country: Germany
- State: Lower Saxony
- District: Osterholz
- Subdivisions: 6 districts

Government
  - Mayor (2021–26): Jürgen Kuck (SPD)

Area
  - Total: 32.93 km^{2} (12.71 sq mi)
- Elevation: 10 m (33 ft)

Population (2025-12-31)
  - Total: 14,787
  - Density: 449.0/km^{2} (1,163/sq mi)
- Time zone: UTC+01:00 (CET)
  - Summer (DST): UTC+02:00 (CEST)
- Postal codes: 27721
- Dialling codes: 04292
- Vehicle registration: OHZ
- Website: www.ritterhude.de

Ritterhude (German pronunciation: [ˈʁɪtɐˌhuːdə]; Low German: Hu’e) is a municipality in the district of Osterholz, in Lower Saxony, Germany. It is situated on the river Hamme, approx. 6 km southwest of Osterholz-Scharmbeck, and 13 km northwest of Bremen.

== Geography ==
=== Geographical location ===
The natural landscape is characterized by extended fens, the alluvial wetlands and marshes of the Hamme River and the Wümme River lowlands together with the glacially formed landscape Geest with typically sandy and loamy soils.

=== Organization of the Municipality ===
Ritterhude consists of six villages, which were independent municipalities until 1974. The three large villages, Ritterhude (8.300 inhabitants), Platjenwerbe (2.500), and Ihlpohl (2.200) are direct suburbs of the city of Bremen, while the three small villages Lesumstotel (900 inhabitants), Stendorf (600), and Werschenrege (400) are somewhat further away in the north of the municipality.

=== Transportation ===
- The Ritterhude railway station is connected via S-Bahn to the Deutsche Bahn railway network.
- Ritterhude is conveniently located at A 27 (exit 15, Ihlpohl) and Bundesstraße B 74 (Bremen–Stade).

== History ==
First mention in 1182 in a document of the monastery of Osterholz. The house 'von der Hude' is being mentioned for the first time in a document in 1185. The castle 'Huda' was used in 1309 to protect the passage over the Hamme River at the 'Heerweg' from Hamburg to Bremen. The number of inhabitants increased from 52 families in the year 1568 to 89 in the year 1710. In 1757, both castle and bridge were destroyed during the Seven Years' War.

Ritterhude belonged to the Prince-Archbishopric of Bremen. In 1648, the Prince-Archbishopric was transformed into the Duchy of Bremen, which was first ruled in personal union by the Swedish and, from 1715 onwards, by the Hanoverian Crown. In 1823, the Duchy was abolished and its territory became part of the Stade Region.
