= Grasberg =

- Municipality
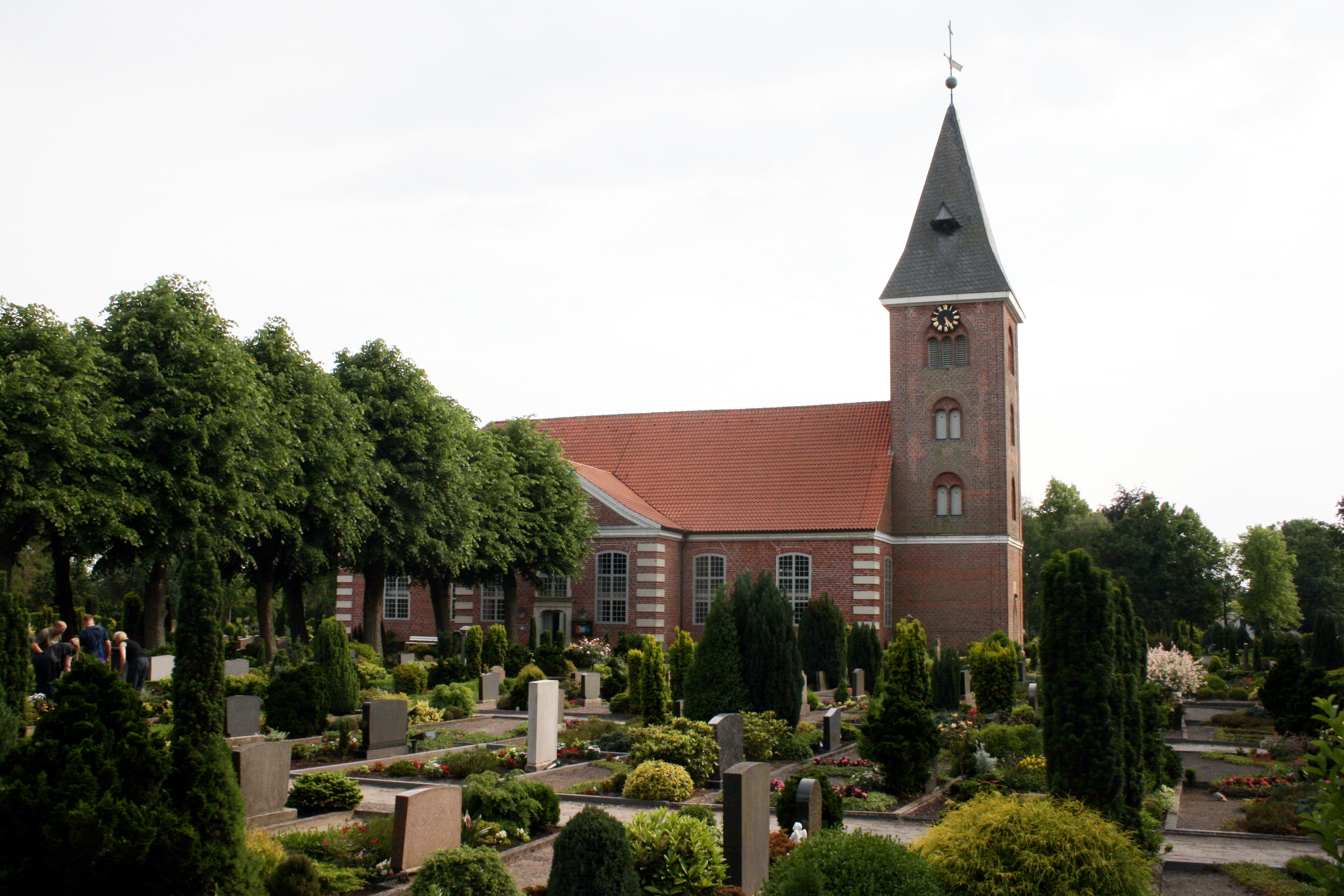
- Lutheran church in Grasberg

- Coat of arms

- Location of Grasberg within Osterholz district
- Interactive map of Grasberg
- Location within Germany Location within Lower Saxony
- Coordinates: 53°11′N 8°59′E
- Country: Germany
- State: Lower Saxony
- District: Osterholz
- Subdivisions: 17 districts

Government
  - Mayor (2021–26): Marion Schorfmann (CDU)

Area
  - Total: 55.77 km^{2} (21.53 sq mi)
- Elevation: 5 m (16 ft)

Population (2025-12-31)
  - Total: 7,672
  - Density: 137.6/km^{2} (356.3/sq mi)
- Time zone: UTC+01:00 (CET)
  - Summer (DST): UTC+02:00 (CEST)
- Postal codes: 28879
- Dialling codes: 04208
- Vehicle registration: OHZ
- Website: www.grasberg.de

Grasberg (German pronunciation: [ˈɡʁaːsbɛʁk]; Low German: Grasbarg) is a municipality in the district of Osterholz, in Lower Saxony, Germany. It is situated approximately 13 km southeast of Osterholz-Scharmbeck, and 20 km northeast of Bremen.

== History ==
Before the cultivation and colonisation of the area comprising today's Grasberg, the landscape was dominated by moorlands. The area belonged to the Prince-Archbishopric of Bremen, established in 1180. By the Peace of Westphalia the Prince-Archbishopric was transformed into the Duchy of Bremen in 1648, which - together with the Principality of Verden - was first given as a prey for its participation in the Thirty Years' War to be ruled in personal union by the Swedish Crown. These two imperial fiefs to the Swedes are thus colloquially called Bremen-Verden.

After a Danish occupation (1712–1715) the Duchy of Bremen was sold to the House of Hanover, and thus became ruled in personal union with the Electorate of Hanover and the United Kingdom. It was Bremen-Verden's government which commissioned the drainage, cultivation and colonisation of the moorlands, first under the responsibility of Moor Commissioner Jürgen Christian Findorff (1720–1792).

In 1785-89 Findorff prompted - after his own design - the construction of the Lutheran church of today's Grasberg on a sandy grass-covered hill (c. 5 m above sea level), giving the name to Grasberg (literally in English: grass mount), serving as a parish church for 12 newly founded villages in the lower moorlands.

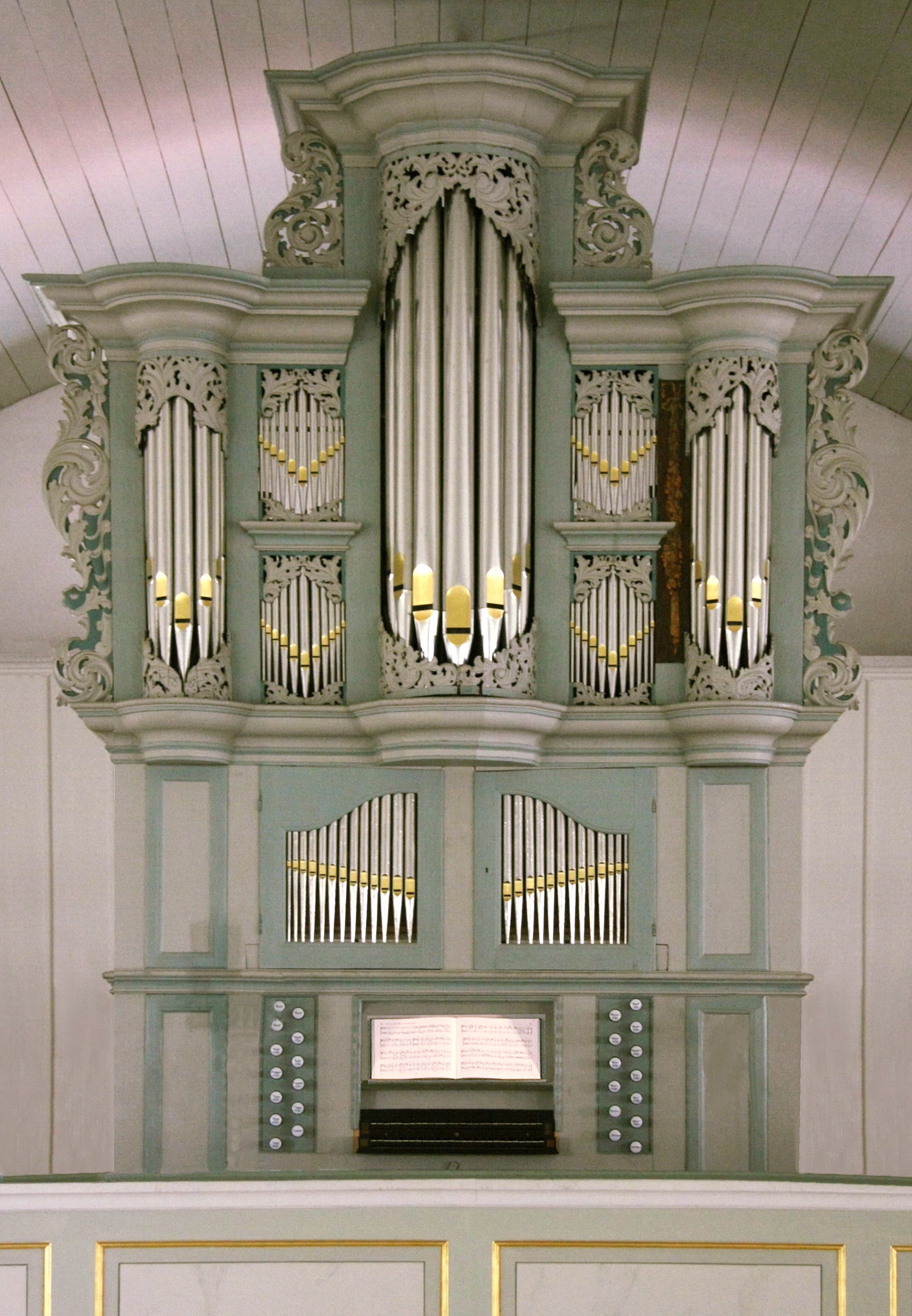
Pipe organ by Arp Schnitger in the Lutheran church.

The Lutheran church houses a rare treasury, the only surviving small scale urban pipe organ created by the famous Arp Schnitger, originally commissioned by an orphanage in Hamburg in 1694. In 1789 Grasberg's congregation bought the organ.

The Hanoveran Duchy of Bremen, including the already existing municipalities now component of Grasberg, changed occupation several times during the Napoléonic Wars.

In 1807 the ephemeric Kingdom of Westphalia annexed the Duchy, before France annexed it in 1810. In 1813 the Duchy was restored to the Electorate of Hanover, which - after its upgrade to the Kingdom of Hanover in 1814 - incorporated the Duchy in a real union and the ducal territory, including the villages now comprising Grasberg, became part of the Stade Region, established in 1823. In 1831 the village named Grasberg developed at the church.

== Component Localities ==
Today's Grasberg comprises a number of formerly independent municipalities, incorporated into Grasberg in the 1970s and 1980s.

- Wörpedorf, established in 1751, incorporated in 1974
- Eickedorf, established in 1753, incorporated in 1974
- Rautendorf, established in 1762, incorporated in 1974
- Schmalenbeck, established in 1762, incorporated in 1974
- Dannenberg, established in 1780, incorporated in 1974
- Tüschendorf, established in 1782, incorporated in 1974
- Meinershausen, established in 1785, incorporated in 1974
- Grasdorf, established in 1784, incorporated in 1974
- Huxfeld, established in 1789, incorporated in 1974
- Seehausen, established in 1790, incorporated in 1974
- Mittelsmoor, established in 1792, incorporated in 1974
- Otterstein, established in 1794, incorporated in 1974
- Adolphsdorf, established in 1800. Lieutenant General Prince Adolphus, Duke of Cambridge, then stationed in the Electorate of Hanover, attended the foundation and named the village after himself Adolphsdorf. Adolphsdorf was incorporated into Grasberg in 1974.
- Weinkaufsmoor, established in 1826, incorporated in 1974
- Grasberg, established in 1831
- Wilstedter Moor, incorporated in 1976
- Tarmstedter Moor, incorporated in 1983
