= Gnarrenburg =

- Municipality
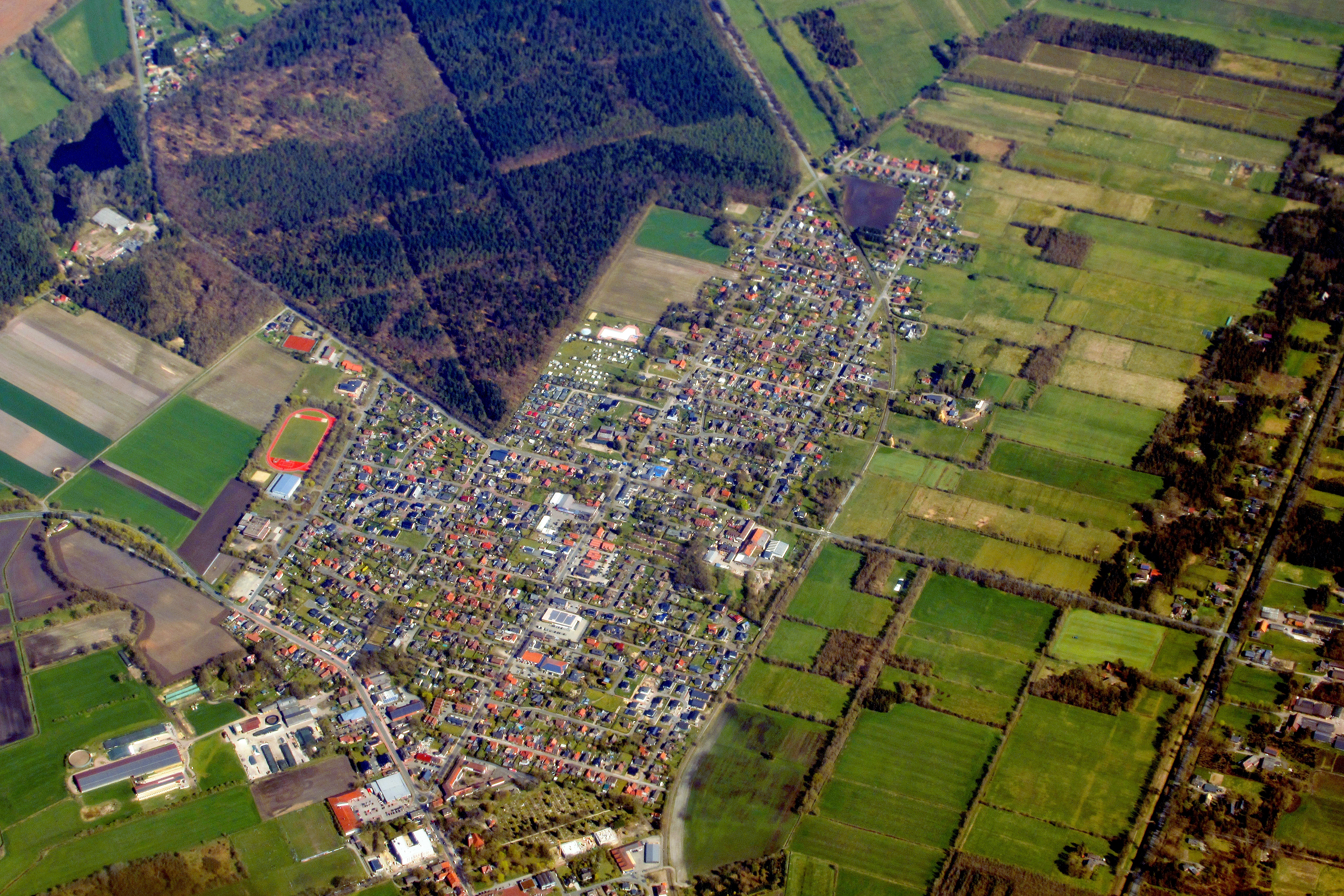
- Aerial view

- Flag Coat of arms

- Location of Gnarrenburg within Rotenburg (Wümme) district
- Interactive map of Gnarrenburg
- Location within Germany Location within Lower Saxony
- Coordinates: 53°23′11″N 09°00′18″E
- Country: Germany
- State: Lower Saxony
- District: Rotenburg (Wümme)
- Subdivisions: 12 districts

Government
  - Mayor (2021–26): Marc Breitenfeld (CDU)

Area
  - Total: 122.91 km^{2} (47.46 sq mi)
- Elevation: 10 m (33 ft)

Population (2025-12-31)
  - Total: 9,203
  - Density: 74.88/km^{2} (193.9/sq mi)
- Time zone: UTC+01:00 (CET)
  - Summer (DST): UTC+02:00 (CEST)
- Postal codes: 27442
- Dialling codes: 04763
- Vehicle registration: ROW
- Website: www.gnarrenburg.de

Gnarrenburg is a municipality in the district of Rotenburg, in Lower Saxony, Germany. It is situated approximately 15 km southwest of Bremervörde, and 40 km northeast of Bremen.

Gnarrenburg belonged to the Prince-Archbishopric of Bremen. In 1648 the Prince-Archbishopric was transformed into the Duchy of Bremen, which was first ruled in personal union by the Swedish and from 1715 on by the Hanoverian Crown. In 1823 the Duchy was abolished and its territory became part of the Stade Region.
