= Hamme (river) =

River in Germany

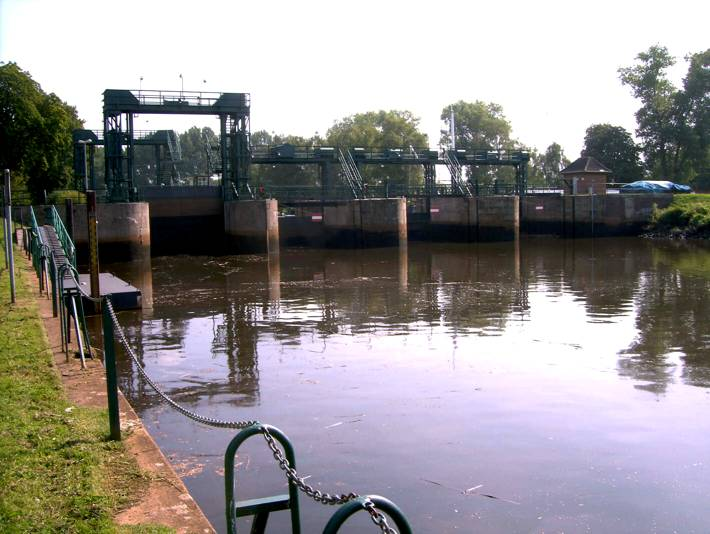

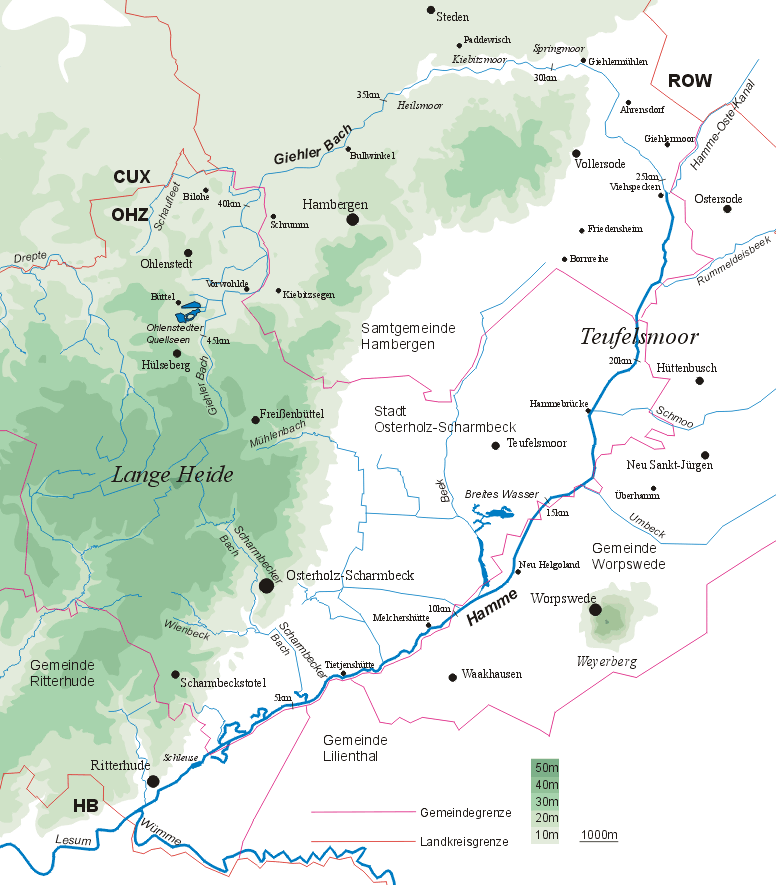
- Course of the Giehler Bach and Hamme from Langer Heide into the Teufelsmoor to its mouth on the Lesum

Location
- Country: Germany
- State: Lower Saxony

Physical characteristics
- Source
  - location: Lange Heide (Giehler Bach)
  - coordinates: 53°15′05″N 8°45′09″E
  - elevation: 45 m above sea level (NN)
- Mouth
  - location: Joins the Wümme near Ritterhude to become the Lesum
  - coordinates: 53°10′22″N 8°44′40″E
  - elevation: 2 m above sea level (NN)
- Length: 48.5 km (30.1 mi)
- Basin size: 549 km^{2} (212 sq mi)

Basin features
- Progression: Lesum→ Weser→ North Sea
- Landmarks: Small towns: Ritterhude
- Tributaries
  - left: Schaufleet, Kollbeck, Rummeldeisbeek, Schmoo, Neu Sankt Jürgener Schiffgraben, Umbeck, Wörpedahler Graben, Semkenfahrt, Kirchenfleet, Neugrabenfleet, Deichkampfleet
  - right: Butterweidengraben, Beek, Fankstaken, Osterholzer Hafenkanal, Scharmbecker Bach,
- Navigable: From the transition of the Oste-Hamme Canal into the Kollbeck (this is also where the kilometre marking begins) to the confluence with the Lesum. The main limiting factors are the locks and the nature conservation regulations.

The Hamme (in its upper reaches Giehler Bach) is a 48 km (30 mi) long river in Germany, Lower Saxony, north-east of Bremen. Its source is north of Osterholz-Scharmbeck. It flows through the moors north-east of Bremen called Teufelsmoor, and meets the river Wümme in Ritterhude. From this junction, the river is called Lesum. The Lesum flows into the river Weser in Bremen-Vegesack.

On the river Hamme there are many water-sport clubs, for example the Wassersportclub Hamme e.V. (watersports-club Hamme), the Ruder-Verein Osterholz-Scharmbeck von 1901 e.V. (Rowing Club Osterholz-Scharmbeck since 1901) and the Segel Club Hamme e.V. (Sailing Club Hamme).

== Course ==
The upper reaches of the Hamme are called the Giehler Bach (Giehl Stream). The Giehler Bach originates in the heathland of the Lange Heide northeast of Osterholz-Scharmbeck, a geest plateau at a height of about 45 m above sea level (NN), which is also the source of many other geest streams (such as the Drepte, Scharmbecker Bach, Schönebecker Aue and Wienbeck). The sport designated as the "source" is the outlet of several drainage ditches on the plateau which is used for farming.

From this geest ridge, a terminal moraine from the Saale glaciation, the Giehler Bach flows northeastwards and descends within a few kilometers between the villages of Hülseberg and Freißenbüttel to a height about 15 m above sea level (NN). Near Ohlenstedt it is joined by waters from the Ohlenstedter Quellseen lakes and the river, falling very gently, then flows through the collective municipality of Hambergen to the Springmoor near Giehlermühlen (Vollersode) (5 m above sea level).

From there, the stream descends very gently to the Teufelsmoor, where it is finally discharges into the Hamme into the Giehler Moor near Viehspecken (4 m above sea level). It is also joined by the Oste-Hamme Canal (Kollbeck). Flowing very slowly, the Hamme now heads south through the glacial valley named after her.

Between the former moor colonies of Bornreihe and Hüttenbusch the river now continues in the direction of Worpswede, where it is joined by three left-hand tributaries, the Rummeldeisbeek, Schmoo and Umbeck. A few kilometers upstream the Beek enters from the right, draining most of the moors west of Hamme. Near the mouth of the Beek on the Hamme is the picturesque nature reserve of Breites Wasser, which is the largest remaining lake in the lowland region. From here the Hamme flows in a southwesterly direction past Osterholz-Scharmbeck towards Ritterhude.

In the 19th century, this part of the Hamme was straightened and the numerous meanders were cut at a total of seven places, so that the length of the river was reduced from 9 to 4.3 km. Behind the locks in Ritterhude, built in 1876, which keep the Hamme tide-free, the Hamme joins the tidal river of the Wümme near the city limits of Bremen and together they form the salt-waters of the Lesum, which enters the Weser 10 km downstream. The old branches of the river were mainly preserved as one-sided confluences with the Hamme. A remaining part of the so-called Altarm 3 ("Old Arm no. 3") southeast of Scharmbeckstotel was de-sludged in 2007 as part of the Hamme Depression Nature Conservation Project and in 2008 a sill was added to prevent it from running empty at low water. At the end of January 2020, after three months of construction, the 230-metre-long stretch of this waterbody that had been filled in was dug up again over its length and connected to the Hamme.

The total length of the river is 48 km and it descends through about 45 m.

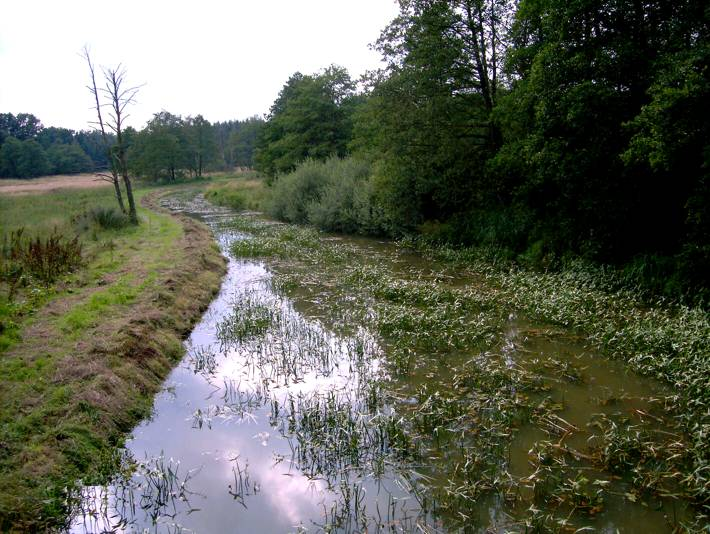
Upper reaches of the Hamme (Giehler Bach) in the Springmoor

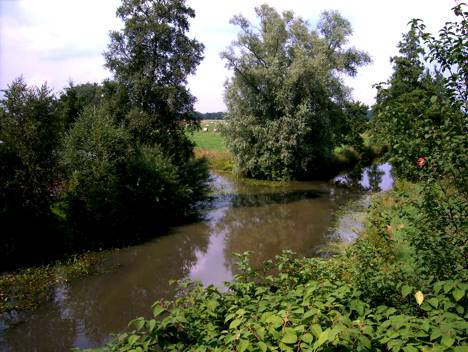
Mouth of the Giehler Bach and the Oste-Hamme Canal near Viehspecken

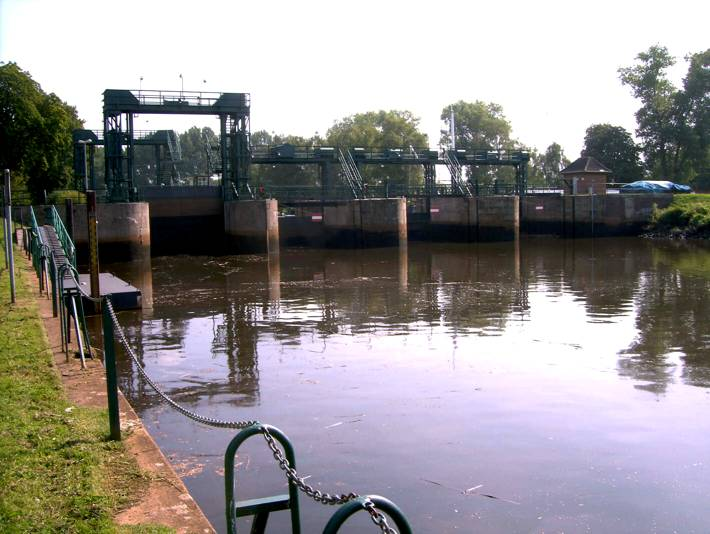
Hamme locks in Ritterhude

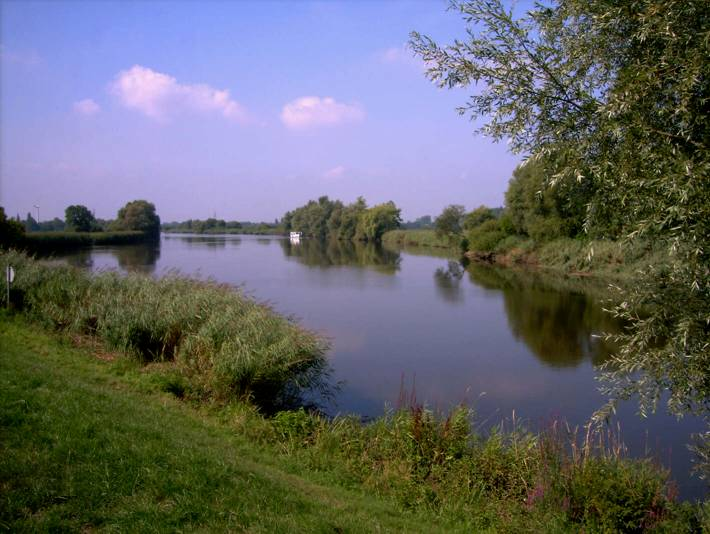
Confluence of the Hamme and the Wümme (from left) to become the Lesum

== See also ==
- List of rivers of Lower Saxony
