= Lesum =

River in Germany

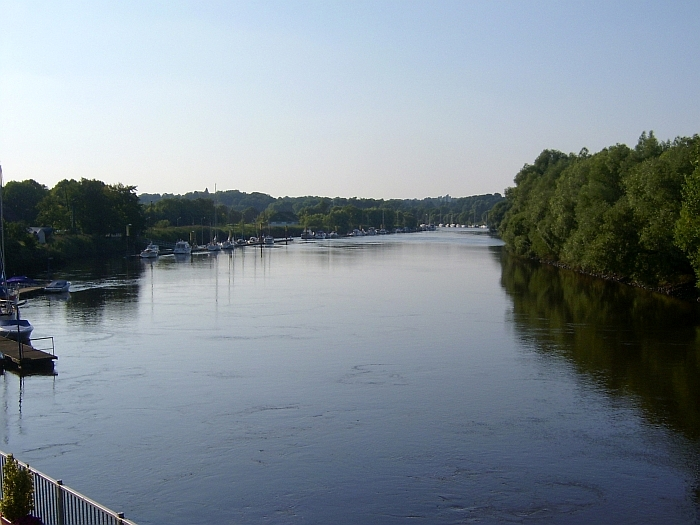
- Mouth of the Lesum near Vegesack

Location
- Country: Germany
- State: Bremen
- City: Bremen

Physical characteristics
- Source
  - location: Confluence of the Wümme and Hamme rivers near Ritterhude
  - coordinates: 53°10′17″N 8°44′33″E
  - elevation: 4 m (13 ft)
- Mouth: Weser
  - location: Bremen-Vegesack
  - coordinates: 53°10′0″N 8°37′28″E
  - elevation: 4 m (13 ft)
- Length: 9.85 km (6.12 mi)
- Basin size: 2,187 km^{2} (844 sq mi)

Basin features
- Progression: Weser→ North Sea
- Tributaries
  - left: Wümme
  - right: Hamme

The Lesum (German pronunciation: [ˈleːzʊm]) is a 9.85-kilometre-long (6 mi) river in northern Germany, right tributary of the Weser, navigable for Class III ships. It is formed at the confluence of the rivers Wümme and Hamme, near Ritterhude, northwest of Bremen. It flows west and flows into the Weser in Bremen-Vegesack.

Lesum, also named Burglesum is also a borough of Bremen, situated at the confluence of the Lesum and Weser rivers. Known for its green spaces and historic architecture, it forms part of the larger Bremen-Nord district.

== See also ==
- List of rivers of Bremen
- List of rivers of Lower Saxony
