= Wümme =

River in Germany

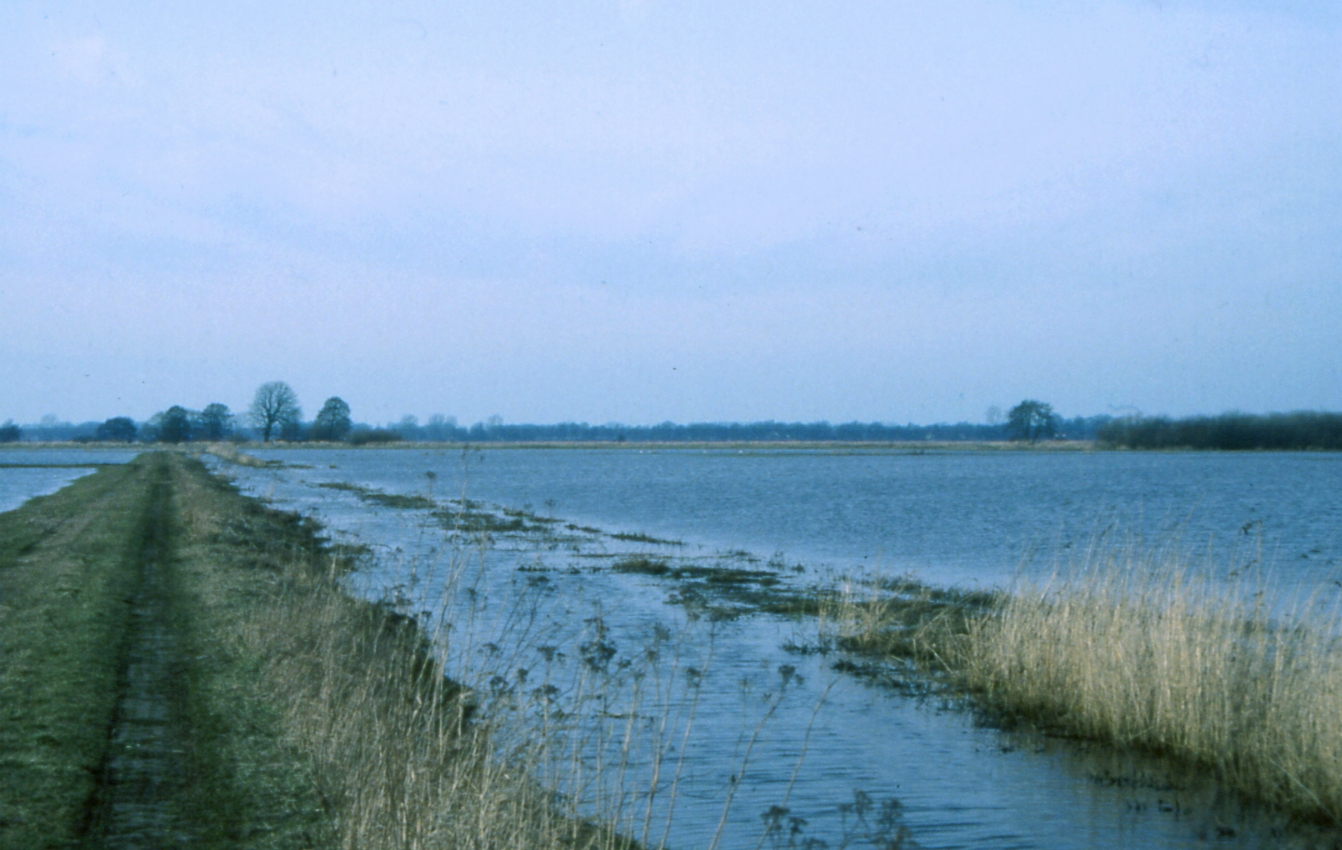
- Low riverside pastures of the Wümme near Bremen. During winter these are often flooded.

Location
- Country: Germany
- States: Lower Saxony and Bremen

Physical characteristics
- Source
  - location: Lüneburg Heath
  - coordinates: 53.1277°N 9.8957°E
- Mouth
  - location: Lesum
  - coordinates: 53.1720°N 8.7430°E
- Length: 121 km (75 mi)

Basin features
- Progression: Lesum→ Weser→ North Sea

Wümme (German pronunciation: [ˈvʏmə]) is a river in northern Germany, in the states Lower Saxony and Bremen, marking the border between the two states for part of its course. It is the main headstream of the Lesum.

The Wümme's length is 121 kilometres (75 mi). Including the 9.9 km (6.2 mi) Lesum, that runs into the river Weser, its total length is 131.2 km (81.5 mi).

The river's source is on the Wulfsberg in Lüneburg Heath. West of Rotenburg, it takes up the rivers Rodau and Wiedau. The Wümme from the left and the Hamme from the right combine near Wasserhorst (part of Blockland in Bremen) forming the Lesum.

Towns on the river Wümme are Lauenbrück, Scheeßel, Rotenburg, Ottersberg, Fischerhude, Lilienthal and Bremen.

== See also ==
- List of rivers of Bremen
- List of rivers of Lower Saxony
