= Land Wursten =

- Samtgemeinde
- Flag Coat of arms

- Location of Land Wursten within Cuxhaven district
- Interactive map of Land Wursten
- Location within Germany Location within Lower Saxony
- Coordinates: 53°42′N 8°33′E
- Country: Germany
- State: Lower Saxony
- District: Cuxhaven
- Founded: 1974-03-01
- Disbanded: January 2015
- Subdivisions: 7

Area
  - Total: 116.97 km^{2} (45.16 sq mi)

Population (2013-12-31)
  - Total: 9,551
  - Density: 81.65/km^{2} (211.5/sq mi)
- Time zone: UTC+01:00 (CET)
  - Summer (DST): UTC+02:00 (CEST)
- Website: www.sglandwursten.de

Land Wursten is a former Samtgemeinde ("collective municipality") in the district of Cuxhaven, in Lower Saxony, Germany. It was situated approximately 20 km (12 mi) southwest of Cuxhaven, and 15 km (9.3 mi) north of Bremerhaven. Its seat was in the village Dorum. It was disbanded in January 2015, when its member municipalities merged into the new municipality Wurster Nordseeküste.

== Components of the Samtgemeinde ==
The Samtgemeinde Land Wursten consisted of the following municipalities:

1. Cappel
2. Dorum^{1}
3. Midlum
4. Misselwarden
5. Mulsum
6. Padingbüttel
7. Wremen

== History ==
The Land of Wursten was a rather autonomous Frisian farmers' republic in Northern Germany under only loose overlordship of the Prince-Archbishopric of Bremen. Bremian knightly families aimed at subjecting the Wursten Frisians. The Lords of Diepholz owned the Hollburg Castle between Holßel and Midlum on the brink of the Wesermünde Geest ridge, allowing a good view over the lower Land of Wursten. In 1219 six Diepholz Lords, related as cousins, owning estates in and near Midlum, founded the Midlum Nunnery and endowed them to it. Rather than establishing the nunnery as their proprietary monastery the Diepholz family made it over to the cathedral chapter of the Bremen archdiocese. However, the Diepholz family adopted the advocacy (Vogtei) over the nunnery, later passed on to the Knights of Bederkesa who were related by marriage.

The convent's actual original affiliation to a monastic order is not documented. No hint is recorded that the convent strove to be incorporated into the Cistercian Order. It is also possible that the convent followed Cistercian customs without formal incorporation. However, the convent started the typical Cistercian practice to build up a large autark integrated production (Eigenwirtschaft). Unlike unsettled and undeveloped areas where Cistercians usually founded new monasteries the farmlands donated to the convent were held by feudal tenants and sparsed in and around Midlum. The convent cleared its feudal farmlands from the unfree peasants tilling them (cf. Lowland Clearances) transforming them into dependent agrarian workers or cotters (smallholders who need additional work) and (most of) their fields into the convent's demesne.

On outlying estates the convent founded its Vorwerk of Kransburg which today forms a locality of Midlum. All over the parish of Midlum, e.g. in Sorthum, Northum, Wenckebüttel and Esigstedt, the convent acquired the overlordship to farmlands from those lords who held it before, in order to round off its demesne. The convent cleared the latter two villages from peasants which were thus abandoned.

Along the low side of the Wesermünde Geest ridge towards the marshy Land of Wursten there is a narrow swampy strip of wasteland called the Wursten Sietland. While the Wursten Frisians claimed the Sietland as their commons, the convent started to include it into its demesnes. In the valley cuts of the geest between Holßel and Nordholz the convent impounded little becks in order to lay out stewponds for the fish as fasting dishes at lent.

The convent's demesne expansion meant the exclusive usage of geest forests, mires and heaths, previously also commonly used by the free Frisian peasants from the mostly treeless Land of Wursten in order to gain turf, firewood, timber and the fertilising plaggen. Thus the demesne expansion posed a massive threat for the material survival of the Wursten Frisians as free peasants. Without fuel, timber or fertiliser they could not help it but would sooner or later have to commendate themselves to feudal lords from the geest. The free Wursten Frisians disliked the noble establishment of a convent in their vicinity and treated the nuns with resentment.

In the same time knightly families from the geest aimed at subjecting the Wursten Frisians to their feudal overlordship in order to gain more from unpaid feudal labour and by compelling feudal dues and duties. The convent's desmesne but also manorial expansion just added up to these tensions. In the Wursten War (1256–1258) the Wursten Frisians repelled a knightly invasion to subject them to manorial (seigniorial) jurisdiction. The array of knights, among them members of the Diepholz and the Rahden families, then still landed in Rhade, was led by the Knight of Bederkesa. The defeated knights hat to withdraw deep into the Bederkesa Bailiwick and exposed the boundary adjacent to the Land of Wursten, among others the Midlum parish.

After the victory the Land of Wursten occupied the Midlum parish. The unsettled geest strips within Midlum's municipal boundary are called Wursten Heath (Wurster Heide) since. However, the convent and the nuns were treated with great care not to deliver Prince-Archbishop Gebhard of Lippe any pretext. The Wursten Frisians remembered the ordeal of the free Stedingen peasants in 1234, who refused to accept feudal overlordship too, but whom Gebhard had excommunicated and against whom he induced and fought a papally confirmed crusade, all after few Stedingers had slain an itinerant monk.

Under the rule of the sixteen elected consuls of the Land of Wursten the demesne expansion of the convent was successfully hindered. Soon the Midlum parish and its peasant population became integral parts of the Land of Wursten. The convent declined and blamed this to its location among the "perverse and bad people [the Wursten Frisians], striving for criminal and unallowed aims", as recorded in a convent deed. For them and Bremen's Prince-Archbishop Gilbert of Brunckhorst (ruling from 1273 to 1306) hindering the convent's demesne and manorial expansion could be nothing else but an unallowed aim. This finally led to the relocation of the convent out of Wursten Frisian control.

So 1282 the convent was moved to Wolde, present Altenwalde, since 1972 a part of Cuxhaven. Prince-Archbishop Gilbert considered the convent his outpost to wield influence in the free peasant areas of the Lands of Hadeln and of Wursten as well as among separatist noble vassals such as the Lappes. Gilbert provided for the convent richly after its transfer to Wolde. On 17 April 1289 Gilbert assigned the tithe of Northum to the convent.

Even after the move the convent asserted most of its feudal possessions and privileges in the Midlum parish, then a part of Wursten. In 1331 the commoner Gerhard de Merne (= Marren, Süder- and Nordermarren near Midlum) usurped the tithe from Esigstedt, protested by the convent, the enfranchised beneficiary, and left it again to the nuns only after the pastors of the Wursten parishes had intervened. The still hostile Wursten Frisians looted pilgrims on their way to the convent in Wolde, causing the nuns' decision to move from Wolde on to Neuenwalde. The relations of the Land of Wursten with the convent improved and on 24 June 1383 the Wursten Consuls donated several estates left by people without heirs to the convent in order to pray requiem masses for the deceased. In 1399 the consuls of the Land of Wursten concluded with the convent that they guaranteed safe-conduct through the Midlum parish for the pilgrims on their way to Wolde (present Altenwalde).

In 1484 the Wursten Frisians repelled John V, Duke of Saxe-Lauenburg, also ruling in close-by Hadeln, and his troops in the Battle of Alsum, trying to subject them to his feudal overlordship. John's son, Hadeln's Regent Magnus, the heir apparent of Saxe-Lauenburg tried to grind out his father's notch and hired the Great or Black Guard in order to subject the Land of Wursten. On 26 December 1499 the Wursten Frisians defeated the Black Guard in the Battle of Weddewarden. In 1517 Prince-Archbishop Christopher the Spendthrift opened a campaign to subject the Wursten Frisians. The prince-archiepiscopal government demanded to levy taxes from newly dyked lands and the Wursten Frisians, claiming them as self-acquired, refused to pay. Thus Christopher the Spendthrift sent mercenaries into the Land of Wursten and on 23 December Wursten succumbed in the Battle at the Wremer Tief during which Tjede Peckes was slain. Christopher the Spendthrift declared Wursten's autonomous constitution nul and void and obtained his imperial enfeoffment with Wursten at the Diet of Augsburg of 1517.

On 4 August 1518 the Consuls of the Land of Wursten, and envoys of the prince-archbishop met on the Wursten thingstead in order to fix the amount and to discuss the levying of the taxes. The parties flew into a fury and in the end the Wursten Frisians slew Dean Cordt Klencke, archdeacon of Hadeln and Wursten, Engelbert von der Malsburg, prince-archiepiscopal landdrost, and 16 more prince-archiepiscopal envoys.

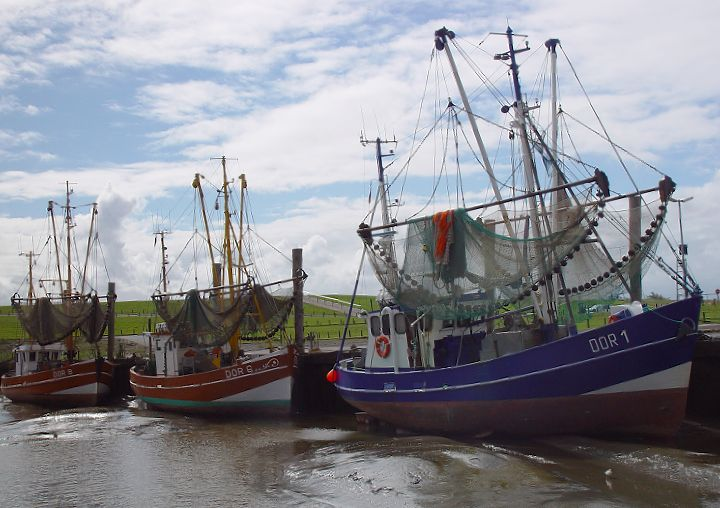
Shrimp cutter in Dorum-Neufeld

For the upcoming prince-archiepiscopal response the Wursten Frisians allied with their former enemy Duke Magnus I of Saxe-Lauenburg, who confirmed their autonomy in return for rendering him homage. On 8 September 1518 ducal forces arriving by ship and Wursten fighters attacking from the land side razed the brandnew prince-archiepiscopal Morgenstern Castle in Weddewarden. The Wursten Frisians saw their chance and covered the borderland adjacent to Wursten, including the Neuenwalde convent seigniorial bailiwick, with raids and attacks. In 1518 Prioress Wommella Wachmans appealed to the Wursten Consuls not to incite or even undertake the ravaging of houses and looting of grain and firewood from the convent's feudal tenants.

The troops of Christopher the Spendthrift finally subjected the Wursten Frisians in the Battle of Mulsum on 9 August 1524. In 1525 the Wursten Consuls had to conclude the Treaty of Stade, which incorporated Wursten into the prince-archbishopric, did away with the Wursten constitution, including the election of consuls and subjected the Wursten Frisians to feudal dues and duties and prince-archiepiscopal bailiffs (Vögte), wielding authoritarian force over the Wursten Frisians.

In 1648 the elective monarchy of the Prince-Archbishopric was transformed into the heritable monarchy of the Duchy of Bremen, which was first ruled in personal union by the Swedish Crown and from 1715 on by the House of Hanover. In 1823 the Duchy was abolished and its territory became part of the Stade Region within the Kingdom of Hanover.
