= Midlum, Lower Saxony =

Midlum
- Ortsteil of Wurster Nordseeküste
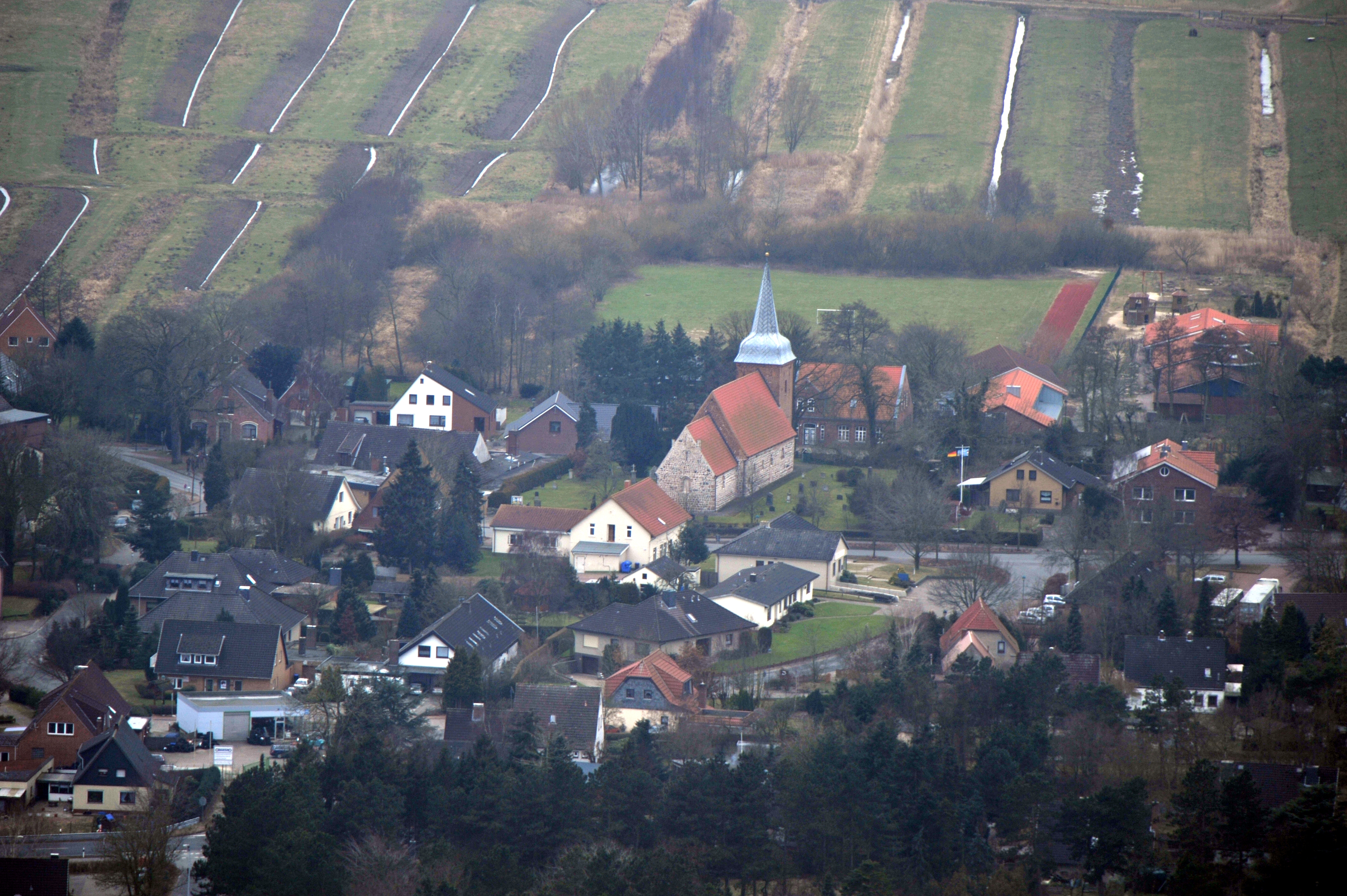
- Aerial photo with St. Pancras Church

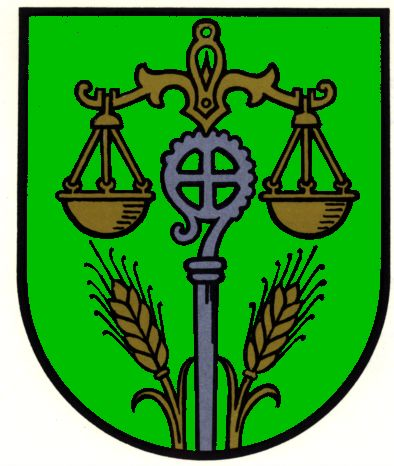
- Coat of arms
- Interactive map of Midlum
- Location within Germany Location within Lower Saxony
- Coordinates: 53°43′45″N 08°36′56″E
- Country: Germany
- State: Lower Saxony
- District: Cuxhaven
- Municipality: Wurster Nordseeküste

Area
  - Total: 31.07 km^{2} (12.00 sq mi)
- Elevation: 21 m (69 ft)

Population (2013-12-31)
  - Total: 1,681
  - Density: 54.10/km^{2} (140.1/sq mi)
- Time zone: UTC+01:00 (CET)
  - Summer (DST): UTC+02:00 (CEST)
- Postal codes: 27639
- Dialling codes: 04741
- Vehicle registration: CUX
- Website: www.midlum.de

Midlum (German pronunciation: [ˈmɪdlʊm]; Low German: Millm) is a village and a former municipality in the district of Cuxhaven, in Lower Saxony, Germany. Since 1 January 2015 it is part of the municipality Wurster Nordseeküste.

== History ==
Originally Midlum was considered part of the Land of Hadeln. In 1219 six members of the family of the Lords of Diepholz, owning estates in and near Midlum, founded the Midlum Nunnery and endowed them to it. The Diepholz Lords then owned the Hollburg Castle between Holßel and Midlum on the brink of the Wesermünde Geest ridge, allowing a good view over the lower Land of Wursten, then a corporation of free Frisian peasants under only loose overlordship of the Prince-Archbishopric of Bremen.

Rather than establishing the nunnery as their proprietary monastery the Diepholz family made it over to the cathedral chapter of the Prince-Archbishopric of Bremen. However, the Diepholz family adopted the advocacy (Vogtei) over the nunnery, later passed on to the Knights of Bederkesa who were related by marriage.

In 1227 Prince-Archbishop Gebhard of Lippe confirmed and thus recognised the foundation of the convent. Midlum's St. Pancras Church, which existed before, was integrated into the convent. No remains of cloister or conventual outbuildings remain, and there are only few documentary references to them.

It is possible that the convent followed Cistercian customs without formal incorporation. The convent started the typical Cistercian practice to build up a large autark integrated production (Eigenwirtschaft). Unlike unsettled and undeveloped areas where Cistercians usually founded new monasteries the farmlands donated to the convent were held by feudal tenants and sparsed in and around Midlum.

The convent cleared its feudal farmlands from the unfree peasants tilling them (cf. Lowland Clearances) transforming them into dependent agrarian workers or cotters (smallholders who need additional work) and (most of) their fields into the convent's demesne. This transformation posed an immediate hardship for the feudal tenants on the geest in and around Midlum.

On outlying estates the convent founded its Vorwerk of Kransburg which today forms a locality of Midlum. All over the parish of Midlum, e.g. in Sorthum, Northum, Wenckebüttel and Esigstedt, the convent acquired the overlordship to farmlands from those lords who held it before, in order to round off its demesne. The convent cleared the latter two villages from peasants which were thus abandoned.

Along the low side of the Wesermünde Geest ridge towards the marshy Land of Wursten there is a narrow swampy strip of wasteland called the Wursten Sietland. While the Wursten Frisians claimed the Sietland as their commons, the convent started to include it into its demesnes. In the valley cuts of the geest between Holßel and Nordholz the convent impounded little becks in order to lay out stewponds for the fish as fasting dishes at lent.

The convent's demesne expansion meant the exclusive usage of geest forests, mires and heaths, previously also commonly used by the free Frisian peasants from the mostly treeless Land of Wursten in order to gain turf, firewood, timber and the fertilising plaggen. Thus the demesne expansion posed a massive threat for the material survival of the Wursten Frisians as free peasants. Without fuel, timber or fertiliser they could not help it but would sooner or later have to commendate themselves to feudal lords from the geest.

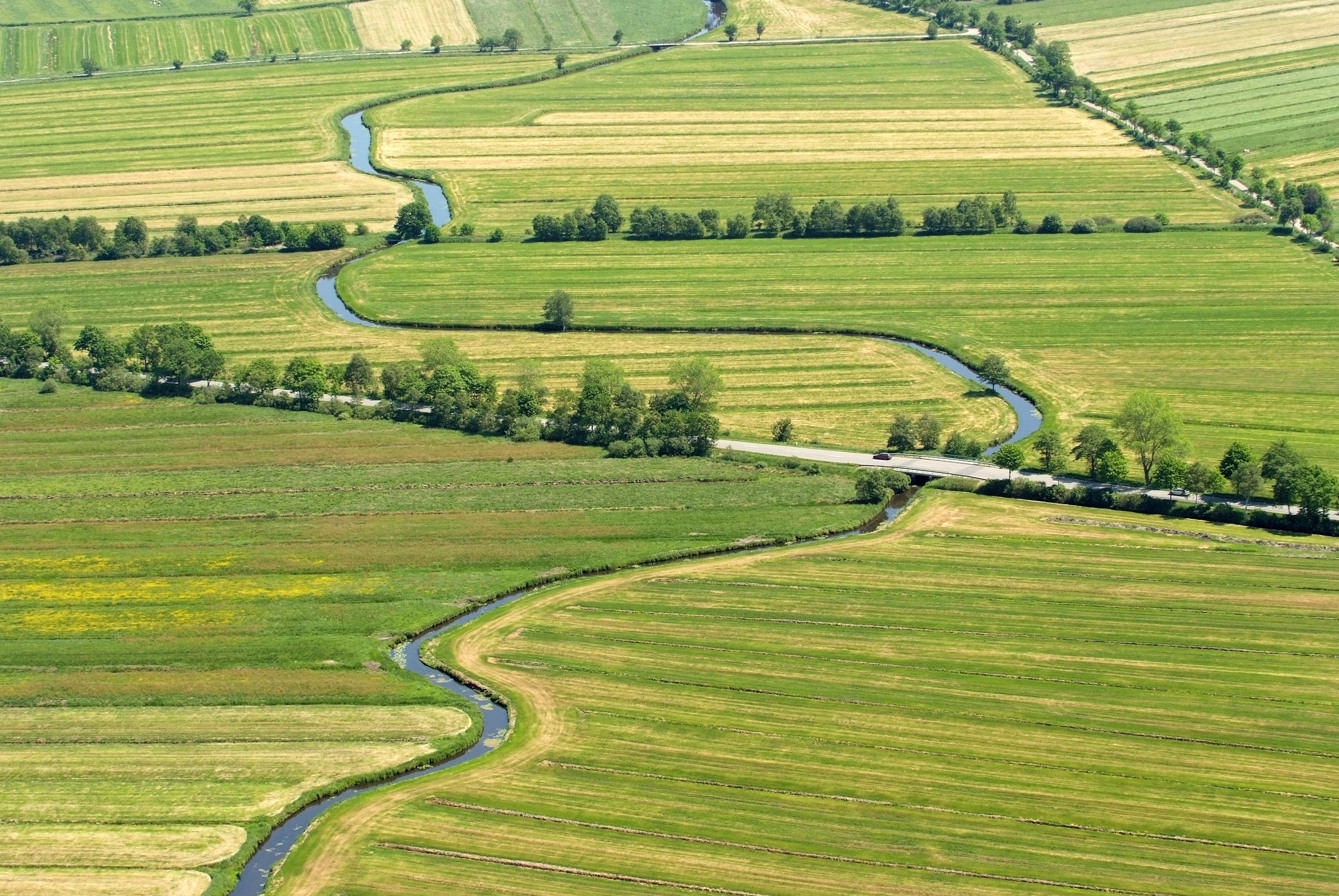
The Emmelke river at Midlum

In the same time knightly families from the geest aimed at subjecting the Wursten Frisians to their feudal overlordship in order to gain more from unpaid feudal labour and by compelling feudal dues and duties. In the Wursten War (1256–1258) the Wursten Frisians repelled a knightly invasion to subject them to manorial (seigniorial) jurisdiction. The defeated knights hat to withdraw deep into the Bederkesa Bailiwick and exposed the boundary adjacent to the Land of Wursten, among others the Midlum parish.

After the victory the Land of Wursten occupied the Midlum parish. The unsettled geest strips within Midlum's municipal boundary then adopted the new name Wursten Heath (Wurster Heide) since. However, the convent and the nuns were treated with great care not to deliver Prince-Archbishop Gebhard any pretext. The Wursten Frisians remembered the ordeal of the free Stedingen peasants in 1234, who refused to accept feudal overlordship too, but whom Gebhard had excommunicated and against whom he induced and fought a papally confirmed crusade, all after few Stedingers had slain an itinerant monk.

Under the rule of the consuls of the Land of Wursten the demesne expansion of the convent was successfully hindered. Soon the Midlum parish and its peasant population became integral parts of the Land of Wursten. The convent declined and blamed this to its location among the "perverse and bad people [the Wursten Frisians], striving for criminal and unallowed aims", as recorded in a convent deed. For them and Bremen's Prince-Archbishop Gilbert of Brunckhorst (ruling from 1273 to 1306) hindering the convent's demesne and manorial expansion could be nothing else but an unallowed aim. This finally led to the relocation of the convent out of Wursten Frisian control to Wolde, present Altenwalde.

Even after the move the convent asserted most of its feudal possessions and privileges in the Midlum parish. In 1331 the commoner Gerhard de Merne (= Marren, Süder- and Nordermarren near Midlum) usurped the tithe from Esigstedt, protested by the convent, the enfranchised beneficiary, and only left again to the nuns after the pastors of the Wursten parishes had intervened. In 1399 the convent concluded with the consuls of the Land of Wursten that they guaranteed safe-conduct through the Midlum parish for the pilgrims on their way to the Altenwalde Holy Cross Chapel.

With the final subjection of the Land of Wursten in 1524, long been claimed by the Prince-Archbishopric of Bremen, it became part of that imperial estate. In 1648 the Prince-Archbishopric was transformed into the Duchy of Bremen, which was first ruled in personal union by the Swedish Crown - interrupted by a Danish occupation (1712–1715) - and from 1715 on by the Hanoverian Crown. In 1807 occupied by the Napoleon, his ephemeric client-state the Kingdom of Westphalia annexed the Duchy in 1810, before France annexed it year after. In 1813 the Duchy was restored to the Electorate of Hanover, which - after its upgrade to the Kingdom of Hanover in 1814 - incorporated the Duchy in a real union and the Ducal territory, including Flögeln, became part of the new Stade Region, established in 1823.
