= List of battles involving Frisia =

This is a list of battles and wars of Frisia or Friesland.

The historical context is as follows:

- 600-734 Frisian Dukes
- 734-1156 Frankish rule
- 1156-1498 time of Frisian freedom
- 1498-1744 rule by dukes and Stadtholders.

== List ==
=== Early battles ===
- 28 - Battle of Baduhenna Wood, against the Romans
- ca 450 - Battle of Finnburg, legendary battle of king Finn against the Danes
- ca 525 - Battle on the Rhine, against the Danes

=== The Age of the Kings ===
- Frisian–Frankish wars
- 689 - Battle of Dorestad
- 716 - Battle of Cologne
- 716 - Battle of Amblève
- 734 - Battle of the Boarn

=== The Age of the Franks ===
- 873 - Battle of Dokkum / Battle of Oostergo against the Vikings.
- 884 - Battle of Norditi, against the Vikings.
- 993 - Battle of Winkel, rebellion against Arnulf, Count of Holland
- 1018 - Battle of Vlaardingen, Dirk III, Count of Holland against the Holy Roman Emperor

=== Frisian freedom ===
- 1076 - Battle of Iselmonde
- 1151 - Battle of Mildeburch, Nordfrisian against the Danes
- 1252 - Battle of Oldenswort, against the king of Danmark
- 1254 - Battle of Sieverner Specken, against the knights of Bederkesa and Holsel
- 1256 - Battle of Heechwâld, against the count of Holland
- 1282 - Battle of Schellinkhout, against the count of Holland
- 1297 - Battle of Froanen, against the count of Holland
- 1340 - Conquest of the Sibetsburg by the Wursten Frisians
- 1344 - Battle of Langsundtoft, against the Danes
- 1345 - Battle of Warns, against the count of Holland
- 1380 - Battle of Arum, muontsen fan it kleaster Ludingatsjerke tsjin dy fan it Aldekleaster
- 1380 - Battle of Loppersum, House Abdena vs. House Tom Brok
- 1392 - Conquest of Ritzebüttel-Cuxhaven castle by the Wursten Frisians
- 1396 - Battle of Schoterzijl, against the count of Holland

==== Crusades ====
- 1218 - Fifth Crusade, Frisian crusaders against Damietta
- 1270 - Eighth Crusade, Frisian crusaders against the Moors

==== Vetkopers and Schieringers ====
- 1397 - Battle op de Menamer-mieden
- 1429 - Battle of Sondel
- 1457 - Battle of Westerstede, against Oldenburg
- 1463 - Battle of Mounesyl, battle during the Donia war
- 1492 - Battle of Barrahuis

==== The Great Frisian War ====
- 1417 - Battle of Okswerderzijl, Sikke Sjaarda against Keno II tom Brok
- 1418 - Battle of Dokkum, Skieringers against Fokko Ukena
- 1419 - Battle of Miedum, Vetkoppers against Sikke Sjaarda
- 1420 - Battle near the Paelesleat, Sikke Sjaarda against Fokko Ukena
- 1420 - Battle of Sloten, Schieringers against Fokko Ukena

==== East Frisia liberty wars ====
- 1426 - Battle of Detern, Fokko Ukena against Okko tom Brok
- 1427 - Battle of the Wild Fields, Fokko Ukena against Okko tom Brok
- 1433 - Battle of Bargebur, Fokko Ukena against Ulrich Cirksena

=== Division of Friesland ===
- 1496 - Battle of Sleat,
- 1498 - Battle of Laaxum, against Albert III, Duke of Saxony
- 1500 - Battle of Bomstersyl, against Albert III, Duke of Saxony
- 1514 - Battle of Hartwarden, against the count of Bremen (Christopher the Spendthrift of Brunswick and Lunenburg (Wolfenbüttel))

==== Saxon feud ====
- 1514 - Battle of Appingedam, Edzard the Great against the Holy Roman Empire
- 1515-1517 - rebellion of Grutte Pier, against the Dutch and Saxony
- 1517 - Battle of the Wremer Djip, resulting in the death of Tjede Peckes
- 1524 - Battle of Mulsum, last battle of the Land of Wursten against the archbishop of Bremen at Mulsum

=== Eighty Years' War ===
- 1568 - Battle of Heiligerlee, against the Spanish
- 1568 - Battle of Jemgum, against the Spanish
- 1586 - Battle of Boksum, against the Spanish
