= Tjede Peckes =

Germanic military flag bearer (c.1500–1517)

Tjede Peckes (c. 1500 – 23 December 1517) was a Wurster Frisian military flag bearer who was slain in the Battle of the Wremer Djip at age 17.

== Biography ==
Peckes was born around the year 1500 in Padingbüttel-Oberstrich as the daughter of a free farmer and became a member of a women's movement whose members saw themselves as successors to the virgines capitales, considered the four most important holy virgin martyrs of Christianity (Catherine of Alexandria, Barbara of Nicomedia, Margaret of Antioch and Dorothea of Caesarea). Peckes and her female contemporaries protested against the Church by choosing not to enter a monastery. (At that time, many young women went to the convent if they could not find a husband or had no prospect of work.) Although unmarried throughout their lives, these women took advantage of their circumstances to actively participate in political life. Peckes worked in the Wurster farmers' councils, which only allowed women to participate as if they were virgins.

By the end of 1517, the people of Wurster Frisians had acquired fertile new land by building embankments to hold back the North Sea. In response, the nearby Bremen archbishop Kristof of Braunschweig-Lüneburg proposed expanding his territory to include the new lands and imposing new taxes on the properties. When the farmers resisted, he sent a large army of mercenaries to put down the rebellion.

After bitter fighting, the climax was the Battle of the Wremer Deep (Wremer Djip). The battles involved not only men, but also a group of approximately 500 girls and women who stood up against the Bremen forces. Peckes carried the flag of the Frisians, which may have had an image of the dead on it. On 23 December 1517, Tjede Peckes was slain after being attacked by a soldier with a sword. She was seventeen years old when she died.

Holy Roman Emperor Maximilian I later regretted her death saying “Truly, it is a pity for this flag maiden, she could have become the mother of heroes.”

== Memorials ==
- A primary school in Wremen is named after her.
- Since 2001, the Lower Saxony Dike Museum in Dorum has been exhibiting a roughly life-sized statue of the "flag maiden."
- In Dorum, the ring-shaped road called Tjede-Peckes-Strasse runs through a new development area.
- A memorial plaque for Peckes was erected at Wremer Tief on 27 January 2007 as part of a ceremony held in Low German.
