= Emmelke =

River in Germany

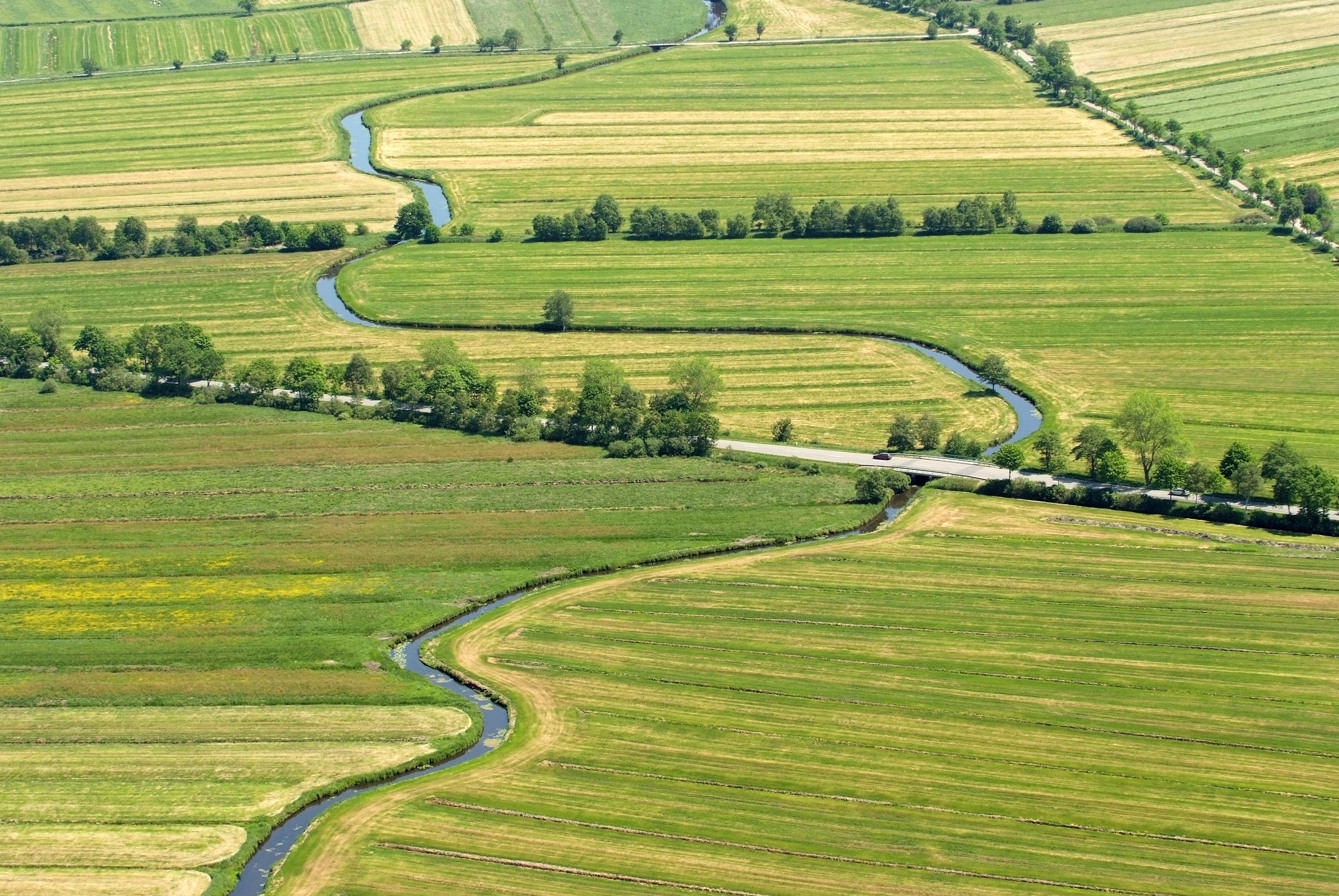
- The Emmelke at the Geestland district Krempel

Location
- Country: Germany
- State: Lower Saxony

Physical characteristics
- Mouth
  - location: Medem
  - coordinates: 53°44′39″N 8°55′5″E

Basin features
- Progression: Medem→ Elbe→ North Sea

Emmelke is a small river of Lower Saxony, Germany. It is a left tributary of the Medem, into which it flows in Ihlienworth.

== Course ==
The Emmelke originates near Wanhöden in the municipality of Wurster Nordseeküste, then flows eastward through Wanna and empties into the Medem near the municipality of Ihlienworth (Samtgemeinde Land Hadeln in the district of Cuxhaven). The Medem then flows for another 17 km before emptying into the Elbe funnel near Otterndorf.

== See also ==
- List of rivers of Lower Saxony
