= Organ of St. Peter and Paul in Cappel =

Historic organ in Cappel, Germany

Coordinates: 53°43′38.1″N 8°34′03.3″E

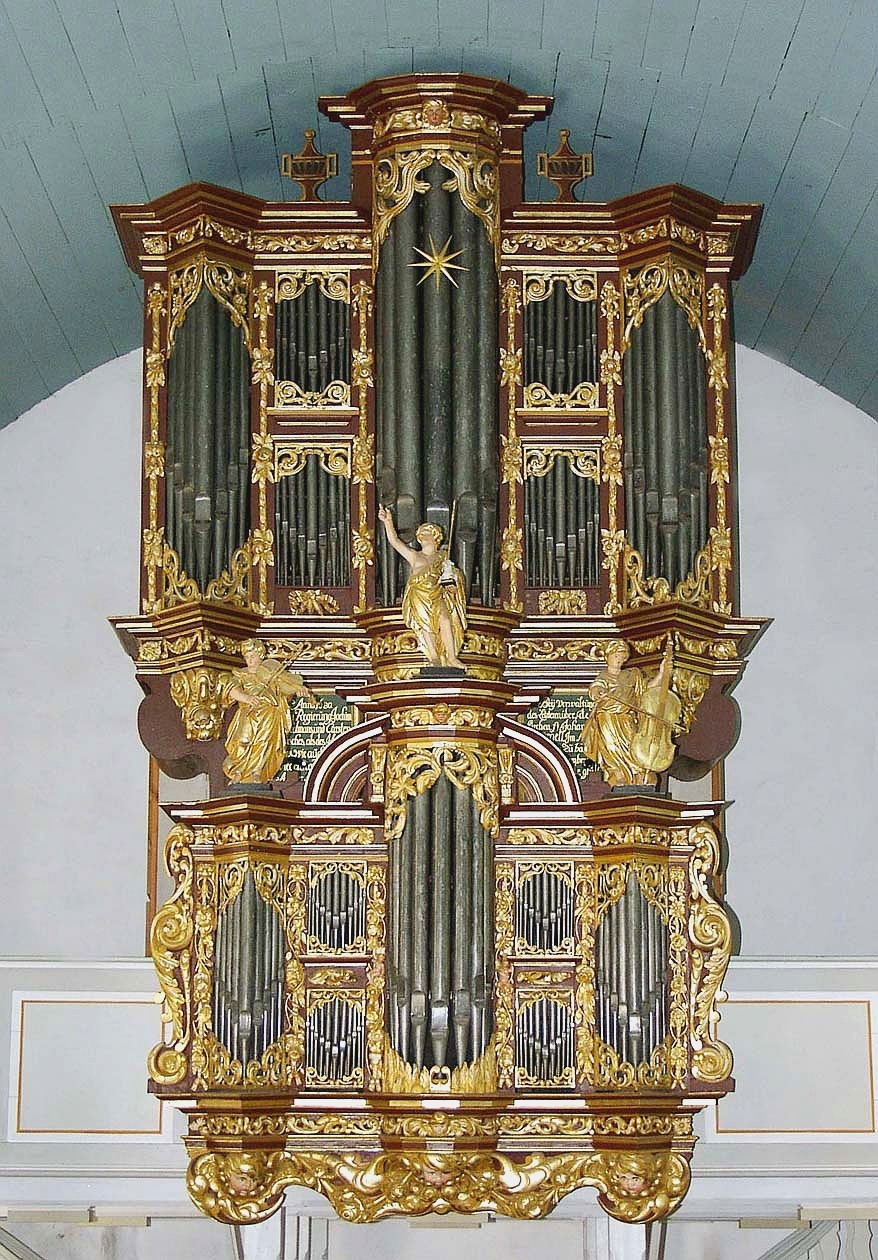
The Arp Schnitger Organ in Cappel

The organ of St. Peter and Paul in Cappel was built in 1680 by Arp Schnitger for the St. Johannis-Klosterkirche in Hamburg and has been in Cappel, Lower Saxony since 1816. It is considered to be the most complete and sonically best-preserved organ from the late 17th century in northern Germany. The instrument has two manuals with pedal and 30 stops, of which only two are not entirely old. Helmut Walcha's recordings of Bach's organ works (1950–1952) made this instrument world-famous.

== Building history ==
=== Construction by Schnitger in 1680 ===
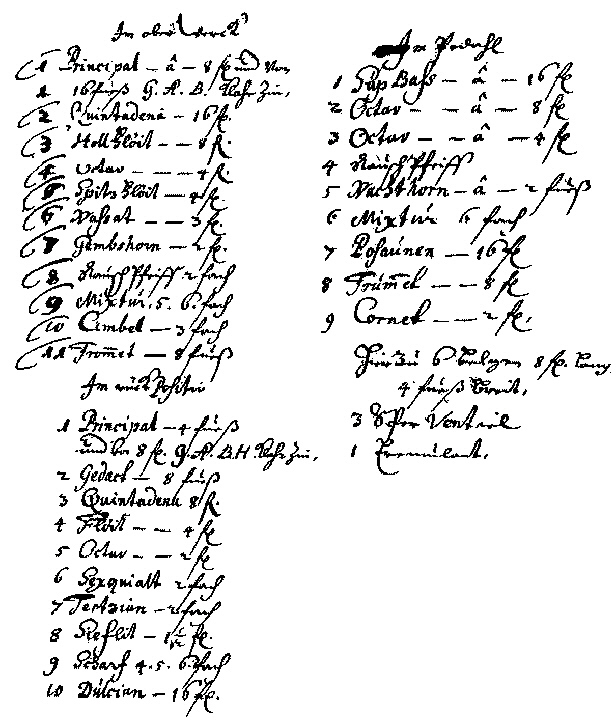
Schnitger's autograph disposition

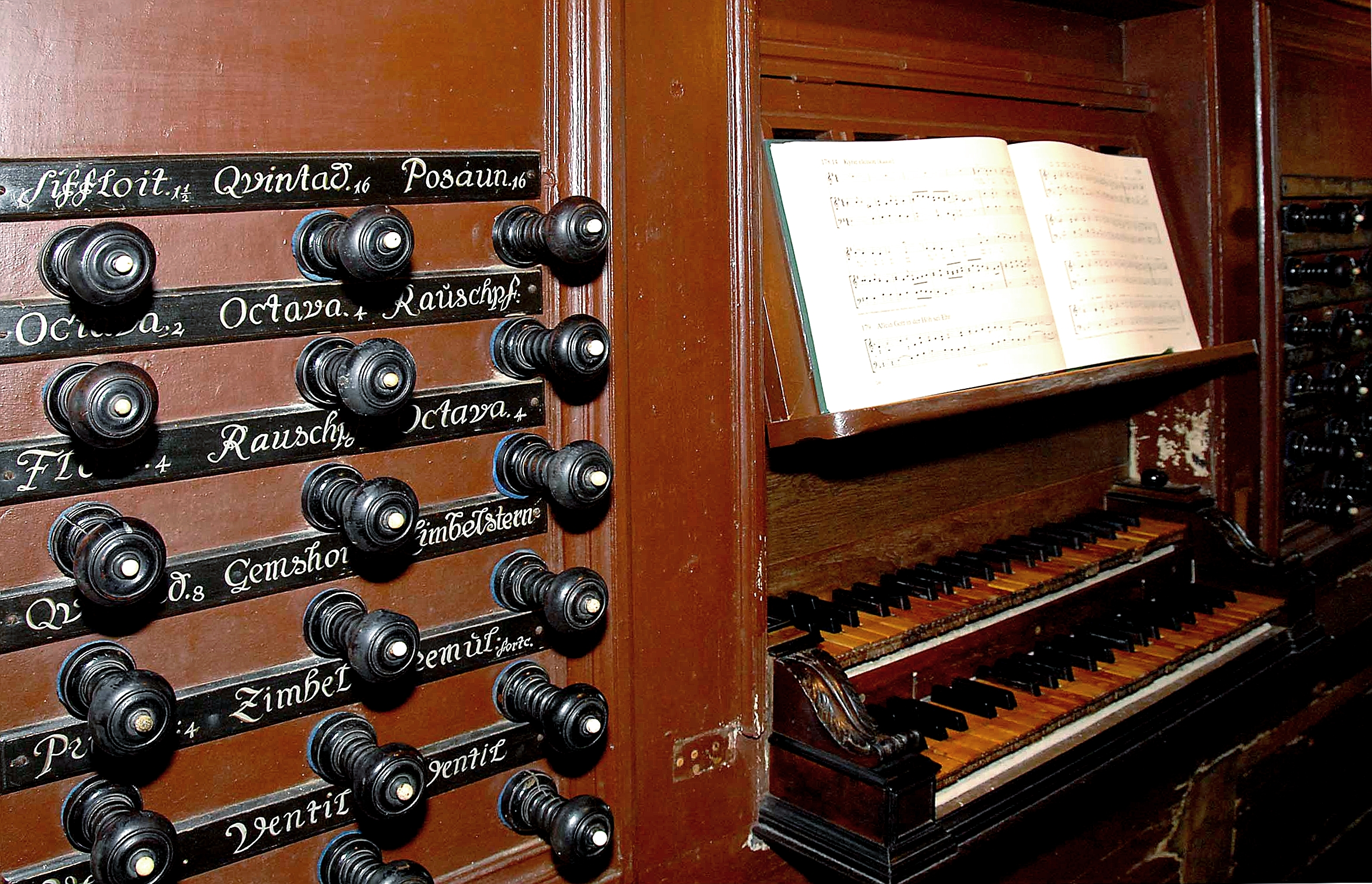
Organ console

The organ was originally built for the St. Johannis-Klosterkirche in Hamburg (on the site of today's Rathausmarkt). That church was part of a Dominican Abbey, whose buildings were re-used after the Reformation by the 'Gelehrtenschule des Johanneums' ('School of St John's Scholarship'). Well-known cantors of the school included Georg Philipp Telemann and Carl Philipp Emanuel Bach.

The contract was probably finalised in 1679. Schnitger's autograph disposition was rediscovered in 1989 in Basedow. The organ was built in Schnitger's workshop in Stade From April to December 1680, with Hauptwerk ('Great organ'), Rückpositiv ('Chair Organ') and pedal. The pedal was placed directly behind the Hauptwerk case, which had no rear wall. Schnitger used at least ten stops from the previous organ, an instrument of an unknown builder from the late Renaissance (probably from 1567). Schnitger integrated all the larger stopped registers into his organ.

The relatively broad cases of the Hauptwerk and Rückpositiv are both divided into five parts and are matching in shape. In both cases, the elevated polygonal central tower is connected to the lateral pointed towers by two-storey pipe-flats in which dummy pipes are used (as in the Schnitger organ in Nieuw Scheemda). The pointed side towers and flats of the two cases are respectively united under a common cornice in composite style. Elaborately designed mechanisms connect to the narrower lower case with the console. The richly decorated cornices, stands and friezes of the facade echo the appearance of the previous instrument, or perhaps parts of the old ornamentation were re-used. The new carving was created by the Hamburg sculptor Christian Precht. The detail of the pipe-shades features floral elements exclusively in the main case, but the Rückpositiv adds flowers, fruits, grimaces, stylized animal heads and – in the lower part of the Rückpositiv – three angel heads.

The case-pipes (along with those from the organ in Oederquart) are the only ones by Schnitger's hand that have completely survived today, their metal luckily not having been requisitioned in the 20th century for military purposes. Sonically they are characterized by an elegant and overtone-rich sound. The mixture stops reflect the tradition of Renaissance mixtures without high-pitched ranks in the treble. The rich variety of mixed sounds available mean that many plenum registrations are possible. The fact that Schnitger's pedal mixture (with its tiece rank) was preserved is unusual, since these were typically later replaced on other Schnitger organs, usually in line with contemporary tastes. Also unusual is the chromatic arrangement of the pipes on the free-standing pedal chest, which is explained by the slope of the western wall in St. Johannis. The fact that Schnitger adopted reed stops from older instruments is also unusual. Overall, the original intonation of Schnitger is largely preserved and has not been significantly changed by alterations and restorations.

=== Transfer to Cappel in 1816 by Georg Wilhelmy ===
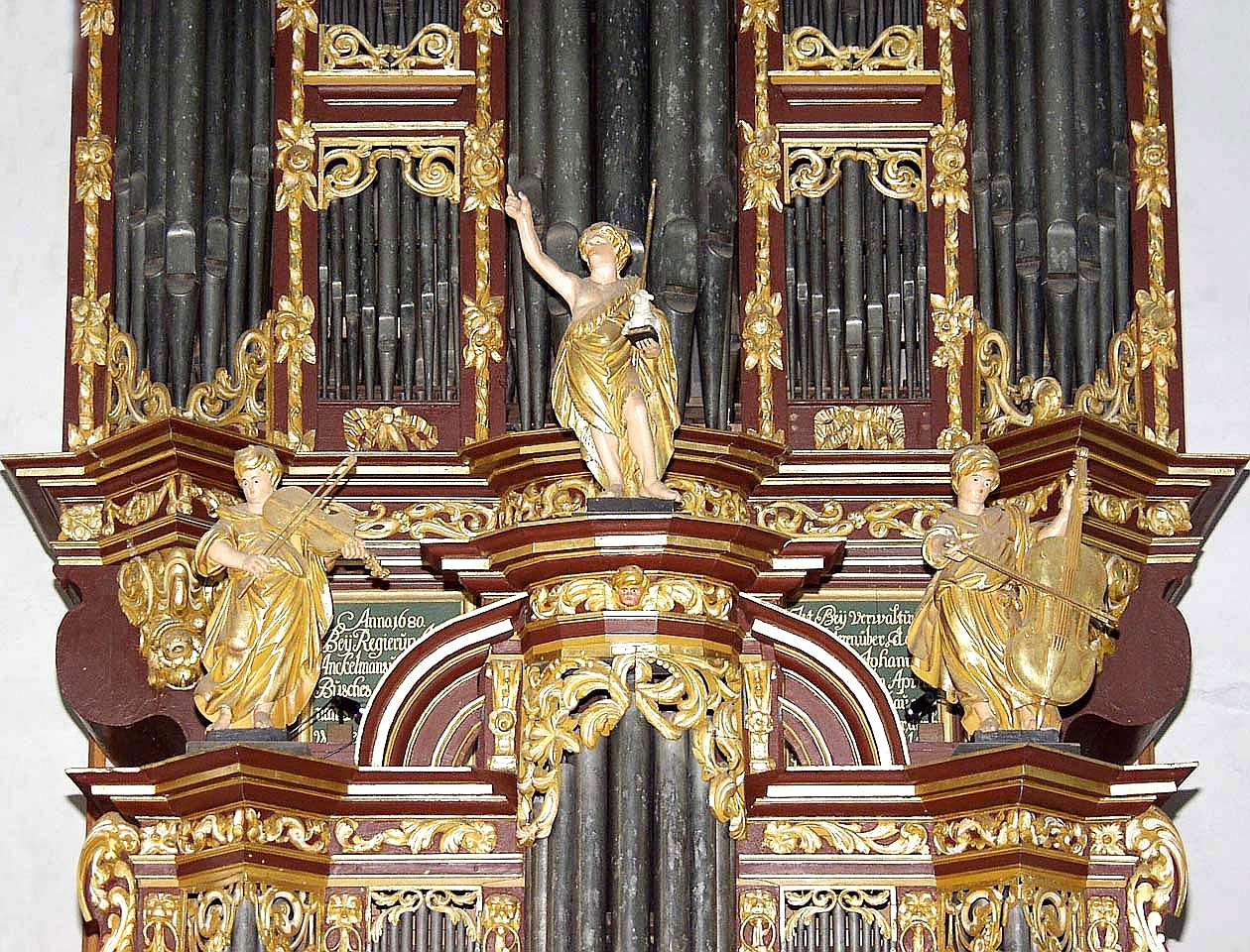
John the Baptist with two angels

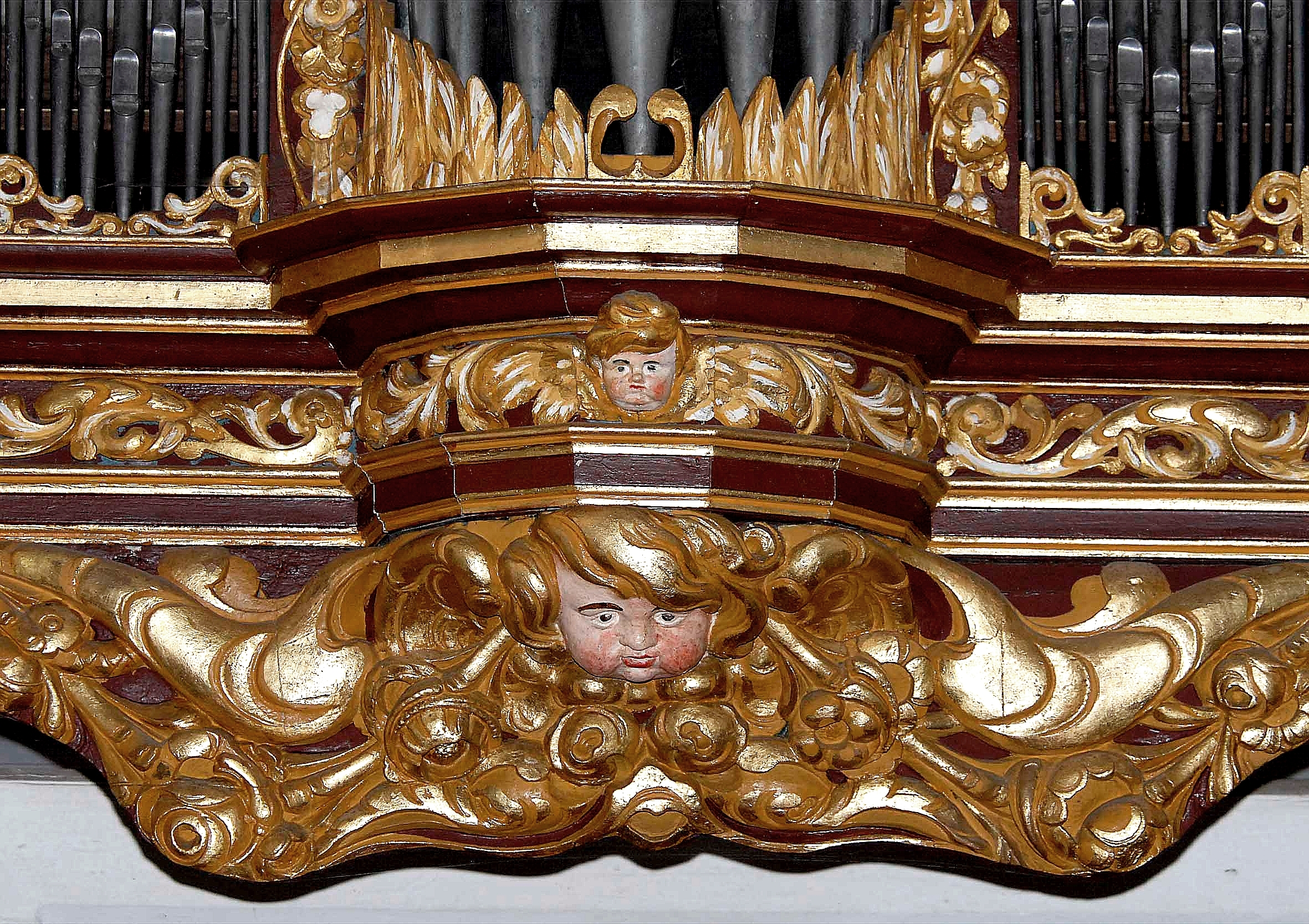
Lower part of the Rückpositiv

During the French occupation at the beginning of the 19th century, the monastery church in Hamburg served as a magazine. The organ was dismantled and stored in 1813 by Joachim Wilhelm Geycke; the Church was demolished in 1829, and later the monastery also. The organ was sold to Cappel by the Petrikirche in Hamburg for 600 Reichstaler. After a fire in 1810 a new church had been built in Cappel (1815–1816), but the community could not afford a new organ. A delegation from Cappel traveled to Hamburg on 16 June 1816 to collect the organ. Geycke and Johann Heinrich Wohlien packed the organ in wooden boxes, which were transported from Hamburg to Cuxhaven by ship. On June 29, 1816, the transfer of the organ was completed. Johann Georg Wilhelm Wilhelmy (Stade) signed a contract in which he undertook to rebuild the organ for 385 Reichstaler and set it up. The main case had to be shortened. For the flame ornaments in front of the feet of the front pipes in the middle tower of the Rückpositivs, which represent a stylistically strikingly foreign element, Wilhelmy used broken parts of carved angel wings, which are still missing from the angels on the Rückpositiv. The round segments next to the middle tower of the Rückpositiv are probably attributable to Wilhelmy. In addition, Wilhelmy was commissioned to install a Zimbelstern. Due to the lower ceiling height compared to Hamburg, the Christ and angel figures could no longer be placed on the main case and were instead used on the pulpit and altar. Since this alteration, John the Baptist, the middle figure on the Rückpositiv, no longer points with his index finger to the Christ figure, but into a void. In 1890, the Stade organ builder Johann Hinrich Röver replaced Schnitger's bellows with three large wedge bellows, resembling those of Schnitger in construction, providing a comparable breathing wind supply. Until 1927, the instrument was maintained by various organ workshops from Stade, without interfering with its historic substance.

=== Restorations ===
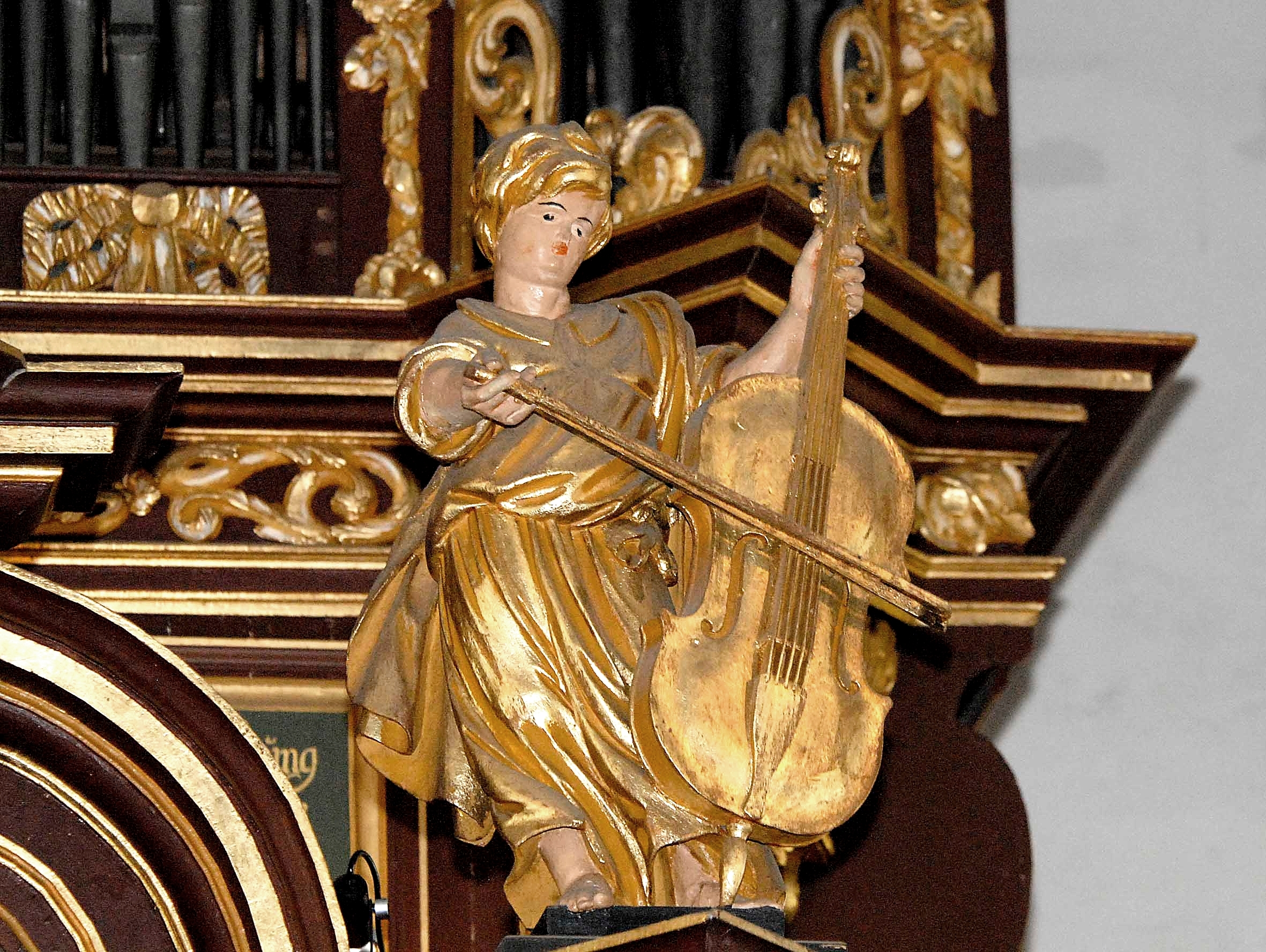
Viol playing angel

In 1928 Christhard Mahrenholz highlighted the special importance of the organ in a report and recommended a renovation and repair of those stops which were then unusable. For that year a purchase attempt is documented; further attempts followed between 1932 and 1935. In 1932, the organ workshop P. Furtwängler & Hammer built an electric blower.

From 1939 a first repair was made by Paul Ott, who also took care of the organ in 1950–1952 in the recordings of Helmut Walcha. In 1976/1977 the organ was repaired by Rudolf von Beckerath Orgelbau (Hamburg) after heating damage and the organ's historical substance was secured. The equal temperament from 1816 was maintained. The Cornet 2′ had to be supplemented with a new upper octave, as it had been converted into a trumpet 4′. The cymbale was restored to its original composition. In 2009, the bellows mechanism was restored by Beckerath and church back wall restored.

== Disposition ==
The actual state of the organ shows the original disposition:

I Rückpositiv CDE–c^{3}
Principal	4′	S
Gedact	8′	R
Quintadena	8′	S
Floit	4′	S
Octava	2′	S
Siffloit	1 1/2′	S
Sesquialtera II		S
Tertian II		S
Scharff IV–IV		S
Dulcian	16′	S

II Hauptwerk CDE–c^{3}
Principal	8′	S
Quintadena	16′	R
Hollfloit	8′	R
Octava	4′	R
Spitzfloit	4′	S
Nasat	3′	R
Gemshorn	2′	R
Rauschpfeife II		S
Mixtur V–VI		S
Cimbel III		B/S
Trompet	8′	R

Pedal CD–d^{1}
Untersatz	16′	R
Octava	8′	R
Octava	4′	S
Nachthorn	2′	S
Rauschpfeife II		S
Mixtur IV–VI		S
Posaun	16′	S
Trompet	8′	R
Cornet	2′	B/S

- Coupler: Manual coupler (W)
- Tremulant (B)
- Cimbelstern (R)

R = renaissance stops (1567?)
S = Schnitger (1680)
W = Wilhelmy (1816)
B = Beckerath (1977)

== Technical data ==
- 30 stops, 51 ranks of pipes
- Wind system:
  - 3 wedge bellows (Röver)
  - 3 check valves (ventils)
  - Wind pressure: 68 mm
- Windchests: Rückpositiv and Pedal (Schnitger), I Manual (Edskes)
- Mechanism/Action:
  - Keyboards: manuals (Schnitger), pedal (Beckerath)
  - Key action: Mechanical
  - Stop action: Mechanical
- Temperament:
  - equal temperament
  - Pitch: 1/2 tone above a1 = 440 Hz
