= Cappel, Lower Saxony =

Cappel
- Ortsteil of Wurster Nordseeküste
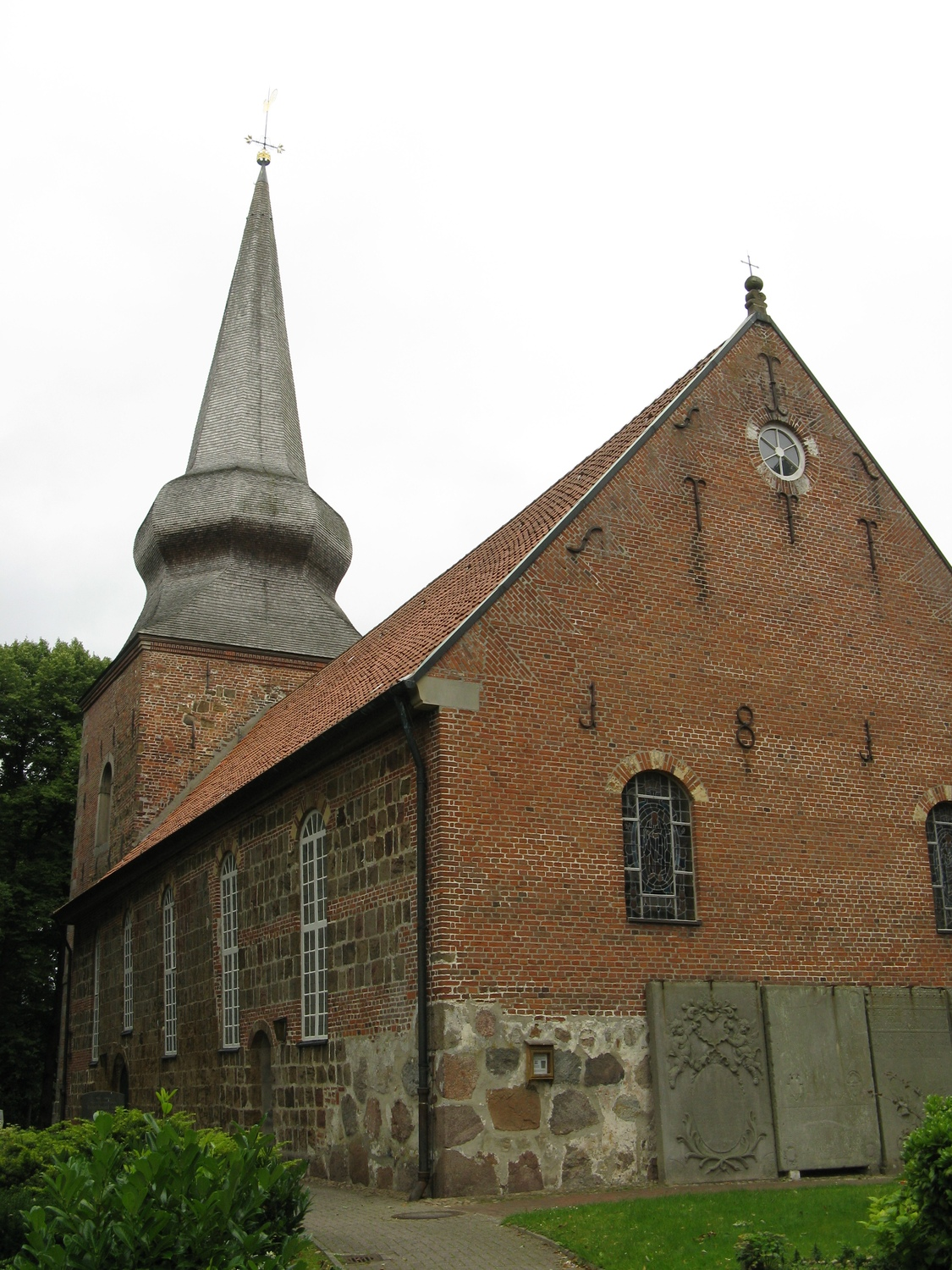
- Evangelical Lutheran Ss. Peter and Paul Church

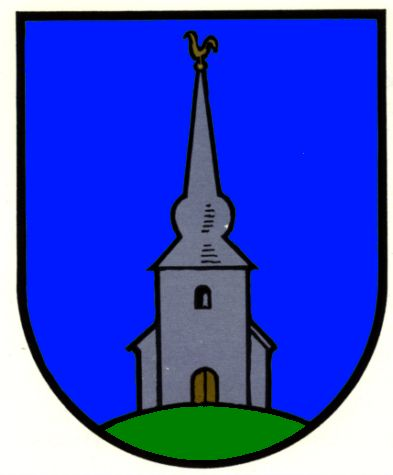
- Coat of arms
- Interactive map of Cappel
- Location within Germany Location within Lower Saxony
- Coordinates: 53°43′47″N 08°34′16″E
- Country: Germany
- State: Lower Saxony
- District: Cuxhaven
- Municipality: Wurster Nordseeküste

Area
  - Total: 8.25 km^{2} (3.19 sq mi)
- Elevation: 3 m (9.8 ft)

Population (2013-12-31)
  - Total: 705
  - Density: 85.5/km^{2} (221/sq mi)
- Time zone: UTC+01:00 (CET)
  - Summer (DST): UTC+02:00 (CEST)
- Postal codes: 27639
- Dialling codes: 04741
- Vehicle registration: CUX

Cappel (German pronunciation: [ˈkapl̩]) is a village and a former municipality in the district of Cuxhaven, in Lower Saxony, Germany. Since 1 January 2015 it is part of the municipality Wurster Nordseeküste.

== History ==
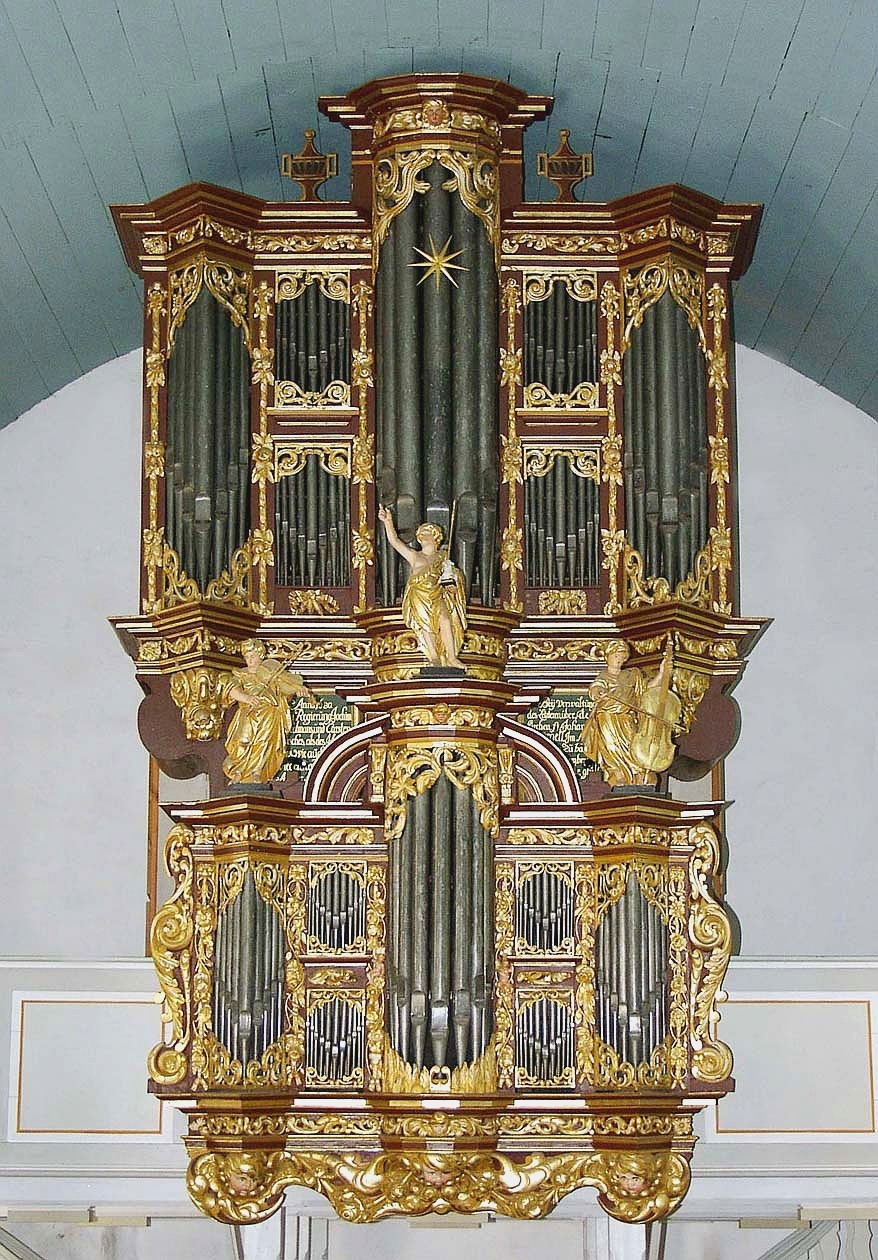
Ss.Peter and Paul Church: The pipe organ of 1680 by Arp Schnitger.

Cappel, a village in the Land of Wursten, for long periods a rather autonomous peasant republic, had long been claimed by the Prince-Archbishopric of Bremen, which finally subjected the Land of Wursten in 1524. In the mid-16th century the inhabitants adopted Lutheranism. During the Leaguist occupation under Tilly (1628–1630), they underwent attempts at re-Catholicisation. In 1648, the prince-archbishopric was transformed into the Duchy of Bremen, which was first ruled in personal union by the Swedish crown, interrupted by a Danish occupation (1712–1715), and from 1715 on by the House of Hanover. In 1807 the ephemeral Kingdom of Westphalia annexed the duchy, before France annexed it in 1810. In 1813, the duchy was restored to the Electorate of Hanover, which, after its upgrade to the Kingdom of Hanover in 1814, incorporated the duchy in a real union and the ducal territory, including Cappel, became part of the Stade Region, established in 1823.
