= Desert Fugue =

- Directed by: Will Fraser
- Production company: Fugue State Films
- Release date: 2010
- Running time: 90 minutes
- Country: United Kingdom

Desert Fugue is a 90-minute documentary film about Johann Sebastian Bach's The Art of Fugue directed by Will Fraser and produced by Fugue State Films. It features organist George Ritchie, Bach scholar Christoph Wolff and organ builders Ralph Richards and Bruce Fowkes.

In the film, Wolff outlines the history of The Art of Fugue, while Ritchie discusses his recording of the work, described by Gramophone magazine as "the finest recording of the Art of Fugue irrespective of media or instrument". Ritchie also talks about his teacher Helmut Walcha, and Walcha's completion of the unfinished final fugue.
