= Mulsum =

- Ortsteil of Wurster Nordseeküste
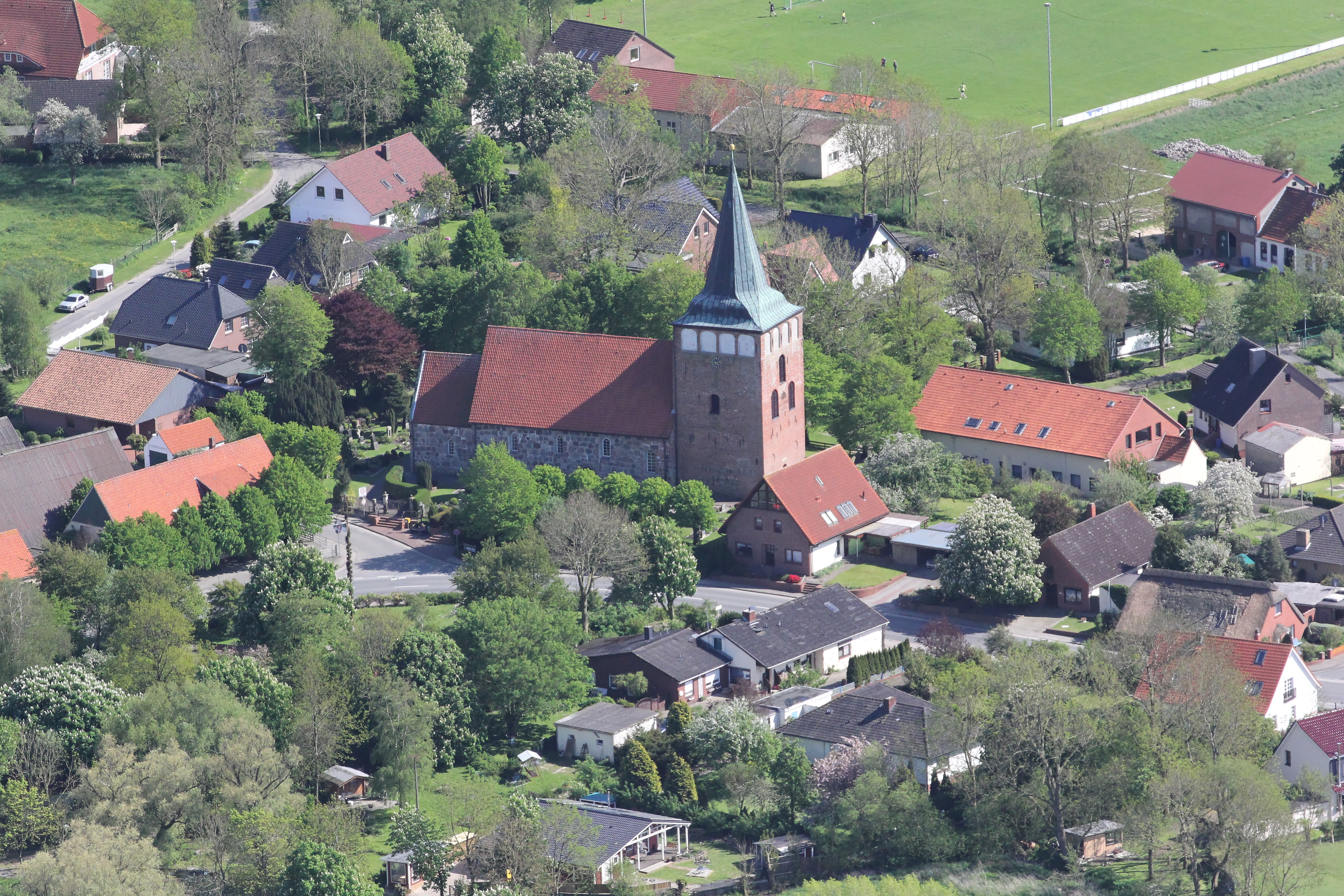
- Aerial view with St. Mary Church

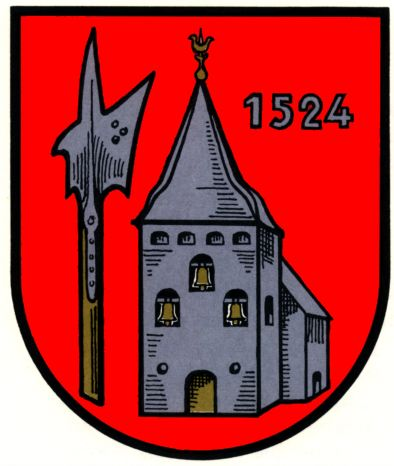
- Coat of arms
- Interactive map of Mulsum
- Location within Germany Location within Lower Saxony
- Coordinates: 53°40′N 08°33′E
- Country: Germany
- State: Lower Saxony
- District: Cuxhaven
- Municipality: Wurster Nordseeküste
- Subdivisions: 3 Ortschaften

Area
  - Total: 8.43 km^{2} (3.25 sq mi)
- Elevation: 3 m (9.8 ft)

Population (2013-12-31)
  - Total: 543
  - Density: 64.4/km^{2} (167/sq mi)
- Time zone: UTC+01:00 (CET)
  - Summer (DST): UTC+02:00 (CEST)
- Postal codes: 27639
- Dialling codes: 04742
- Vehicle registration: CUX

Mulsum (German pronunciation: [ˈmʊlzʊm]; Low German: Mulsen) is a village and a former municipality in the district of Cuxhaven, in Lower Saxony, Germany. Since 1 January 2015 it is part of the municipality Wurster Nordseeküste. It is located on Wurster Landstraße, L129, between Dorum to the north-east, and Wremen to the south-west. The town is two-and-a-half miles east of the North Sea.

The Land of Wursten, a rather autonomous farmers' republic including Mulsum, had long been claimed by the Prince-Archbishopric of Bremen, until in 1524 it could be definitely be subjected. In 1648 the Prince-Archbishopric was transformed into the Duchy of Bremen, which was first ruled in personal union by the Swedish and from 1715 on by the Hanoverian Crown. In 1823 the Duchy was abolished and its territory became part of the Stade Region.
