= George Ritchie (organist) =

American organist

George Ritchie is an American organist. His teachers included Helmut Walcha, and like Walcha he is best known for his interpretations of Johann Sebastian Bach's music. Ritchie has recorded Bach's complete organ works, and his recording of Bach's Art of Fugue was reviewed in Gramophone Magazine as 'the finest recording of the Art of Fugue irrespective of media or instrument'. This recording also includes Ritchie's performance of Walcha's completion of the unfinished final fugue. He discusses this recording in the documentary film Desert Fugue.
