= Christoph Wolff =

German-born musicologist

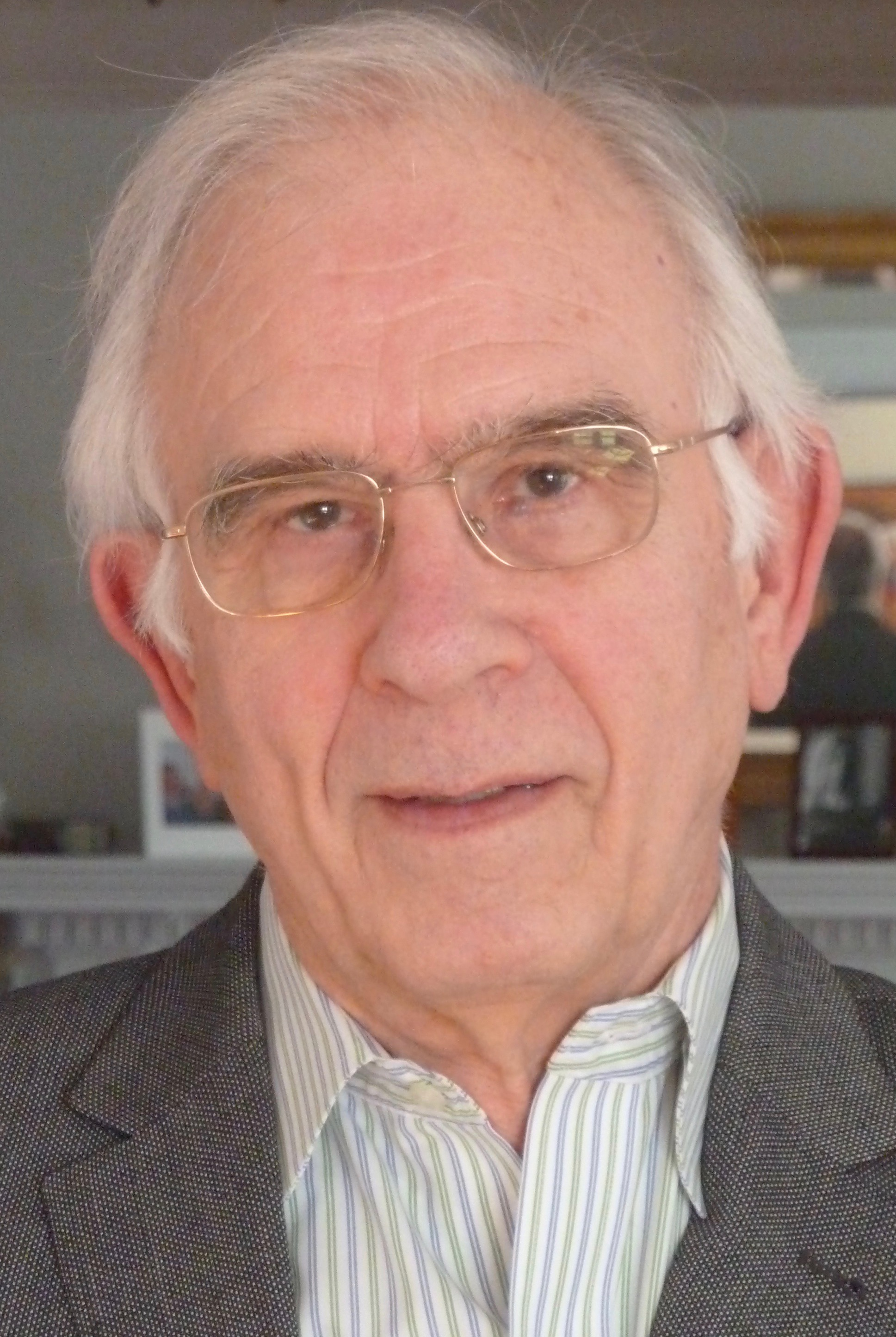
- Wolff in 2016
- Born: 24 May 1940 (age 86); Solingen, Germany
- Education: Free University Berlin; University of Erlangen; Hochschule für Musik Freiburg
- Occupation: Musicologist
- Organizations: University of Erlangen; University of Toronto; Princeton University; Columbia University; Harvard University; Bach Archive
- Awards: Royal Academy of Music Bach Prize

Christoph Wolff (born 24 May 1940) is a German-born music historian and musicologist specializing in the music of the seventeenth and eighteenth centuries, particularly the life and works of Johann Sebastian Bach and Wolfgang Amadeus Mozart. Regarded as one of the world's foremost Bach scholars, he has made significant contributions to historical musicology, source studies, musical biography, editorial scholarship, and the study of Baroque and Classical music.

Wolff served on the faculty of Harvard University from 1976 until his retirement in 2012 and is Adams University Professor Emeritus. He previously held the William Powell Mason Professorship of Music and served in several senior academic leadership positions, including Chair of Harvard's Department of Music, Acting Director of the Harvard University Library, and Dean of the Graduate School of Arts and Sciences. Internationally, he served as Director of the Leipzig Bach Archive from 2001 to 2013 and held leadership positions in numerous scholarly organizations devoted to historical musicology.

== Life and career ==
Wolff was born in Solingen, the son of theologian Hans Walter Wolff. He studied organ, historical keyboard instruments, musicology, and art history at the Hochschule für Musik Berlin (today University of the Arts), the Free University of Berlin, the University of Erlangen, and the Hochschule für Musik Freiburg. He received a performance diploma in organ and historical keyboard instruments at the Hochschule in Berlin in 1963 and completed a doctorate in musicology at the University of Erlangen in 1966.

After teaching at the University of Erlangen, Wolff joined the University of Toronto in 1968 before accepting a faculty appointment at Columbia University in 1970. He also held visiting appointments at Princeton University before joining the Harvard faculty in 1976 as Professor of Music.

At Harvard, Wolff was appointed William Powell Mason Professor of Music in 1984. Beyond his scholarly work, he assumed numerous academic leadership roles, serving as Chair of the Department of Music from 1980 to 1988 and again from 1990 to 1991. In 1991–92 he was Acting Director of the Harvard University Library, and from 1992 to 2000 served as Dean of the Graduate School of Arts and Sciences. In recognition of his interdisciplinary scholarship and academic leadership, he was appointed Adams University Professor, Harvard's highest academic distinction, in 2001. He retired from full-time teaching in 2012 and is Adams University Professor Emeritus. Throughout his Harvard career he also served as Curator of the Isham Memorial Library, one of the leading research collections for historical musicology.

Outside Harvard, Wolff has held academic appointments and leadership positions. Since 1989 he has been Honorary Professor at the University of Freiburg. Between 2010 and 2018 he served on the Graduate Faculty of the Juilliard School. From 2001 to 2013 he was President of the Bach Archive Foundation and Director of the Bach Archive in Leipzig, the world's foremost research centre devoted to Johann Sebastian Bach. He also served as President of the Répertoire International des Sources Musicales (RISM) from 2004 to 2013 and chaired the Akademie für Mozart-Forschung in Salzburg from 1996 to 2006.

== Scholarship and research ==
Wolff's scholarship encompasses primarily the music, intellectual history, and documentary sources of the seventeenth through early nineteenth centuries, but he also engaged in musical research from the late Middle Ages through the early 20^{th} century. His scholarship integrates musicology with philosophy, theology, cultural and social history, architecture, and archival studies, emphasizing the relationship between musical composition, performance, and broader intellectual traditions.

He is particularly noted for transforming modern Bach scholarship. His studies have combined manuscript analysis, archival research, source criticism, and historical reconstruction to illuminate Bach's compositional process, working methods, education, spiritual outlook, and professional life. He served on the editorial board of the Neue Bach-Ausgabe, the new critical edition of Bach’s works (completed in 2008), to which he contributed several volumes. His biography Johann Sebastian Bach: The Learned Musician is widely regarded as one of the definitive scholarly biographies of the composer and has been translated into numerous languages. Its companion volume, Bach's Musical Universe, focuses on the composer’s steady output of transformational works.

Wolff has also made important contributions to Mozart scholarship, especially concerning the composer's final years, creative development, and unfinished works. His research on Mozart's Requiem has become a standard reference, while Mozart at the Gateway to His Fortune re-examines Mozart's Viennese career through newly interpreted documentary and musical evidence, challenging the notion of Mozart’s decline and inevitable early end.His work has similarly advanced scholarship on eighteenth-century performance practice, musical patronage, editorial methodology, and source studies.

Among his most significant scholarly achievements was his role in identifying previously unknown Bach works in a manuscript at Yale University in 1984 and helping to locate the long-lost estate of Carl Philipp Emanuel Bach in Kyiv in 1999, discoveries that substantially expanded available primary sources for Bach research.

== Media ==
In addition to his academic publications, Wolff has contributed extensively to public understanding of classical music through documentary films, broadcast interviews, public lectures, and educational media. Wolff appeared as a featured commentator in the documentary Desert Fugue, discussing Johann Sebastian Bach's The Art of Fugue and its enduring significance within the Western musical canon. He has also participated in documentary productions and educational broadcasts produced by organizations including the BBC, PBS, WGBH, and the Bach Archive Leipzig, where he has discussed Bach scholarship, archival discoveries, and eighteenth-century musical culture.

Beyond documentary work, Wolff has delivered numerous public lectures at universities, libraries, museums, and music festivals throughout Europe, North America, and Southeast Asia. His lectures have addressed subjects including Bach's sacred and instrumental music, Mozart's creative development, historical keyboard traditions, musical source studies, and the role of archival research in musicology. Many of these presentations have been recorded and made available through university lecture series and educational media platforms.

Wolff has also been featured in interviews accompanying major exhibitions, concert series, anniversary commemorations, and scholarly conferences. His expertise has been sought by orchestras, early music ensembles, and cultural institutions in connection with performances of major Baroque and Classical works, particularly those of Johann Sebastian Bach.

== Awards and recognition ==
He was elected to the American Academy of Arts and Sciences (1982), the Saxon Academy of Sciences at Leipzig (2001), and the American Philosophical Society (2002). In 2015 he became a member of the German Order Pour le Mérite for Sciences and Arts, Germany's highest honour for scholarly and artistic achievement.

His honorary doctorates include those from the New England Conservatory (1999), Valparaiso University (2002), the Friedrich Schiller University Jena and the Hochschule für Musik “Franz Liszt” Weimar (2005), Middlebury College (2012), and Oberlin College (2018). He also holds honorary professorships at the University of Freiburg and the National Music Academy in Lviv.

Among his major awards are the Dent Medal of the International Musicological Society (1978), the Humboldt Research Prize (1996), the Otto Kinkeldey Award of the American Musicological Society (2001), the Harrison Medal of the Society for Musicology in Ireland (2004), the Royal Academy of Music Bach Prize (2006), the Knight Commander's Cross of the Order of Merit of the Federal Republic of Germany (2016), and the Bach Medal of the City of Leipzig (2021). He has also received honorary membership in the Mozarteum Foundation Salzburg, the American Musicological Society, and both the American and German Bach Societies.

== Selected publications ==
- Wolff, Christoph (1968). Der stile antico in der Musik Johann Sebastian Bachs: Studien zu Bachs Spätwerk (in German). F. Steiner.
- Wolff, Christoph (1991). Bach: Essays on His Life and Music. Harvard University Press. ISBN 978-0-674-05926-9.
- Wolff, Christoph (1994). Mozart's Requiem: Historical and Analytical Studies, Documents, Score. University of California Press. ISBN 978-0-520-07709-6.
- David, Hans T. (1998). Wolff, Christoph (ed.). New Bach Reader. W. W. Norton & Company. ISBN 978-0-393-31956-9.
- Brinkmann, Reinhold; Wolff, Christoph (1999). Driven Into Paradise: the Musical Migration from Nazi Germany to the United States. University of California Press.
- Wolff, Christoph (2002). Johann Sebastian Bach: The Learned Musician. Oxford University Press. ISBN 978-0-19-924884-1.
- Brinkmann, Reinhold; Wolff, Christoph; Lewin, David (2000). "Music of My Future": The Schoenberg Quartets and Trio. Harvard University Department of Music. ISBN 978-0-9640317-1-5.
- Zepf, Markus; Wolff, Christoph (2 April 2012). The Organs of J.S. Bach: A Handbook. University of Illinois Press. ISBN 978-0-252-07845-3.
- Wolff, Christoph (29 May 2012). Mozart At the Gateway To His Fortune: Serving The Emperor 1788 To 1791. WW Norton. ISBN 978-0-393-05070-7.
- Wolff, Christoph (24 March 2020). Bach's Musical Universe: The Composer and His Work. W. W. Norton & Company. ISBN 978-0-393-65179-9.
