= Helmut Walcha =

German organist (1907–1991)

- Helmut Walcha, c. 1960
- Born: 27 October 1907; Leipzig, Germany
- Died: 11 August 1991; Frankfurt, Germany
- Occupations: Organist; Harpsichordist; Composer; Pedagogue

Helmut Harrison Walcha (27 October 1907 – 11 August 1991) was a blind German organist, harpsichordist, music teacher and composer who specialized in the works of the Dutch and German Baroque masters.

Blind since his teenage years, he is known for his recordings of the complete organ works of Johann Sebastian Bach, entirely played from memory.

== Biography ==
Walcha was born on 27 October 1907 in Leipzig, Germany. After being vaccinated for smallpox at a young age, his eyesight slowly worsened until he became fully blind at age 19. Despite his disability, he entered the Leipzig Conservatory and became an assistant at the Thomaskirche to Günther Ramin, who was professor of organ at the conservatory and Thomaskantor (a position held by Bach himself). Some two decades later, Ramin would teach another renowned Bach interpreter and organist, Karl Richter. In 1929, Walcha accepted a position in Frankfurt am Main at the Friedenskirche and remained in Frankfurt for the rest of his life. From 1933 to 1938 he taught at the Hoch Conservatory. In 1938 he was appointed professor of organ at the Musikhochschule in Frankfurt and organist of the Dreikönigskirche in 1946. He retired from public performance in 1981 and died in Frankfurt on 11 August 1991.

Walcha recorded Bach's complete solo keyboard works twice, once in mono (1947–52) and in stereo from 1956 to 1971. The former (mono) cycle has been digitally re-mastered and re-issued as a 10-CD boxed set. This latter stereo cycle (released 10 September 2001), has been remastered, and repackaged in a 12-CD box. This edition also contains the recording of his own conclusion of the last fugue of The Art of Fugue - previously unreleased.

Walcha's completion of the last fugue of The Art of Fugue was also recorded by his former pupil George Ritchie as part of Ritchie's recording the work, released in 2010.

Walcha also composed for the organ. He published four volumes of original chorale preludes (published by C. F. Peters and recorded in part by, for example, Renate Meierjürgen) as well as arrangements for organ of orchestral works written by others.

He lectured on organ music and composition (illustrated by his own playing) at the Hoch Conservatory and the Frankfurt Musikhochschule. One other contribution to music scholarship is his attempted completion of the final (unfinished) fugue of The Art of Fugue.

Walcha taught many significant American organists of the twentieth century who travelled to Germany (some of them as Fulbright scholars): these include Robert Anderson, David Boe, Margaret Leupold Dickinson, Melvin Dickinson, Delbert Disselhorst, Betty Louise Lumby, Paul Jordan, David Mulbury, Fenner Douglass, Jane Douglass, Ray P. Ferguson, Grigg and Helen Fountain, Barbara Harbach, Charles Krigbaum, J. Reilly Lewis, George Ritchie, Margaret Vardell Sandresky, and Russell Saunders - all of whom became major teachers and performers after their studies abroad.

A section of the documentary film Desert Fugue is about Walcha, and explains how he memorised music part by part, and passed on this method of learning counterpoint to his pupils.

== Selected works ==
=== Recordings ===
==== Works by others ====
Walcha's opus magnum is the recording of the entire organ works by Johann Sebastian Bach, which he recorded both in mono (1947–52) and stereo (1956–71) for Archiv Produktion (a subsidiary of Deutsche Grammophon). The original mono cycle was Archiv's first release and included an improvisation by Walcha at the Organ of St. Peter and Paul in Cappel, built by Arp Schnitger in 1680; Walcha also used the Stellwagen Organ in St Jacob Church in Lübeck (built in 1636–37 by Friederich Stellwagen by extending the previous ca. 1480 organ, one of Stellwagen's most appreciated works). The stereo cycle was the first stereo recording made by Deutsche Grammophon and was reissued including Walcha's recording of The Art of Fugue, comprehensive of Walcha's own completion of the last fugue.

- Bach: Organ Works. Performed by Helmut Walcha. 12-CD set. Archiv Produktion (Deutsche Grammophon), Catalog No. 463712 ("Walcha's Bach holds a similar place in the annals of recording to Fischer-Dieskau's Schubert, Toscanini's Verdi, and Gieseking's Debussy." --)
- Bach: Great Organ Works. Performed by Helmut Walcha. 2-CD set. Deutsche Grammophon, Double Catalog No. 453064 (one disc with Walcha playing the organ of St. Laurenskerk in Alkmaar and the other with him playing the organ of Saint-Pierre-le-Jeune in Strasbourg).
- Orgelmeister vor Bach • The Early German organ School • Les Maitres de l'Orgue avant Bach. 4-LP set. Archiv Produktion (DGG), 1977, Catalog No. 2723 055. Helmut Walcha at the Arp Schnitger organ in Cappel. Works of Georg Böhm, Nicolaus Bruhns, Dietrich Buxtehude, Vincent Lübeck, Johann Pachelbel, Samuel Scheidt, Jan Pieterszoon Sweelinck, and Franz Tunder.

Helmut Walcha has also recorded most of Bach's harpsichord works (the English and French Suites, the Goldberg Variations, Partitas, the Italian Concerto, 15 Inventions and 15 Sinfonias, the Well-Tempered Clavier) for EMI. These recordings are still available from EMI-Toshiba (Japan) as well as from Warner. The Well-Tempered Clavier and the Goldberg Variations are also available in Europe in a 5-CD set. He also recorded The Well-Tempered Clavier for Deutsche Grammophon, using a Ruckers cembalo for the first book and a Hemsch for the second book. This recording is only available in the Far East (Korea, Japan).

Walcha's selection from the organ works of Dietrich Buxtehude was later reissued in a single CD release:

- Dietrich Buxtehude: Orgelwerke • Organ Works. CD. Archiv Produktion, 1989, Catalog No. 427 133–2. Includes BuxWV 157, 159, 140 to 142, 145, 146, 149, 159 to 161 (the latter being Buxtehude's most famous work Passacaglia in D minor).

All Walcha's recordings, including other recordings of Bach works for Archiv, Deutsche Grammophon and Philips Records (harpsichord works, etc.), were reissued in 2021 by Deutsche Grammophon to mark the 30th anniversary of Walcha's death.

- Helmut Walcha: The Complete Recordings on Archiv Produktion. 32-CD set. Deutsche Grammophon, 2021, Catalog No. 483 9949.
  - CD 1–13: J. S. Bach: Complete Works for Organ. The Stereo Cycle (1956–1971).
  - CD 14–23: J. S. Bach: Complete Works for Organ. The Mono Cycle (1947–1952).
  - CD 24–27: J. S. Bach: The Well-Tempered Clavier, Bks. I & II (BWV 846–893).
  - CD 28–29: J. S. Bach: Sonatas for Violin and Harpsichord (BWV 1014–1019). Helmut Walcha, harpsichord / Henryk Szeryng, violin.
  - CD 30–32: Organ Masters Before Bach. Reprint of the aforementioned 4-LP set "The Early German Organ School".

==== Works by Walcha ====
Walcha's original chorales and organ works have been recorded twice. Firstly, a selection performed by Renate Meierjürgen; and then, the full 88 chorale preludes, by Wolfgang Rübsam and Delbert Disselhorst.

- Helmut Walcha: Choralvorspiele. Renate Meierjürgen an der Orgel der Dreikönigskirche, Frankfurt. Motette Ursina, 1980 (CD digital remastering 2011), Catalog No. M 1039 (LP) & MOT 10391 (CD).
- Helmut Walcha: Chorale Preludes, vol. 1. Wolfgang Rübsam at the John Brombaug Organ Opus 35, First Presbyterian Church, Springfield, Illinois. 2-CD set. Naxos (series The Organ Encyclopedia), 2012, Catalog No. 8.572910.
- Helmut Walcha: Chorale Preludes, vol. 2. Wolfgang Rübsam at the John Brombaug Organ Opus 35, First Presbyterian Church, Springfield, Illinois. 2-CD set. Naxos (series The Organ Encyclopedia), 2012, Catalog No. 8.572911.
- Helmut Walcha: Chorale Preludes, vol. 3. Delbert Disselhorst at the John Brombaug Organ Opus 35, First Presbyterian Church, Springfield, Illinois. 2-CD set. Naxos (series The Organ Encyclopedia), 2013, Catalog No. 8.572912.
- Helmut Walcha: Chorale Preludes, vol. 4. Delbert Disselhorst at the John Brombaug Organ Opus 35, First Presbyterian Church, Springfield, Illinois. 2-CD set. Naxos (series The Organ Encyclopedia), 2013, Catalog No. 8.572913.

Finally, Walcha's completion of "Contrapunctus 18 (Fuga a 4 Soggetti)", i.e. the last fugue of Bach's The Art of Fugue, was recorded by Walcha himself for his stereo cycle of Bach's complete organ works, and again by his former pupil George Ritchie:

- J. S. Bach: The Organ Works. CD 6, track 11: The Art of Fugue, BWV 1080: Contrapunctus 18 in D minor. Archiv Produktion, 2000, Catalog No. 463712. Performed by Helmut Walcha at the Van Hagerbeer/Schnitger organ of the Grote or Sint-Laurenskerk, Alkmaar, The Netherlands.
- J. S. Bach: The Art of Fugue. CD 2: Contrapunctus 18 (Fuga a 4 Soggetti). In: Desert Fugue, by Will Fraser – George Ritchie. 2 CD + 1 DVD. Raven CD – Fugue State Films, 2010, Catalog No. FSF-0001. Performed by George Ritchie at the Richard, Fowkes & Co. organ, Pinnacle Presbyterian Church, Scottsdale, Arizona.

=== Scores for transcriptions and original works ===
Walcha's editions of Händel's organ concertos opp. 4 & 7, as well as his organ transcriptions of Bach's "Ricercare a 6 voci" from the Musical Offering and the complete transcription for organ of the Art of Fugue (including the final fugue completed by Walcha), have been published by Schott Music and Edition Peters. Bach's "Ricercare a 6 voci" edition also includes an analysis.

- G. F. Händel: Orgelkonzerte op. 4, Nos. 1–6. B. Schott's Söhne, Mainz, 1940.
- G. F. Händel: Orgelkonzerte op. 7, Nos. 1–6. B. Schott's Söhne, Mainz, 1943.
- J. S. Bach: „Ricercare à 6 voci“ aus dem „Musikalischen Opfer“. Übertragung für Orgel (mit ausführlicher Analyse). Edition Peters, Frankfurt a. M., 1964, Catalog No. EP4835.
- J. S. Bach: „Die Kunst der Fuge“. BWV 1080. Übertragung für Orgel mit Weiterführung und Beendigung der Schlussfuge. Edition Peters, Frankfurt a. M., 1967, Catalog No. EP8000.

The latter editor also published the scores of Walcha's 88 original chorale preludes, in four volumes:

- Helmut Walcha: Choralvorspiele, Bd. 1. Edition Peters, Frankfurt a. M., 1954, Catalog No. EP4850. 25 chorale preludes for organ; prelude no. 11, Erhalt uns, Herr, bei deinem Wort (Maintain us, Lord, in Thy word), uses the same Lutheran melody used by Bach in cantatas BWV 6 and BWV 126 (1725).
- Helmut Walcha: Choralvorspiele, Bd. 2. Edition Peters, Frankfurt a. M., 1963, Catalog No. EP4871. 20 chorale preludes for organ.
- Helmut Walcha: Choralvorspiele, Bd. 3. Edition Peters, Frankfurt a. M., 1966, Catalog No. EP5999. 24 chorale preludes for organ.
- Helmut Walcha: Choralvorspiele, Bd. 4. Edition Peters, Frankfurt a. M., 1978, Catalog No. EP8413. 19 chorale preludes for organ + a postludium.
