= Wurster Nordseeküste =

- Municipality
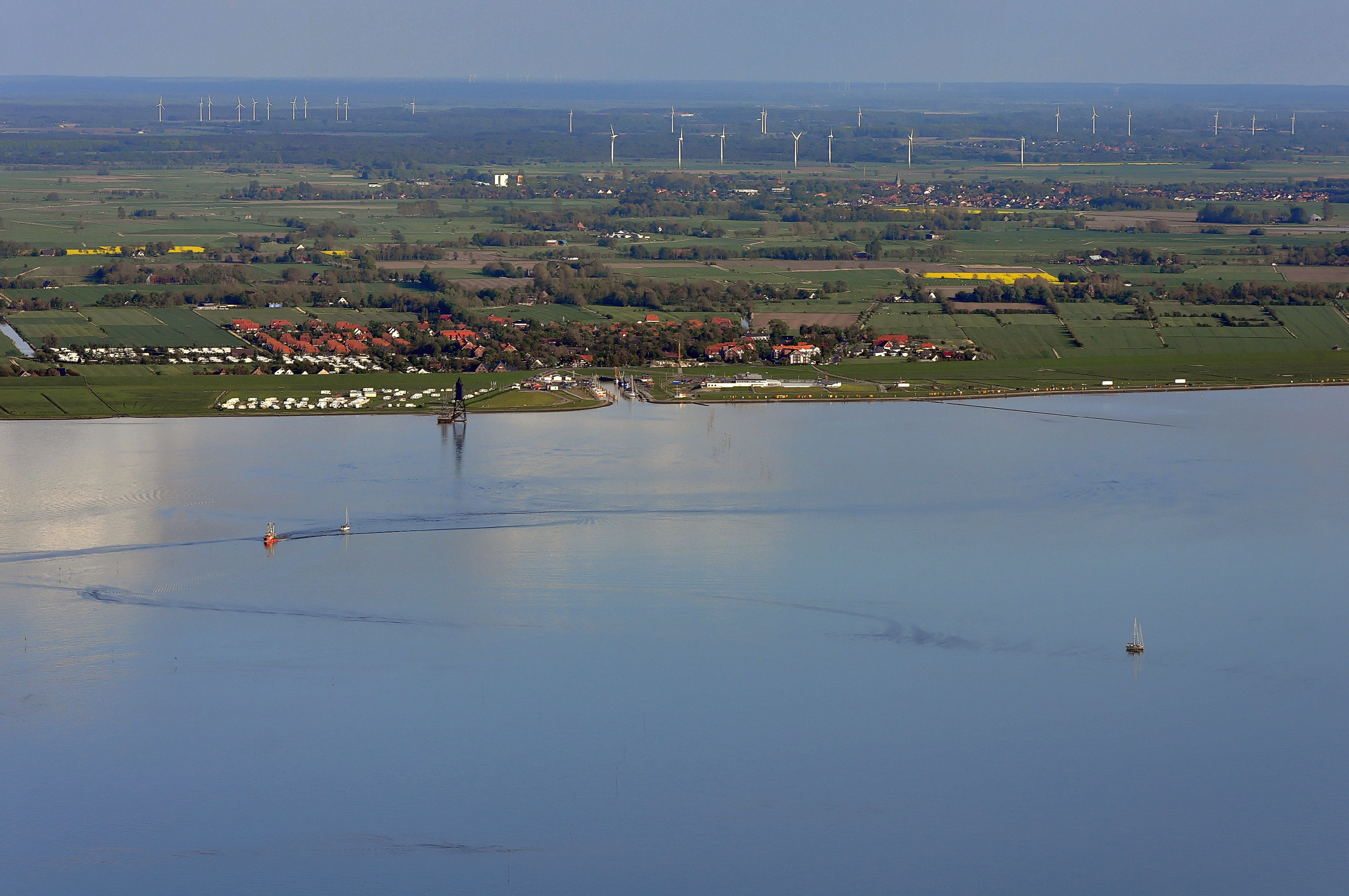

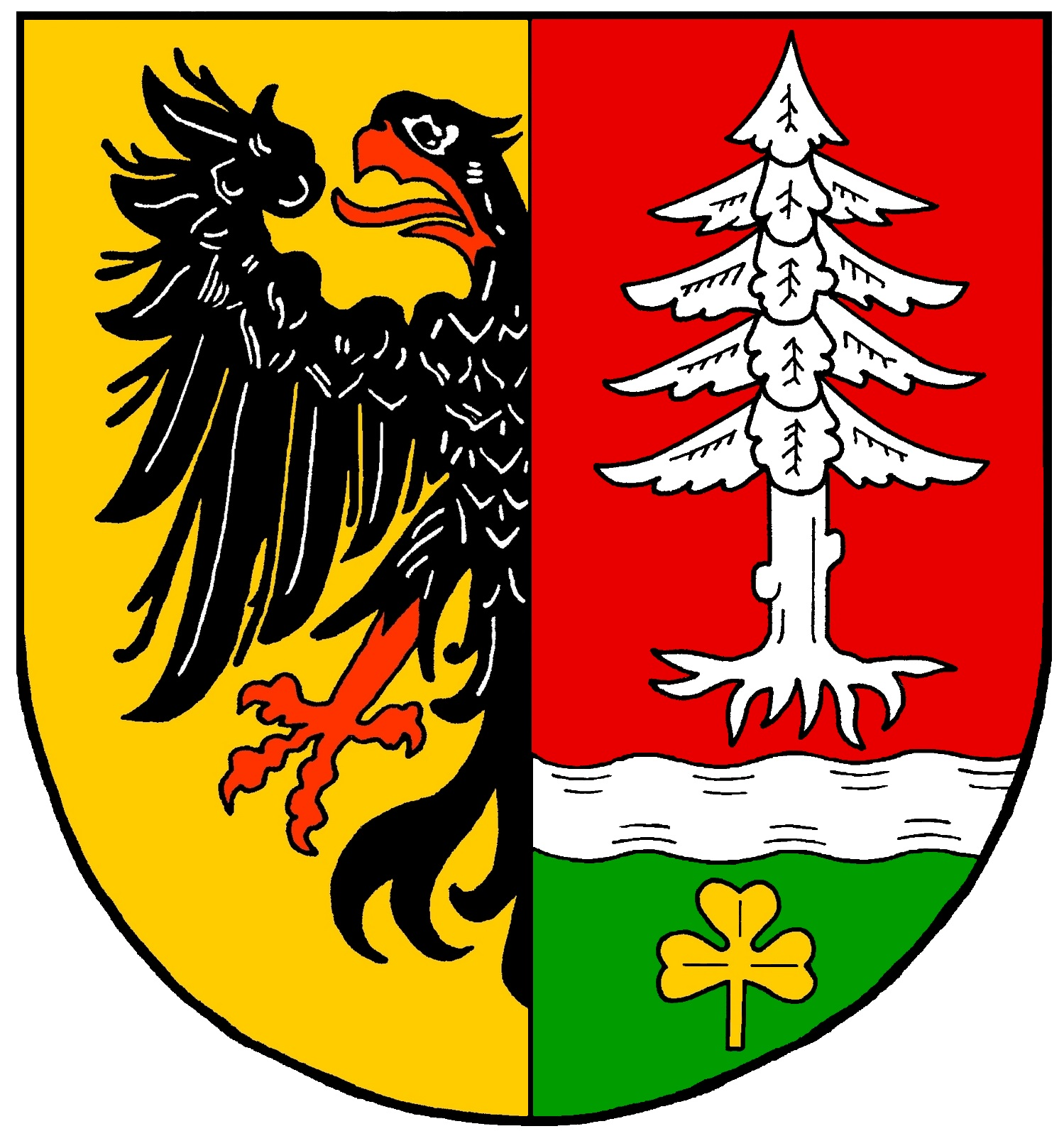
- Coat of arms

- Location of Wurster Nordseeküste within Cuxhaven district
- Interactive map of Wurster Nordseeküste
- Location within Germany Location within Lower Saxony
- Coordinates: 53°47′N 8°36′E
- Country: Germany
- State: Lower Saxony
- District: Cuxhaven

Government
  - Mayor (2021–26): Marcus Itjen

Area
  - Total: 181.73 km^{2} (70.17 sq mi)

Population (2025-12-31)
  - Total: 16,755
  - Density: 92.197/km^{2} (238.79/sq mi)
- Time zone: UTC+01:00 (CET)
  - Summer (DST): UTC+02:00 (CEST)
- Postal codes: 27639
- Dialling codes: 04705, 04741, 04742
- Vehicle registration: CUX
- Website: www.wurster-nordseekueste.de

Wurster Nordseeküste (German pronunciation: [ˈvʊʁstɐ ˈnɔʁtzeːˌkʏstə], lit. 'North Sea Coast of Wursten'; Low German: Wuster Noordseeküst) is a municipality in the district of Cuxhaven, in Lower Saxony, Germany. It takes its name from the historic region Land Wursten and the North Sea coast. It was formed on 1 January 2015 by the merger of the former municipalities Nordholz, Cappel, Dorum, Midlum, Misselwarden, Mulsum, Padingbüttel and Wremen.
