= Medem =

River in Germany

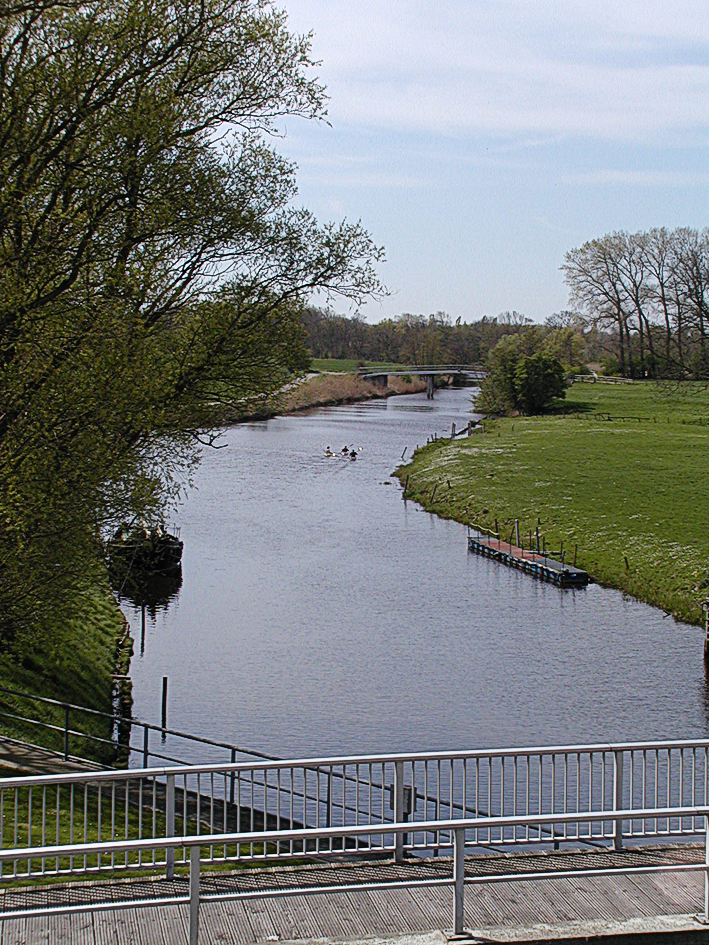

Location
- Country: Germany
- State: Lower Saxony

Physical characteristics
- Mouth
  - location: Elbe near Otterndorf
  - coordinates: 53°49′46″N 8°53′43″E
- Length: 22.8 km (14.2 mi)

Basin features
- Progression: Elbe→ North Sea

The Medem (German pronunciation: [ˈmeːdɛm]) is a river of Lower Saxony, Germany. It is a left tributary of the Elbe, into which it flows near Otterndorf.

== See also ==
- List of rivers of Lower Saxony
