= Plaggen soil =

Type of soil

Plaggen soil or plaggic anthrosol is a type of soil created in parts of northwest Europe in the Middle Ages, as a result of so-called "plaggen" agriculture on marginal podzol soils.

In order to fertilize the fields, pieces of heath or grass including roots and humus ("plaggen") were cut and used as bedding for cattle or sheep. In springtime, this bedding, enriched with slurry was then spread over the fields near the village as manure. The long term practice of this form of agriculture created a rich agricultural soil to a depth of between 40 cm and over 1.50 m, unlike modern arable soils, which tend to be just 30 centimetres deep. The raised fields give rise to a typical landscape with sharp breaks in elevation and are called Plaggenesche in Germany or Es in Dutch. This form of agriculture stopped around 1900 with the introduction of fertilizers.

In Orkney these soils were created already in the 12th to 13th centuries, and on some islands in Shetland these methods continued to be used until the 1960s.

The Maori of New Zealand's agriculture included plaggen soil forming practices that increased drainage for kumara crops.
