= Dorum =

- Ortsteil of Wurster Nordseeküste
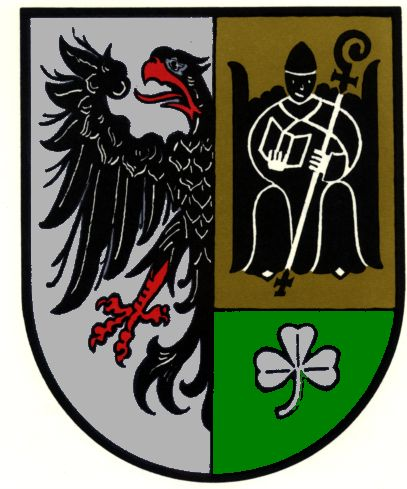
- Coat of arms

- Dorum in Wurster Nordseeküste
- Interactive map of Dorum
- Location within Germany Location within Lower Saxony
- Coordinates: 53°40′28″N 08°30′57″E
- Country: Germany
- State: Lower Saxony
- District: Cuxhaven
- Municipality: Wurster Nordseeküste
- Subdivisions: Dorum-Ort, Dorum-Neufeld

Area
  - Total: 24.32 km^{2} (9.39 sq mi)
- Elevation: 2 m (6.6 ft)

Population (2013-12-31)
  - Total: 3,767
  - Density: 154.9/km^{2} (401.2/sq mi)
- Time zone: UTC+01:00 (CET)
  - Summer (DST): UTC+02:00 (CEST)
- Postal codes: 27639
- Dialling codes: 04742, 04741
- Website: www.dorum.de

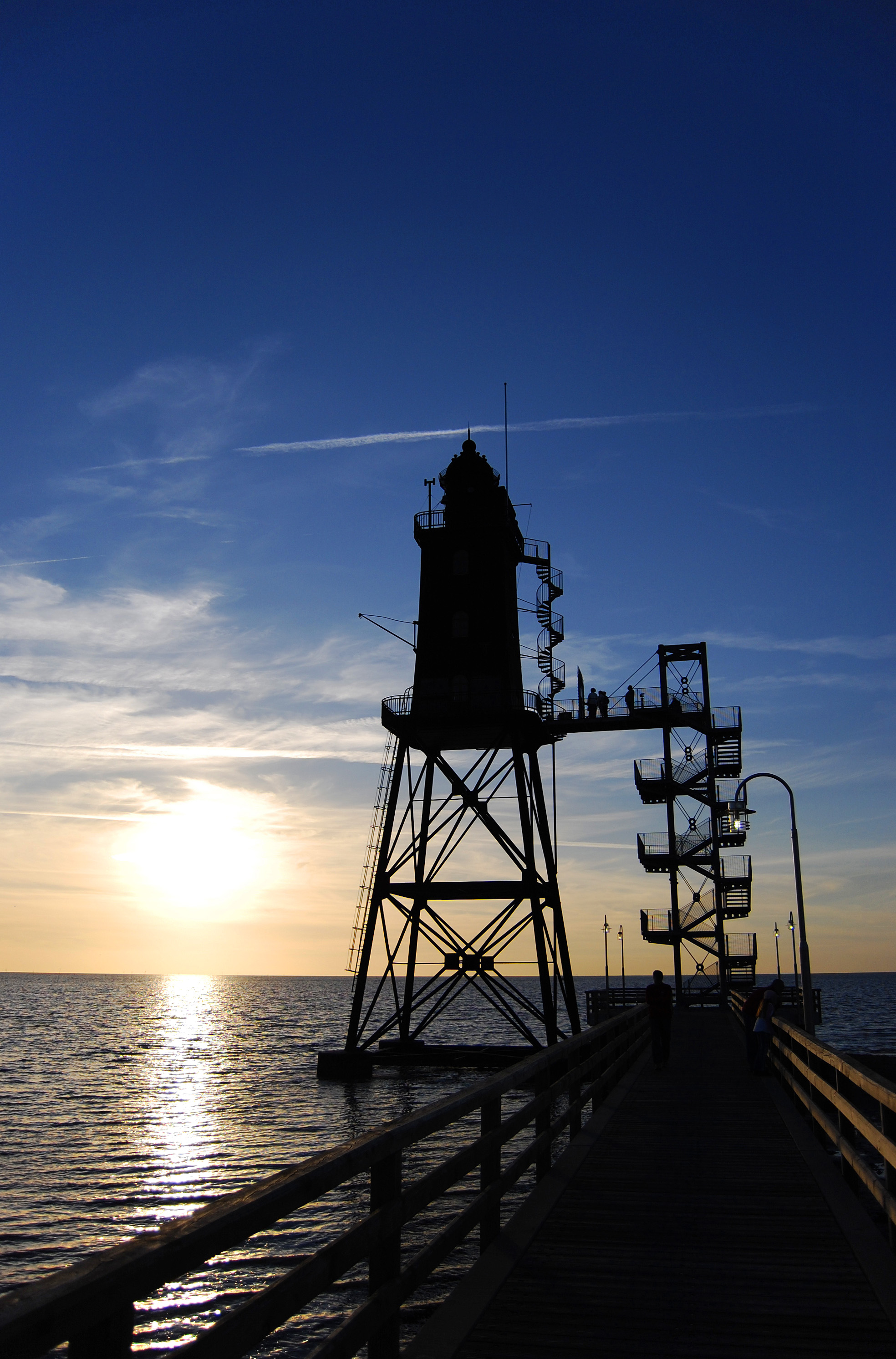
Sunset in Dorum with pharos "Obereversand"

Dorum (German pronunciation: [ˈdoːʁʊm]) is a village and a former municipality in the district of Cuxhaven, in Lower Saxony, Germany. Since 1 January 2015 it has been part of the municipality Wurster Nordseeküste.

The Land of Wursten, a somewhat autonomous farmers' republic including Dorum, had long been claimed by the Prince-Archbishopric of Bremen, and in 1524 it was formally subjected. In 1648 the Prince-Archbishopric was transformed into the Duchy of Bremen, which was first ruled in personal union by the Swedish and from 1715 on by the Hanoverian Crown. In 1823 the Duchy was abolished and its territory became part of the Stade Region.

== People from Dorum ==
- 1888: Karl Olfers, politician
- 1944: Wolfgang von Geldern, politician
- 1959: Volker Müller, microbiologist and biochemist
