= Wremen =

- Ortsteil of Wurster Nordseeküste
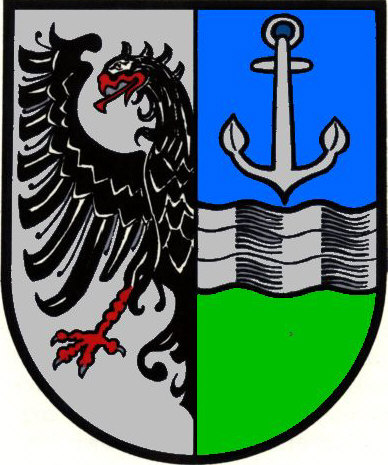
- Coat of arms
- Interactive map of Wremen
- Location within Germany Location within Lower Saxony
- Coordinates: 53°38′57″N 08°30′30″E
- Country: Germany
- State: Lower Saxony
- District: Cuxhaven
- Municipality: Wurster Nordseeküste
- Subdivisions: 5 Ortschaften

Area
  - Total: 25.16 km^{2} (9.71 sq mi)
- Elevation: 2 m (6.6 ft)
- Time zone: UTC+01:00 (CET)
  - Summer (DST): UTC+02:00 (CEST)
- Postal codes: 27639
- Dialling codes: 04705
- Vehicle registration: CUX
- Website: http://www.wremen.eu/

Wremen (German pronunciation: [ˈvʁeːmən]; Low German: Wreem) is a village and a former municipality in the district of Cuxhaven, in Lower Saxony, Germany. Since 1 January 2015 it is part of the municipality Wurster Nordseeküste.

The Land of Wursten, a rather autonomous farmers' republic including Wremen, had long been claimed by the Prince-Archbishopric of Bremen, until in 1524 it could be definitely be subjected. In 1648 the Prince-Archbishopric was transformed into the Duchy of Bremen, which was first ruled in personal union by the Swedish and from 1715 on by the Hanoverian Crown. In 1823 the Duchy was abolished and its territory became part of the Stade Region.

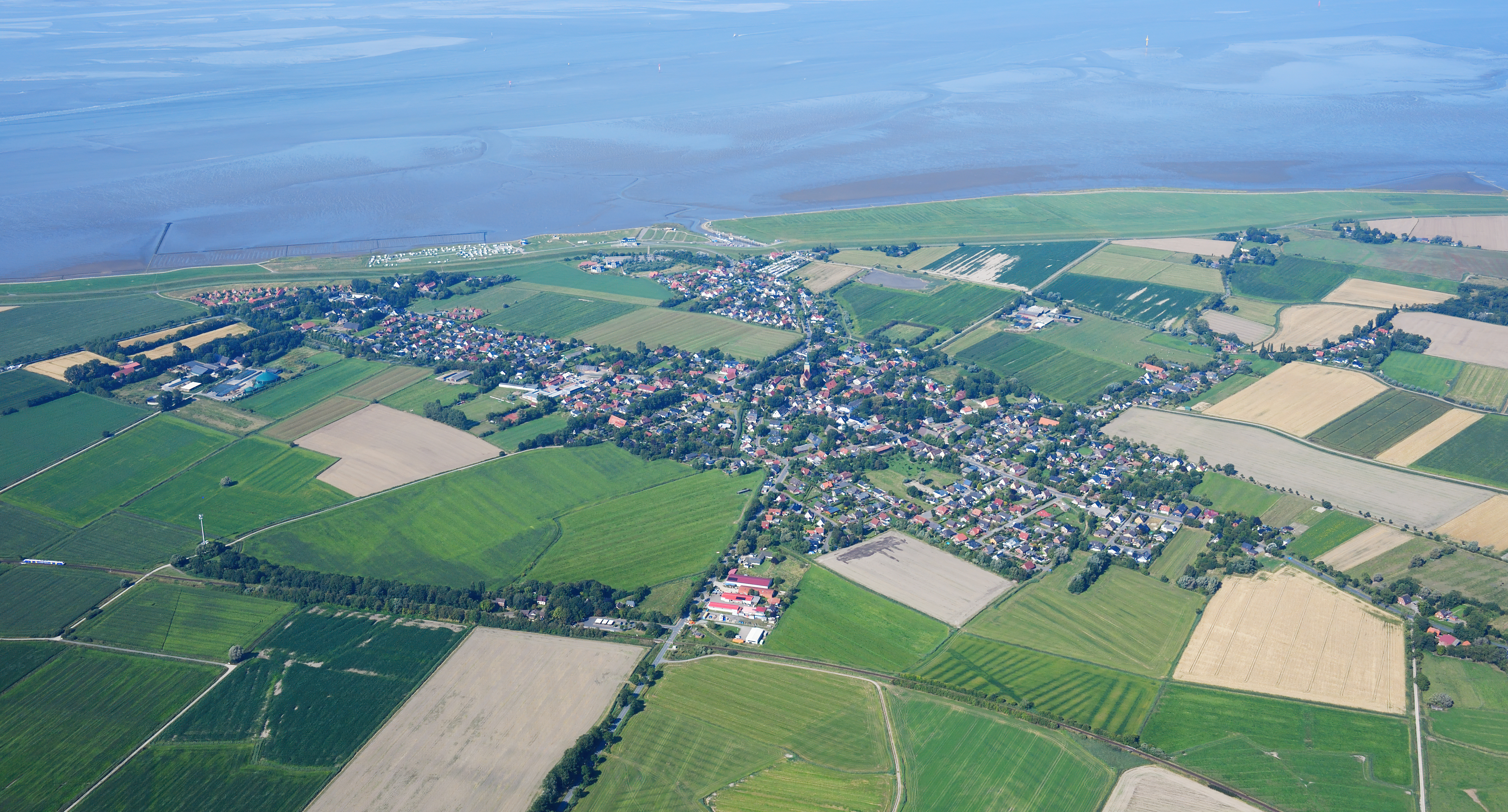
Aerial view of Wremen from the east

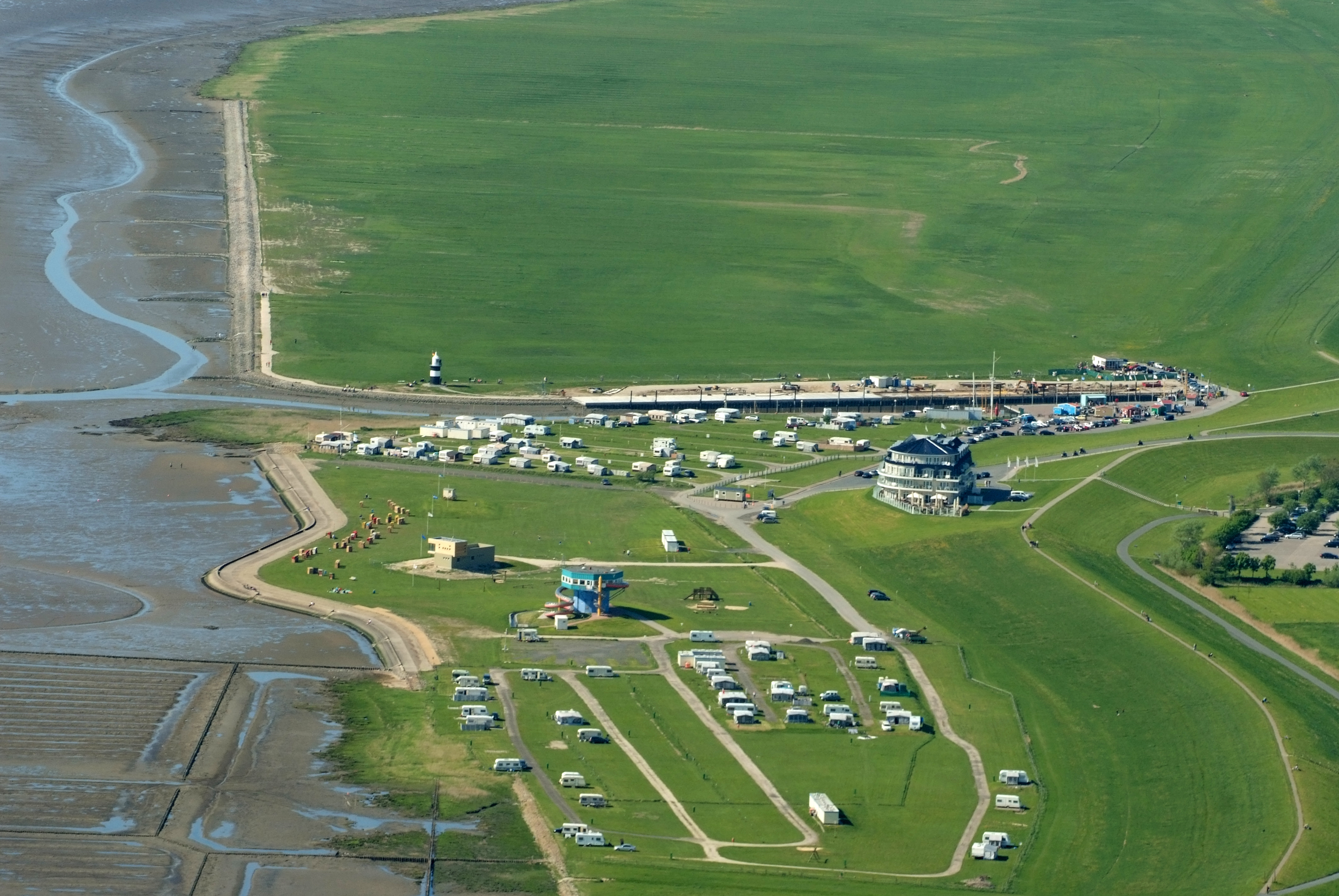
Wremen beach, harbour and lighthouse
