= Schönebecker Aue =

River in Germany

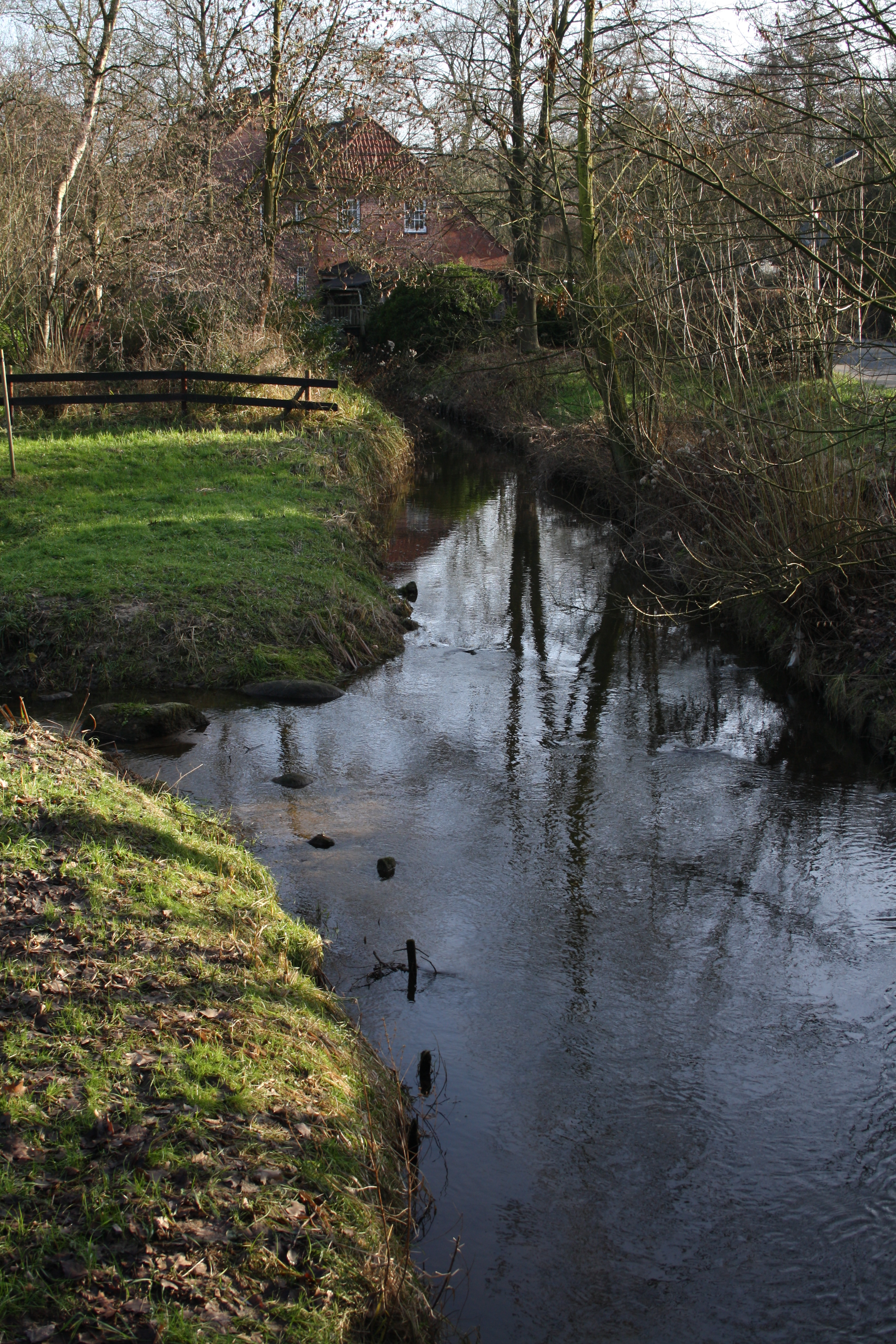
- The Aue downstream from the weir at Schloss Schönebeck. In the background the old water mill

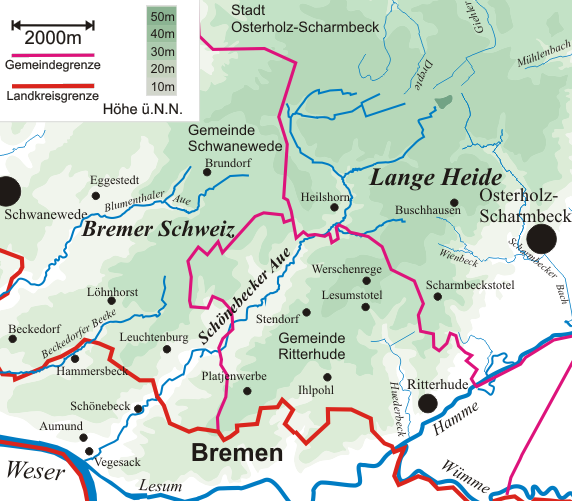
- Course of the Schönebecker Aue north of Bremen

Location
- Country: Germany
- States: Lower Saxony and Bremen

Physical characteristics
- Source
  - location: Lange Heide, Osterholz
  - elevation: approx 40 m (130 ft) above NAP
- Mouth
  - location: River Weser in Bremen-Vegesack
  - coordinates: 53°10′08″N 8°37′37″E
  - elevation: 0 m (0 ft) NAP
- Length: 17.7 km (11.0 mi)

Basin features
- Progression: Weser→ North Sea

Schönebecker Aue is a geest stream in Bremen and Lower Saxony, Germany.

The Schönebecker Aue's source is on the Lange Heide plateau near Heilshorn (in Osterholz-Scharmbeck, district Osterholz) in Lower Saxony. Its mouth is in Bremen-Vegesack in the river Weser.

== Course ==
The Schönebecker Aue's total length is 17.7 km (11.0 mi), of which the last 3.1 km (1.9 mi) are in the city of Bremen. The stream's source is on the Lange Heide, a geest plateau north of Bremen in Osterholz-Scharmbeck, which is also the source of several other geest streams (e.g.: the Drepte, Giehler Bach, Scharmbecker Bach and Wienbeck).

From a height of approx 40m above NAP, the Aue flows through the so-called Bremen Switzerland in the lowland meadows around the castle Schloss Schönebeck. Here the stream carved the Auetal (Aue valley), which is a major recreational area for the population of Bremen-Nord. Not far after the Aue reaches Bremen territory, it flows into a pond, which on one side forms a crescent around Schloss Schönebeck, and on the other side used to serve as the water source for a now-disused water mill. At the old mill today, there is only a weir, which regulates the water level in the Schlossteich (castle pond).

Downstream from the weir, the Aue flows through Bremen suburbs Schönebeck (belongs to Bremen-Vegesack) und Bremen-Vegesack, then for a short way through fields, before reaching another residential area. Bundesautobahn 270 and Uhthoffstraße pass over the Aue, and at Vegesack railway station the stream is led underneath the station's square via a series of pipes. Directly from the pipes, the Aue flows into Vegesack harbor.

== Redirection ==
In its upper reaches, the course of the Aue has been "lightly to moderately altered". The weir at Schloss Schönebeck, as well as pipe laying at Vegesack railway station had previously caused impassable obstacles for migrating fish.

In 2007 a redirection of the Aue around the weir was initiated. This involved a small, naturalistically formed canal, which leads the stream in a crescent around the weir and was laid out by conservationist volunteers.

The mouth of the Aue was modified several years ago with a stone embankment, through which the migrating fish can still pass. For years before that, the "opening" of the Aue into a harbor basin near to Vegesack railway station was a controversial discussion point in Bremen communal politics.

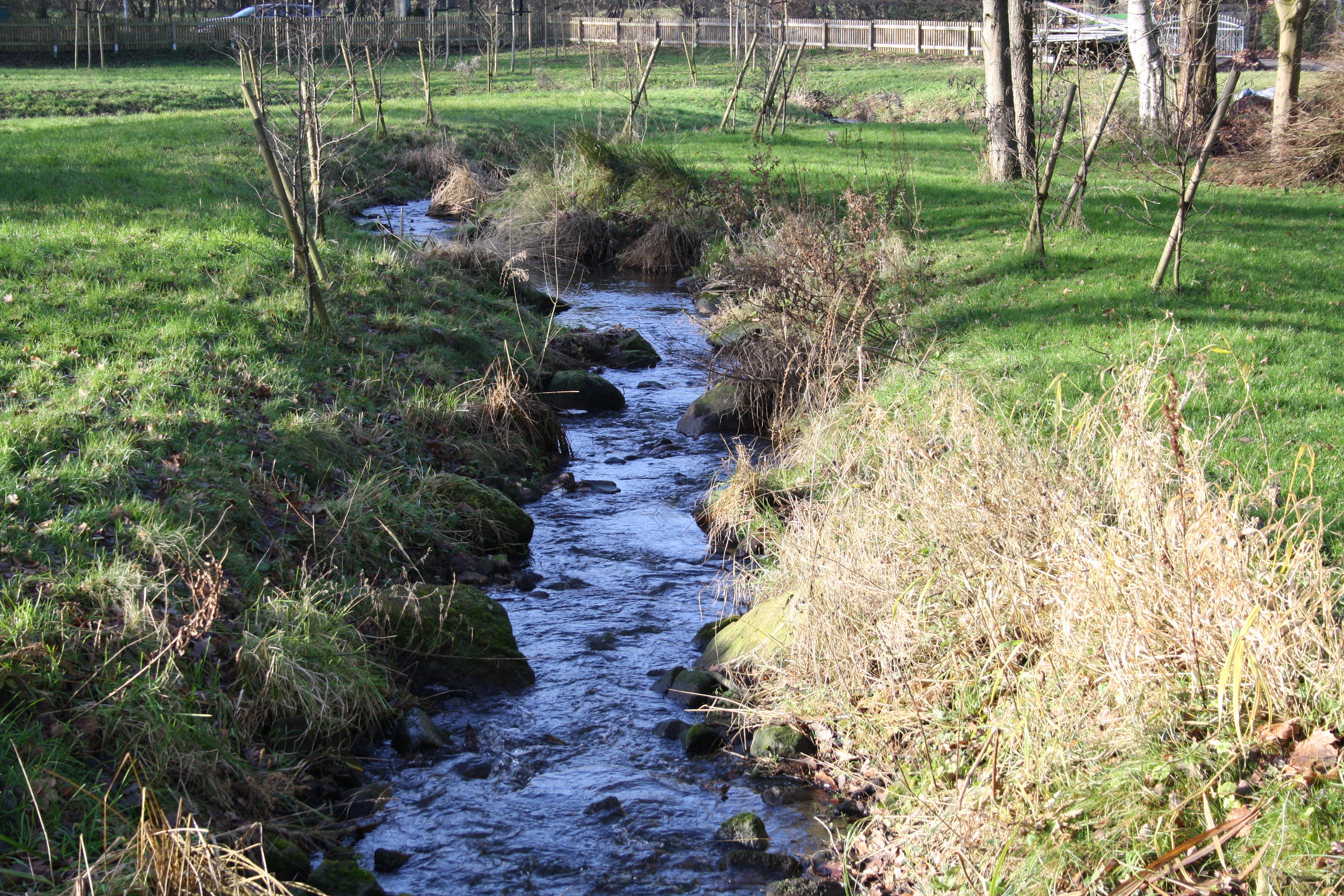
View of the re-routed river at its upper end

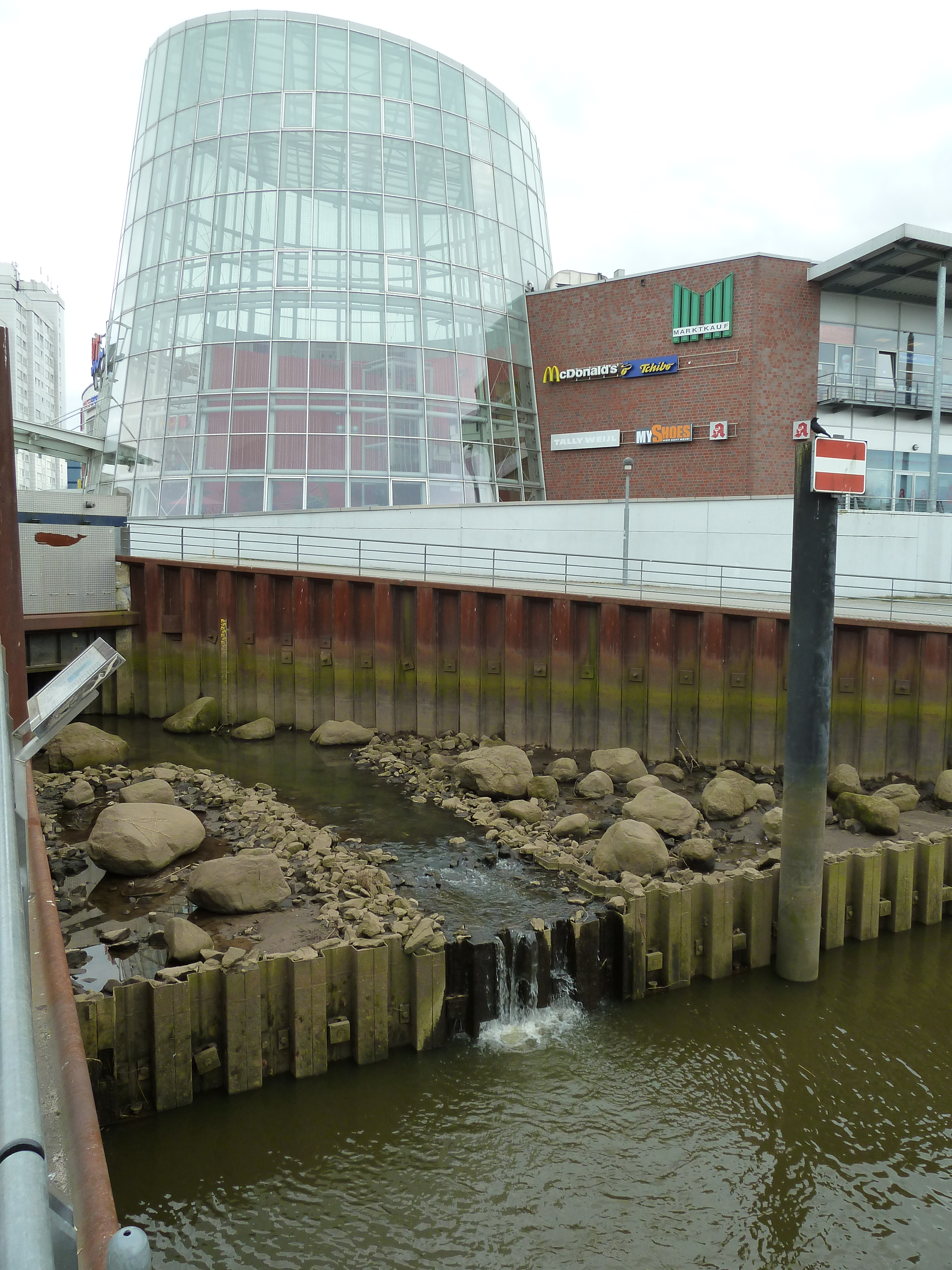
Mouth of the Schönebecker Aue at the Port of Vegesack

== See also ==
- List of rivers of Bremen
- List of rivers of Lower Saxony
