= Osterholz Geest =

Coordinates: 53°15′N 8°45′E

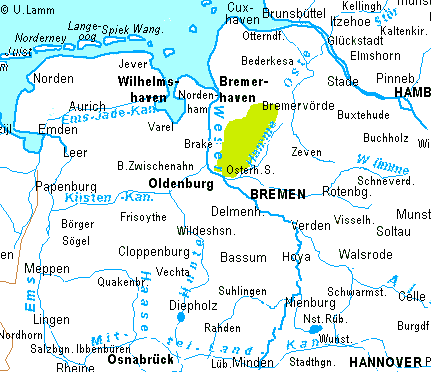
Location of the Osterholz Geest

Relief map of the Osterholz Geest

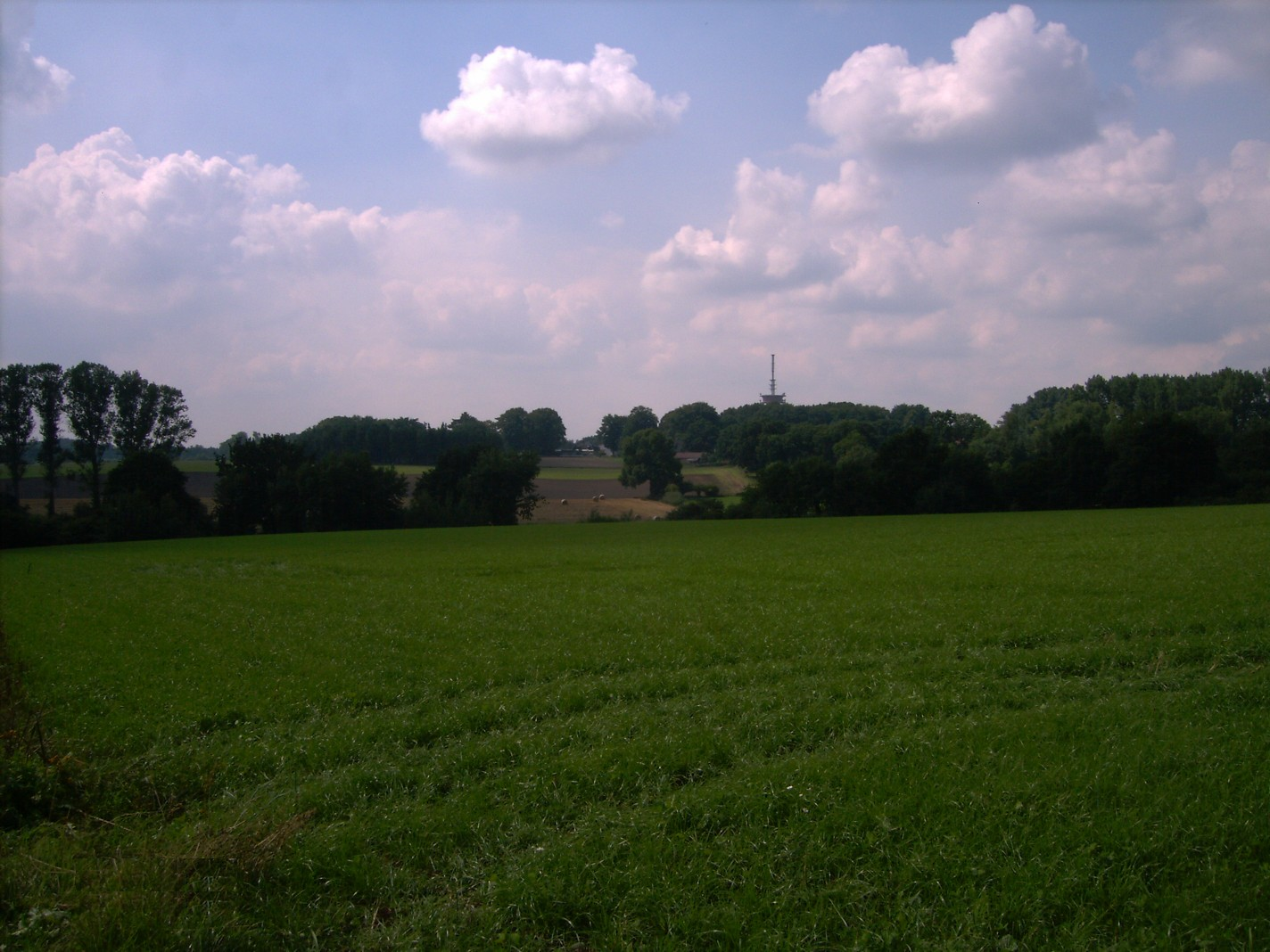
The Osterholz Geest near Wallhöfen

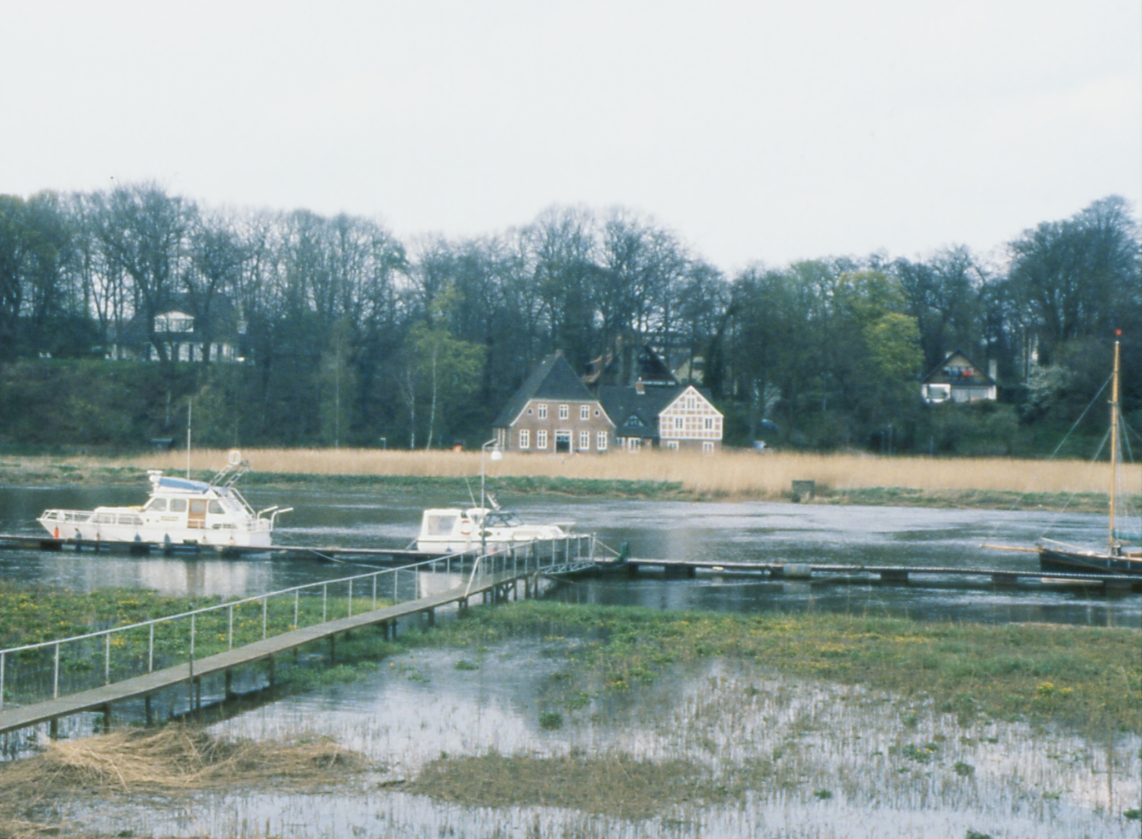
High bank of the River Lesum

The Osterholz Geest (Northern Low Saxon: Oosterholter Geest) is an undulating, sandy area of ground moraine between the city of Bremen and the towns of Bremerhaven and Bremervörde.

== Geography ==
The Osterholz Geest forms the southern part of the Wesermünde Geest. To the west it borders on the marsh known as Osterstade on the east bank of the Lower Weser and to the east on the Hamme depression with its great bog, the Teufelsmoor ("Devil’s Bog"). To the north it transitions into the depressions, interspersed with geest ridges, between the coastal marshes of Land Wursten and the River Oste, which form the northern part of the Wesermünde Geest. To the south it extends as far as the high river banks on the Weser and Lesum. This sharply defined edge of geest runs northeast through the parish of Ritterhude and the county town of Osterholz-Scharmbeck as far as the region of Bremervörde. There the Osterholz Geest borders on the Zeven Geest near Karlshöfen. The Joch, which forms both ridges of geest at this point, dates back to a Saale glaciation water outlet (Gletschertor) and is the northern end of the Hamme glacial valley, in whose depression the Teufelsmoor ("Devil’s Bog") was formed.

The northern and western edge of the geest are, by contrast, flat and transition in the northwest into the Beverstedt Moorgeest region around Bremerhaven. The highest point above sea level is the Langen Heide (48 metres (157 ft)) between Osterholz-Scharmbeck and Garlstedt.

== Administration ==
The largest part of this landscape belongs to the district of Osterholz, the north to Cuxhaven and Rotenburg districts, the southwest to Bremen-Nord. The border area between Bremen-Nord and the district of Osterholz is also known as Bremen Switzerland.

== Settlement and vegetation ==
In the south of the Osterholz Geest there is a band of settlement from Schwanewede to Bremen-Nord, Ritterhude and Osterholz-Scharmbeck. The rest of the area is sparsely populated. About half the land consists of arable farmland, almost a third is covered in forest, predominantly coniferous. Part of the forested area near Garlstedt and Schwanewede is not accessible to the public for military reasons.

== Cultural monuments ==
In summer 1982 a comprehensive survey into monument conservation was carried out by a working group in the town and county of Osterholz-Scharmbeck. It was known that (in comparison with the 19th century) a large number of archaeological sites must have already been destroyed especially by settlement in the area. A review was carried out of the information collected by former district local historian, H. Fitschen, the archaeological land records by H. J. Killmann (formerly of the department of heritage sites) and observations carried out over many years by K. P. Schultz (Head of the Osterholz district local history museum), in order to gain clarity about the actual sites and their condition. As a result, in 1982 the following above-ground, visible monuments were identified on the town and county terrain:

- 9 megalithic graves
  - Osterholz-Scharmbeck megalithic tomb
  - Megaliths (Hünensteine) near Axstedt
  - Stone chamber near Meyenburg
- 361 tumuli (e. g. in der Neegenbargsheide north of Schwanewede and near Oldenbüttel)
- 8 fortifications
- 249 wurts
- 4 Schalensteine
- 12 other objects
  - Seemoor environmental and prehistoric trail near Lübberstedt

All nine megalithic graves are located on the Osterholz Geest. Because of the numerous finds of characteristic ceramic artefacts in these sites this prehistoric period is referred to as the funnelbeaker culture.

== Sources ==
- LGN = Landesvermessung und Geobasisinformation Niedersachsen, Regionalkarten 1:100 000, Blätter 3 (Elbe-Weser-Dreieck) und 4 (Großraum Bremen)
