= Wesermünde Geest =

Series of ridges in Germany

Coordinates: 53°27′N 9°0′E

The Wesermünde Geest (German: Wesermünder Geest; Northern Low Saxon: Wersermünner Geest) is the collective name for several geest ridges in the west of Cuxhaven district and Bremen's North Borough in northern Germany. The ridges are separated from one another by wetlands. These terminal moraines were formed during the Saale glaciation, are up to between 10 and 70 m (33 and 230 ft) above sea level (NN), and are covered by scattered woods and farmland. The wetland areas, between 0 and 5 m (0 and 16 ft) above sea level, are predominantly used for grazing.

== Location ==
The Wesermünde is bounded to the south by the River Lesum in the northern part of Bremen, to the west by the marshes of Osterstade (on the Lower Weser south of Bremerhaven) and Land Wursten (on the Outer Weser north of Bremerhaven). To the north, the Wesermünde Geest is bordered by the Land Hadeln, part of the Elbe marshes, and the Elbe estuary near Cuxhaven. Its eastern boundary is formed by the rivers Oste, as far as the town of Bremervörde, and Hamme with the great bog of the Teufelsmoor near Osterholz-Scharmbeck. East of these rivers is the Zeven Geest that, like the Wesermünde Geest, is part of the natural region of the Stade Geest.

About 10 km (6.2 mi) south of the city boundary of Bremerhaven the Weser tributary, the Lune and its valley, cuts through the Wesermünde Geest. The part lying south of the Lune is called the Osterholz Geest and lies mostly in the district of Osterholz. The higher areas of this part of the geest, which are over 40 m (130 ft) above sea level (Normalnull) in places, form the region of Bremen Switzerland, the Lange Heide heath and the Eulenberg between Brillit and Basdahl. Numerous geest perimeter streams rise here, including the Giehler Bach which forms the headstream of the Hamme, and the Drepte.

The northern part of the Wesermünde Geest lies for the most part within the district of Cuxhaven. In the west part near Lamstedt the land rises to over 60 m (200 ft) in the Westerberg area, and in the Wingst near Cadenberge even up to 74 m (243 ft) above sea level. The part of the Wesermünde Geest north of the River Geeste is characterised by numerous shallow valleys and bogs and only reaches heights of over 250 m (820 ft) in the area south of Bederkesa and in the Wurster Heide. The northwestern part of the geest from Bremerhaven-Lehe to Cuxhaven-Altenwalde forms the Hohe Lieth and Wurster Heide.

== Landscape and vegetation ==
In addition to intensive grazing, the geest is also used for arable farming. In addition, its numerous pine woods are used for forestry. The raised bogs in the northern part of the geest have had their peat deposits almost completely removed. On the higher elevations, there are also near-natural deciduous forests and many areas of heathland. The countless rivers and streams that cut through the ridges of the geest, form shallow valleys in which blanket bogs are found. The state of Bremen has established a nature reserve (the Hammersbecker Wiesen) in such a depression to preserve the Beckedorfer Beeke.

== Name ==
The name Wesermünde Geest goes back to the former independent Prussian town of Wesermünde, that between 1924 and 1947 made up the largest part of the present city of Bremerhaven. It was the headquarters of the eponymous Landkreis, in whose territory the largest part of the Wesermünde Geest lay. On 1 August 1977 the district of Wesermünde was disbanded and replaced by the newly created district of Cuxhaven. The name Wesermünde Geest, occasionally used in the 1920s and 1930s, is very uncommon.
