= Lübberstedt =

- Municipality
- Coat of arms

- Location of Lübberstedt within Osterholz district
- Interactive map of Lübberstedt
- Location within Germany Location within Lower Saxony
- Coordinates: 53°19′N 08°48′E
- Country: Germany
- State: Lower Saxony
- District: Osterholz
- Municipal assoc.: Hambergen

Government
  - Mayor: Dieter Langmaack (CDU)

Area
  - Total: 12.37 km^{2} (4.78 sq mi)
- Elevation: 14 m (46 ft)

Population (2025-12-31)
  - Total: 689
  - Density: 55.7/km^{2} (144/sq mi)
- Time zone: UTC+01:00 (CET)
  - Summer (DST): UTC+02:00 (CEST)
- Postal codes: 27729
- Dialling codes: 04793
- Vehicle registration: OHZ

Lübberstedt (German pronunciation: [ˈlʏbɐʃtɛt]; Low German: Lübbs) is a municipality and village located in the district of Osterholz in the German state of Lower Saxony. It is located north of Osterholz-Scharmbeck. Together with the villages of Hambergen, Axstedt, Holste and Vollersode, it forms the Samtgemeinde of Hambergen.

== History ==
During the last year of the war (1944) a Neuengamme sub-camp was erected near the village for Jewish women from Auschwitz-Birkenau. Several female guards (Aufseherinnen) staffed the camp and maltreated the prisoners who were starved, overworked and brutalized.

== Transport ==
Lübberstedt has a railway station on the Bremerhaven to Bremen line that opened in 1862. The main road is the B 74 connecting Bremen and Stade.
