= Bundesautobahn 27 =

German autobahn road

A 27
- Bundesautobahn 27

Route information
- Part of E234
- Length: 158 km (98 mi)

Major junctions
- From: Walsrode
- To: Cuxhaven

Location
- Country: Germany
- States: Lower Saxony, Bremen

Highway system
- Roads in Germany; Autobahns; List; Federal; List; State; E-roads
← A 26	→ A 28

Bundesautobahn 27 (translates from German as Federal Motorway 27, short form Autobahn 27, abbreviated as BAB 27 or A 27) branches off the A 7 at Autobahndreieck Walsrode to the northwest, crossing A 1 at the Bremer Kreuz and continuing eastwards of Bremen, toward Cuxhaven. It also serves as European route E234, a B Class road on the International E-road network.

Due to the large ports (especially in Bremerhaven) alongside the Autobahn, there is heavy truck traffic.

Its northernmost part, between Bremen and Cuxhaven, largely replaced the Bundesstraße 6, although some maps still show the B 6 within the city limits of Bremerhaven.

== Exit list ==
Legend:

- I/C - Interchange, I/S - Intersection, RSA - Rest and service area, OBR - Overhead bridge restaurant, R/R - Restaurant and rest plaza, L/B - Layby, V/P - Vista point, TN - tunnel, T/P - Toll plaza, BR - Bridge
- C - Cloverleaf, S - Stack, T-A - Trumpet-A, T-B - Trumpet-B, DT - Directional-T/Y, SDT - Semi-Directional-T/Y, P-Y - Partial-Y, D - Diamond, P-C - Partial cloverleaf, D-D - Diverging diamond, D-R - Direct ramp

1	Cuxhaven B 73
2	Altenwalde B 73
3	Nordholz
RSA	parking area
4	Neuenwalde
5	Debstedt
RSA	Rest area
6	Bremerhaven-Überseehäfen B 6
7	Bremerhaven-Zentrum B 212
8	Bremerhaven-Geestemünde
9	Bremerhaven-Wulsdorf B 71
I/C	3-way interchange Bremerhaven-Süd (planned) A 20
RSA	Rest area
10	Bremerhaven-Süd/Nesse B 6
BR	Lune
I/C	3-way interchange Stotel (planned) A 20
11	Stotel B 437
12	Hagen
RSA	parking area
RSA	parking area
13	Uthlede
14	Schwanewede
RSA	Habichthorst parking area
15	Ihlpohl
16	Bremen-Burglesum 4-way interchange A 270 B 74
17	Bremen-Industriehäfen 3-way interchange A 281
18	Bremen-Überseestadt B 6
19	Bremen-Horn/Lehe
RSA	parking area
20	Bremen-Vahr
21	Bremen-Sebaldsbrück B 75
22	Bremer Kreuz A 1
23	Achim-Nord
24	Achim-Ost
24a	Achim-Süd
RSA	Services Goldbach
25	Verden-Nord B 215
26	Verden-Ost
27	Walsrode-West B 209
28	Walsrode-Süd
29	Dreieck Walsrode 3-way interchange A 7
