= Bundesautobahn 270 =

Federal motorway in Germany

A 270
- Bundesautobahn 270

Route information
- Length: 10.5 km (6.5 mi)

Major junctions
- West end: Farge (Bremen)
- East end: Ritterhude (Osterholz, Lower Saxony)

Location
- Country: Germany
- States: Bremen, Lower Saxony

Highway system
- Roads in Germany; Autobahns; List; Federal; List; State; E-roads

Bundesautobahn 270 (translates from German as Federal Motorway 270, short form Autobahn 270, abbreviated as BAB 270 or A 270) is an autobahn in Germany.

The A 270 was created in 2001 as a redesignation of the freeway into the northern part of Bremen. Previously, the freeway was known as the B 74n Lesumerschnellweg. The freeway replaced the route of the B 74 through the populated areas of northern Bremen.

Recent plans called for an extension of the A 270 around the northern and eastern boundaries of Farge, to end across the street from the terminal of the Farge - Berne ferry. This project was opened to traffic on 9 December 2009. However, it was a built as an at-grade expressway instead, thus requiring the return of the B 74n designation.

Because it cuts through a densely developed area, the A 270 is below normal autobahn standards for most of its route. The speed limit for the entire route is 80 km/h (50 mph), and in many places there is no hard shoulder. The A 270 ends just before the A 27/E 234, a short distance after crossing into Lower Saxony. The connection with the A 27 is made at an at-grade intersection.

As is expected for urban freeways, some of the junctions are only accessible from one direction; one junction (3b, Lobbendorf) does not permit autobahn traffic to exit at all.

== Exit list ==
B 74		Road continues as the B 74 n towards Berne
Intersection	(1)	Rönnebeck B 74
	(2)	Bremen-Lüssum
		Hochstraße 580 m
		Bahnbrücke 50 m
	(3a)	Bremen-Blumenthal
	(3b)	Lobbendorf No exit; entrance to eastbound only
	(4)	Bremen-Vegesack-Mitte
		Bahnbrücke 50 m
		Straßenbrücke 70 m
	(5)	Bremen-Vegesack-Hafen
	(6)	Bremen-St. Magnus entrance to eastbound only
	(7)	Bremen-Lesum
	(8)	Bremen-Ihletal Exit from eastbound only; entrance to westbound only
Intersection	(9)	Bremen-Burglesum A 27 E234 B 74
B 74		Road continues as the B 74 towards Osterholz-Scharmbeck
