= Wienbeck =

River in Germany

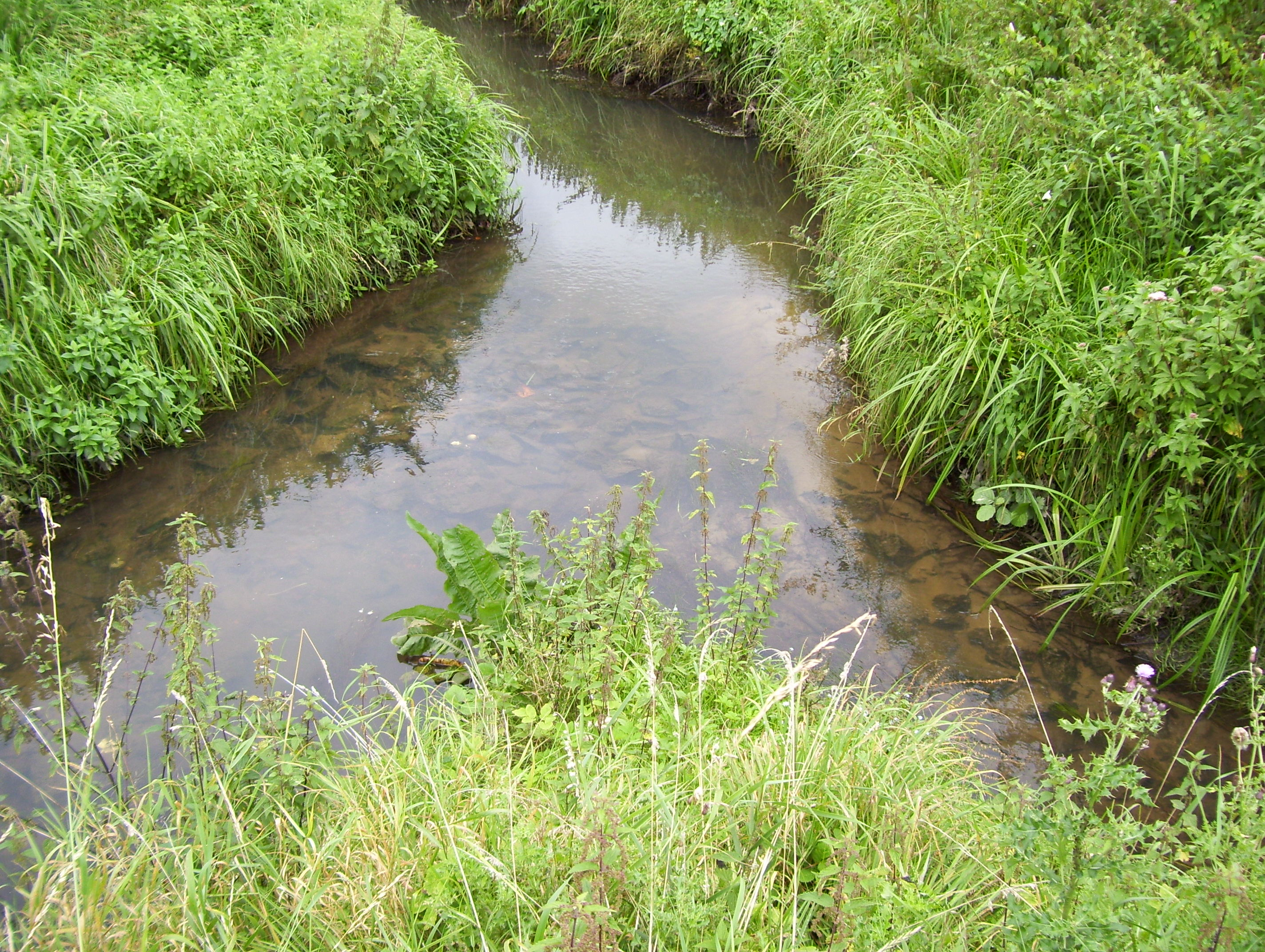
- Confluence of Scharmbecker Bach and Wienbeck

Location
- Country: Germany
- State: Lower Saxony
- Location: Osterholz-Scharmbeck

Physical characteristics
- Mouth: Scharmbecker Bach
  - coordinates: 53.2137°N 8.7884°E

Basin features
- Progression: Scharmbecker Bach→ Hamme→ Lesum→ Weser→ North Sea

Wienbeck is a small river in Osterholz-Scharmbeck, Lower Saxony, Germany. It flows into the Scharmbecker Bach.

== See also ==
- List of rivers of Lower Saxony
