= Oldenbüttel station =

Railway station in Hambergen, Germany

Oldenbüttel

General information
- Location: Am Bahnhof 1 Hambergen, Lower Saxony; Germany
- Coordinates: 53°17′00″N 8°48′38″E
- Owner: DB Netz
- Operator: DB Station&Service
- Lines: Bremen–Bremerhaven line (KBS 125)
- Distance: 150.3 km (93.4 mi) from Hannover Hbf
- Platforms: 2 side platforms
- Tracks: 2
- Train operators: NordWestBahn

Other information
- Station code: 4766
- DS100 code: HOLB
- IBNR: 8004668
- Category: 6
- Fare zone: 220 (VBN)

Services
Preceding station	Bremen S-Bahn	Following station
Lübberstedt towards Bremerhaven-Lehe	RS2	Osterholz-Scharmbeck towards Twistringen
Location

Oldenbüttel station (German: Bahnhof Oldenbüttel), is a railway station in the municipality of Hambergen, in Lower Saxony, Germany. It is located on the Bremen–Bremerhaven line of Deutsche Bahn.

== Services ==
As of the December 2020 timetable change, the following services stop at Oldenbüttel:

- Bremen S-Bahn RS2: hourly service between Bremerhaven-Lehe and Twistringen via Bremen Hauptbahnhof, with additional service during peak hours.
