= Gerold Otten =

German politician (born 1955)

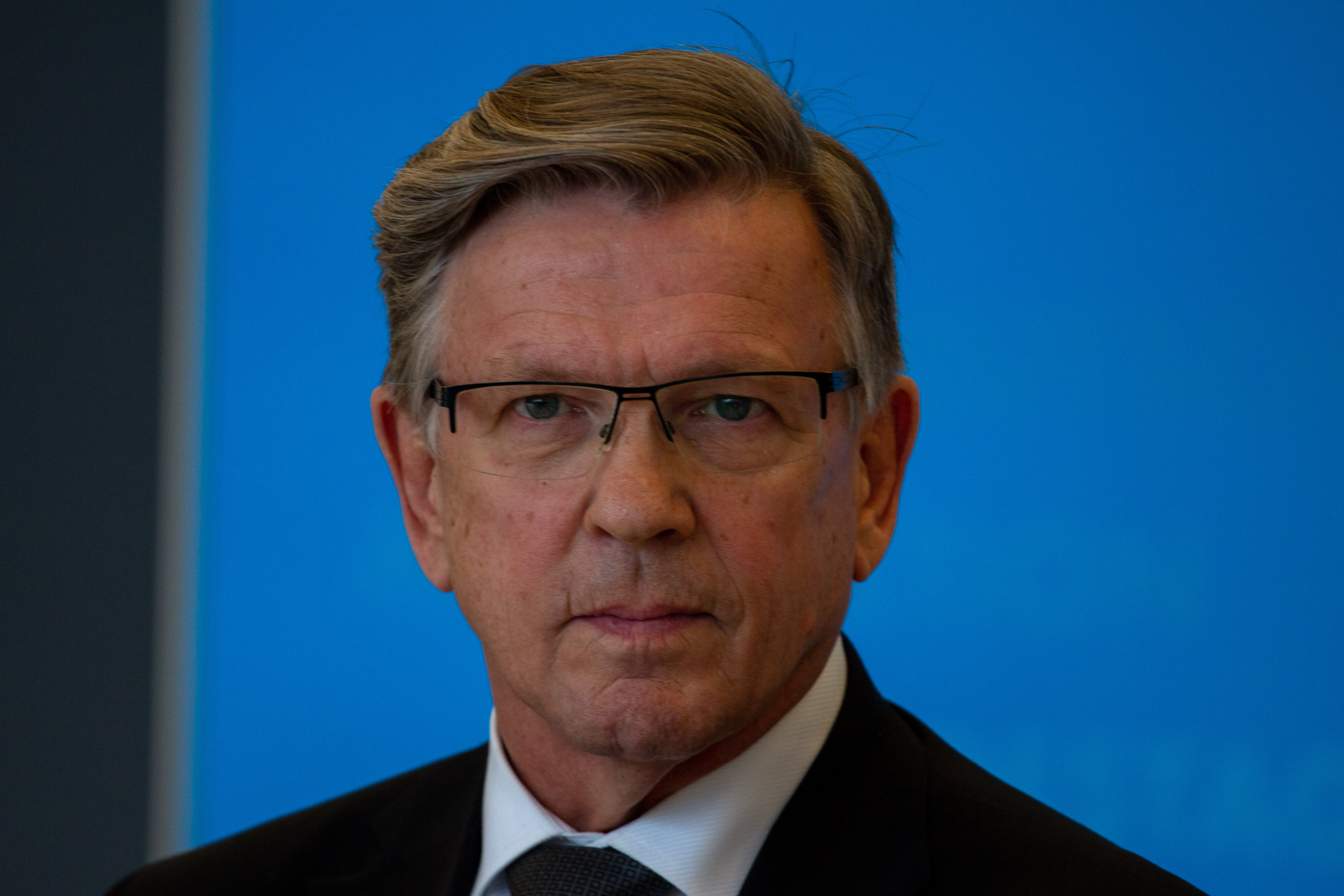
- Otten in 2019

Member of the Bundestag
- Incumbent
- Assumed office 24 October 2017

Personal details
- Born: 7 December 1955 (age 70) Lübberstedt, West Germany
- Party: AfD

Gerold Joachim Otten (born 7 December 1955) is a retired German Air Force Oberst (Colonel) and politician (AfD). Since 24 October 2017, he has served as member of the Bundestag.

On 9 April 2019, in the post 2021 term, and again on 25 March 2025, the AfD faction in the Bundestag nominated Otten for the position of Vice President of the Bundestag. As every AfD candidate since 2017, he was rejected.

== Biography ==
Birn 7 December 1955, Otten grew up in a hamlet near Bremen, his father was a social democratic mayor of Lübberstedt for 25 years.

In July 1975, he joined the Bundeswehr Luftwaffe and was trained as a Weapon systems officer (WSO) for the F-4 Phantom and Panavia Tornado aircraft. The last three years of his "BO 41" career ("professional officer with the special age limit of 41 years") were spent at the multinational Tri-National Tornado Training Establishment, based at RAF Cottesmore in England for German, British and Italian Tornado crews. He left the Bundeswehr in March 1997 with the rank of major.

Subsequently, Otten worked for the aerospace group DASA and was most recently active as a Eurofighter Sales Director in its successor company Airbus Defense and Space. He was a colonel of the reserve at the Air Force Officer School in Fürstenfeldbruck.

Otten lives in Putzbrunn, is divorced and has an adult son.
