= Bundesautobahn 281 =

Federal motorway in Germany

Coordinates: 53.081765°N 8.724435°E

A 281
- Bundesautobahn 281

Route information
- Length: 4 km (2.5 mi)
- Existed: 1995–present

Location
- Country: Germany
- States: Bremen

Highway system
- Roads in Germany; Autobahns; List; Federal; List; State; E-roads

Bundesautobahn 281 (translates from German as Federal Motorway 281, short form Autobahn 281, abbreviated as BAB 281 or A 281) is an autobahn in Bremen in northwestern Germany. The first part was opened in 1995, parts near the Bremen Airport are currently under construction. A second Weser tunnel will be part of the project, presumably being financed as a toll road and built by a private contractor.

== Exit list ==
	(1)	Bremen-Industriehäfen 3-way interchange A 27 E234
		Hochstraße 671 m
	(2)	Bremen-Gröpelingen
Toll point		Road toll (planned)
		Tunnel Wesertunnel 1095 m (under construction)
	(3)	Bremen-Seehausen B 212n
	(4)	Bremen-Strom
	(5)	Bremen-Neustädter Hafen
	(6)	Bremen-Neustadt B 6 B 75
		Hochstraße 1122 m
	(7)	Bremen-Airportstadt B 6
		Hochstraße 496 m
	(-)	provisorischer Anschluss B 6
		Bremen-Kattenturm (planned) B 6n
		Bremen-Habenhausen (planned)
		Kreuz Bremen-Arsten (planned) A 1 E22
