= Lübberstedt station =

Railway station in Lübberstedt, Germany

Coordinates: 53.3432°N 8.7854°E

Lübberstedt
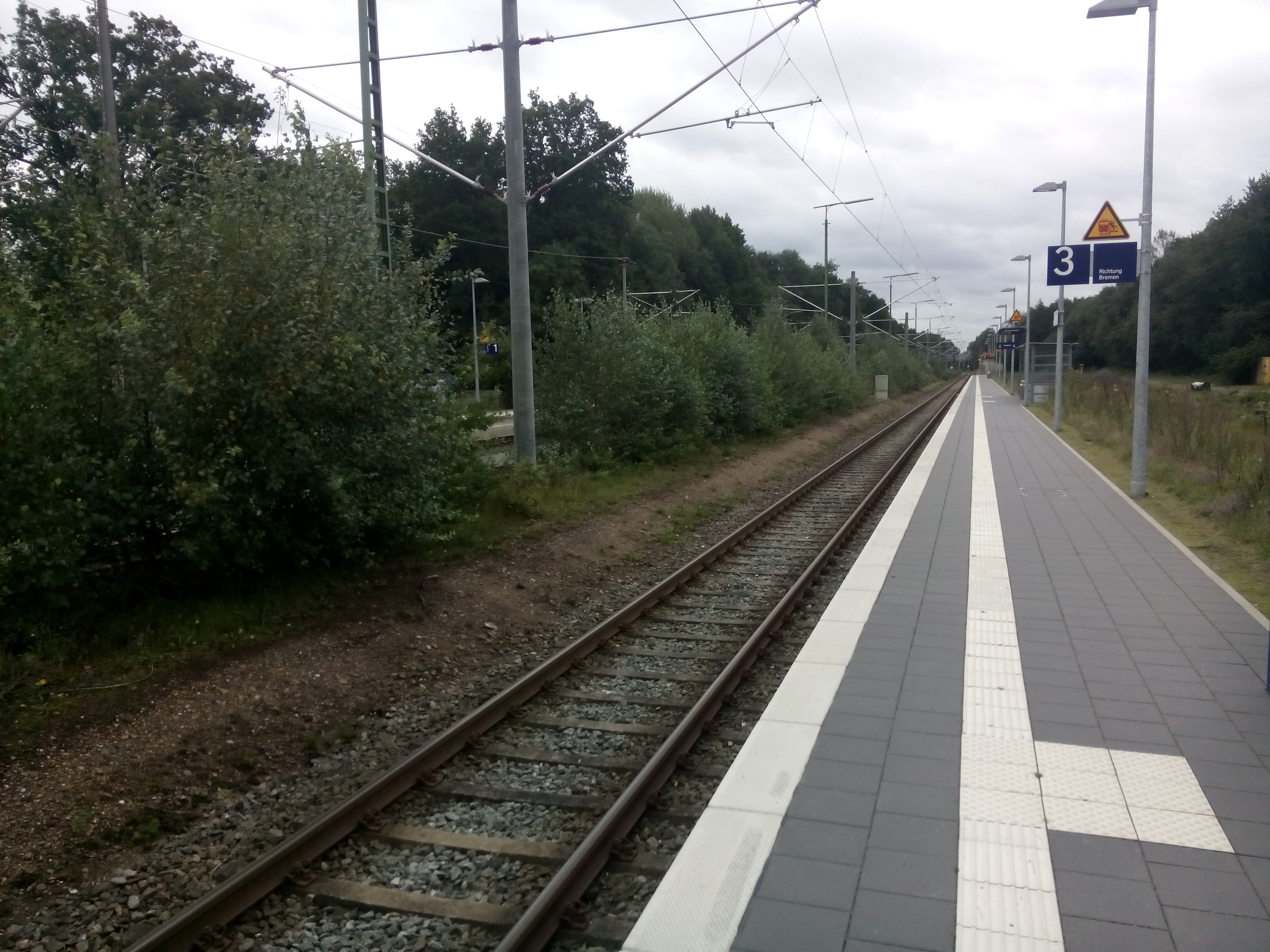
- Lübberstedt station

General information
- Location: Bahnhofstraße 33; 27729 Lübberstedt; Lübberstedt, Lower Saxony; Germany
- Platforms: 2

Other information
- Station code: 3806
- DS100 code: HLBR
- IBNR: 03773
- Category: 6
- Fare zone: VBN: 220

Services
Preceding station	Bremen S-Bahn	Following station
Stubben towards Bremerhaven-Lehe	RS2	Oldenbüttel towards Twistringen
Location

Lübberstedt is a railway station on the Bremen–Bremerhaven line, situated in the village of Lübberstedt in the district of Osterholz in Lower Saxony, one of the states of Germany.

== Operational usage ==
RegionalBahn trains from Bremerhaven to Bremen call at the station, offering an hourly connection to both cities, with some peak services during the early morning and afternoon hours.
