= Vera F. Birkenbihl =

German facilitator, writer

Vera Felicitas Birkenbihl (26 April 1946 – 3 December 2011) was a German facilitator, non-fiction writer, and esoteric.

== Life ==
Vera F. Birkenbihl was the daughter of personal trainer and management consultant Michael Birkenbihl. Trying to escape conflicts at home she quit school, but later studied psychology and journalism.

Birkenbihl started developing learning techniques in 1969. In 1970 she began giving lectures and seminars in the USA. After her return to Germany in 1972, she worked as a freelance educator and author. She lived in her home town Odelzhausen in her parents' home. Near the end of her life she lived in Osterholz-Scharmbeck. According to herself, Birkenbihl had Asperger syndrome.

In early 2011, Birkenbihl was diagnosed with esophageal cancer and underwent surgery. At the age of 65, she died of pulmonary embolism. She was buried in the cemetery of the neighbouring municipality of Hambergen.

== Work ==
In the mid-1980s, Vera F. Birkenbihl obtained some fame with a self-developed method of language learning, the "Birkenbihl method".

In seminars and publications she addressed the topics of brain-friendly learning and teaching, analytical and creative thinking, personality development, numerology, pragmatic esotericism, brain-specific sex differences and future-proof concepts. For esoterical topics, she referred to Thorwald Dethlefsen.

Birkenbihl founded a publishing company and 1973 the Institut für gehirngerechtes Arbeiten ('Institute for Brain-Friendly Work'). In 1999, she participated as an expert in the series Alpha – Sichtweisen für das dritte Jahrtausend ('Alpha – Viewpoints for the Third Millennium') on the German TV channel BR-alpha and in 2004, her TV show Kopfspiele ('Mind Games') aired with 22 episodes.

Birkenbihl had sold two million books until the year 2000. Even ten years after her death, in 2021, there were sales figures in the four-digit range each month in Germany.

Her main focus was the topic of playful knowledge transfer and corresponding learning strategies (NLLS = non-learning learning strategies), which were meant to make practical work easier for learners and teachers. Among other things she promoted the method of the ABC list.

Furthermore, she wrote regularly for media such as the German newspapers Frankfurter Allgemeine Zeitung, Harvard Business Manager (a German licensed edition of the Harvard Business Review), or Gehirn & Geist, a monthly magazine on the topics of psychology, brain research and medicine.

== Birkenbihl's learning methods ==
Since the 1990s, Birkenbihl's learning concepts were marketed as "brain-friendly". She translated this term into German as "gehirn-gerecht" and propagated it. This learning method promised to do without vocabulary drills. Birkenbihl took the view that her self-developed method was resembling the natural learning of a mother tongue.

The method contains four steps:

1. "Decoding": Work on the foreign text through a word-by-word translation, so you get used to the foreign syntax.
2. Active listening (via CD, MP3, etc.) to the foreign text while simultaneously reading the word-by-word translation from step one.
3. Passive listening to the foreign text in everyday life while doing other activities.
4. Speaking – reading – writing, depending on the pursued learning objective.

Birkenbihl proclaimed that these steps improved the understanding of the language being learned. She also emphasised the importance of the feeling for the language, which is acquired through the repetitive listening to conversations of native speakers. She also stated that one understood the grammar of the language automatically through frequent repetition of the four steps.

In order of learning to speak the new language the fourth step provides the technique of "choir-speaking". This means to listen to the foreign text and speak along.

== General and esoteric statements ==
Berkenbihl was of the opinion that boys are enrolled in German school one year too early and that co-educational classes are detrimental to them. This is because, in her view, testosterone and their budding sex drive prevent them from concentrating sufficiently on their lessons.

In her lectures Birkenbihl intensively focused on esotericism and held the view that modern physics would get closer to the esoteric world view.

In her lecture "Von Null Ahnung zu etwas Quantenphysik?" ('From 'No Clue' to a Bit of Quantum Physics?') Birkenbihl interpreted quantum physical findings from the point of view of a layperson and used them to "justify" (in her own opinion) the existence of paranormal phenomena. In doing so she attributed consciousness to the observer and called matter a possible epiphenomenon of the human mind.

Birkenbihl's approach is criticized in particular for its lack of scientific evidence, "pedagogical irresponsibility" and the promotion of pseudoscience.

== Awards ==
- 2008 Hall of Fame – German Speakers Association (part of the Global Speakers Federation)
- 2010 Coaching Award – Special achievements and merits

== Books (selection) ==
- Die persönliche Erfolgsschule. mvg-Verlag, 1973, ISBN 3-478-04090-6, ISBN 978-3-478-04090-7.
- Signale des Körpers. Körpersprache verstehen. mvg-Paperbacks, 1988, ISBN 3-478-02280-0.
- Stroh im Kopf? – Oder: Gebrauchsanleitung fürs Gehirn. 9. Auflage. GABAL, Speyer 1993.
- Die Birkenbihl-Methode: Spanisch für Fortgeschrittene 1. birkenbihl-media, 1998, ISBN 3-931084-30-2.
- Jungen und Mädchen: wie sie lernen. Knaur, 2005, ISBN 978-3-426-64235-1, ISBN 3-426-64235-2.
- Sprachenlernen leichtgemacht!: die Birkenbihl-Methode, Fremdsprachen zu lernen. mvg-Verlag, 2006, ISBN 978-3-636-07215-3.
- Stroh im Kopf? Vom Gehirn-Besitzer zum Gehirn-Benutzer. mvg-Verlag, München 2007, ISBN 978-3-636-07227-6.
- Kommunikationstraining: zwischenmenschliche Beziehungen erfolgreich gestalten. mvg-Verlag, 2007, ISBN 978-3-636-07236-8.
- Psycho-logisch richtig verhandeln: Professionelle Verhandlungstechniken. mvg-Verlag, 2007, ISBN 978-3-636-07224-5.
- Von Null Ahnung zu etwas Chinesisch. Dies ist kein Sprachkurs. mvg-Verlag, 2007, ISBN 978-3-636-06371-7.
- Von Null Ahnung zu etwas Japanisch. Dies ist kein Sprachkurs. mvg-Verlag, 2007, ISBN 978-3-636-06362-5.
- Von Null Ahnung zu etwas Arabisch. Dies ist kein Sprachkurs. mvg-Verlag, 2007, ISBN 978-3-636-06361-8.
- Von Null Ahnung zu etwas Türkisch. Dies ist kein Sprachkurs. mvg-Verlag, 2007, ISBN 978-3-636-06380-9.
- Trotzdem lernen: Lernen lernen. mvg-Verlag, München 2013, ISBN 978-3-86882-448-3.
