= Bremen-Vahr =

Vahr
- District
- Country: Germany
- State: Free Hanseatic City of Bremen
- City: Bremen
- Subdistricts: list: Gartenstadt Vahr; Neue Vahr Nord; Neue Vahr Südwest; Neue Vahr Südost

Area
  - Total: 4.337 km^{2} (1.675 sq mi)

Population (2020-12-31)
  - Total: 26,724
  - Density: 6,162/km^{2} (15,960/sq mi)
- Alien population: 19.9%
- Unemployment rate: 11.5%

Vahr (German: [faːɐ̯]) is a district of Bremen and belongs to the Bremen district East.

Vahr is located about 5 km east of the center of Bremen. The neighboring districts are Oberneuland in the north, Osterholz in the east, Hemelingen in the southeast, the eastern suburb (Östliche Vorstadt) in the southwest, Schwachhausen in the west and Horn-Lehe in the northwest.

Vahr became a district of Bremen in 1959. Because around 100,000 apartments were missing in Bremen after the Second World War, 1954 Bremen began to build the „garden city Vahr“ (Gartenstadt Vahr) with 2200 apartments in a few years. After that, „New Vahr“ (Neue Vahr) was built from 1957 to 1962 with around 11,800 apartments for 30,000 residents on 218 hectares. The structurally condensed „Kurfürstenviertel“ was built till 1972 with the so-called „Großer Kurfürst“ building.

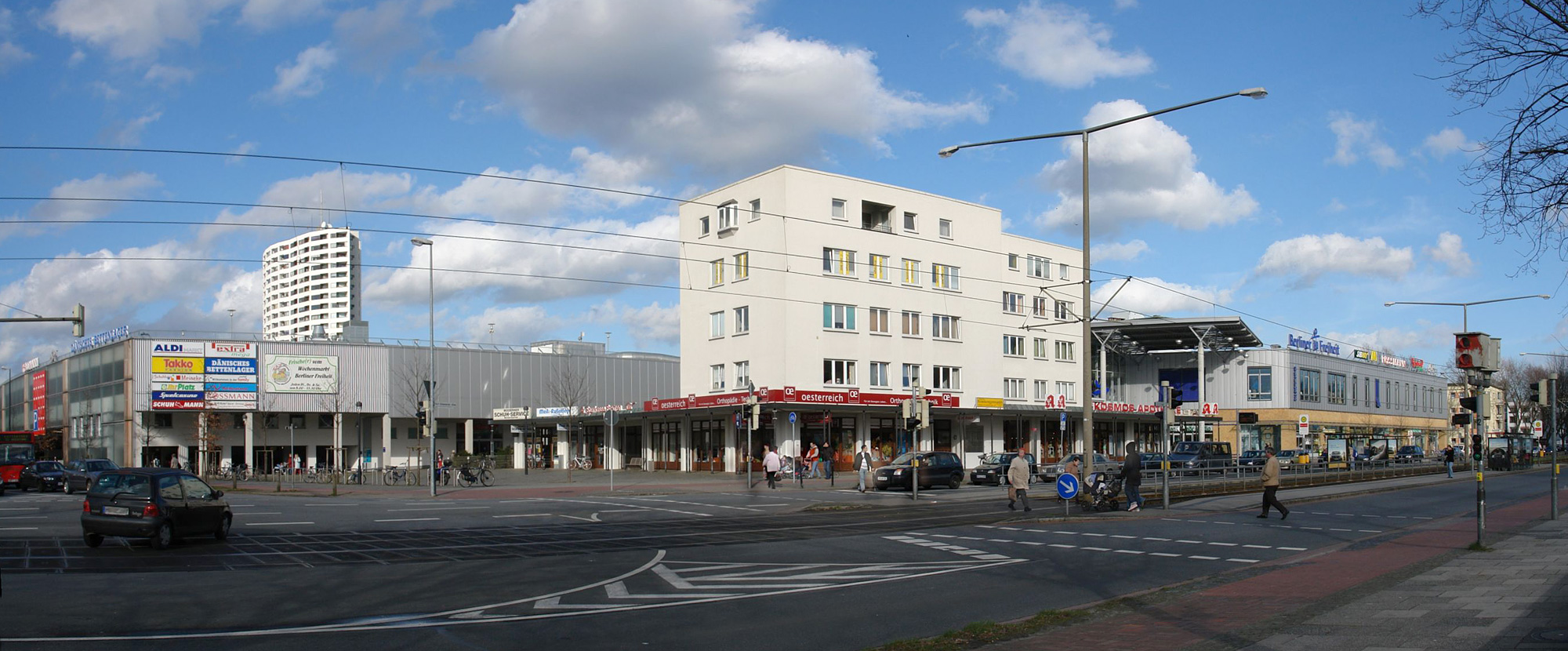
Berliner Freiheit

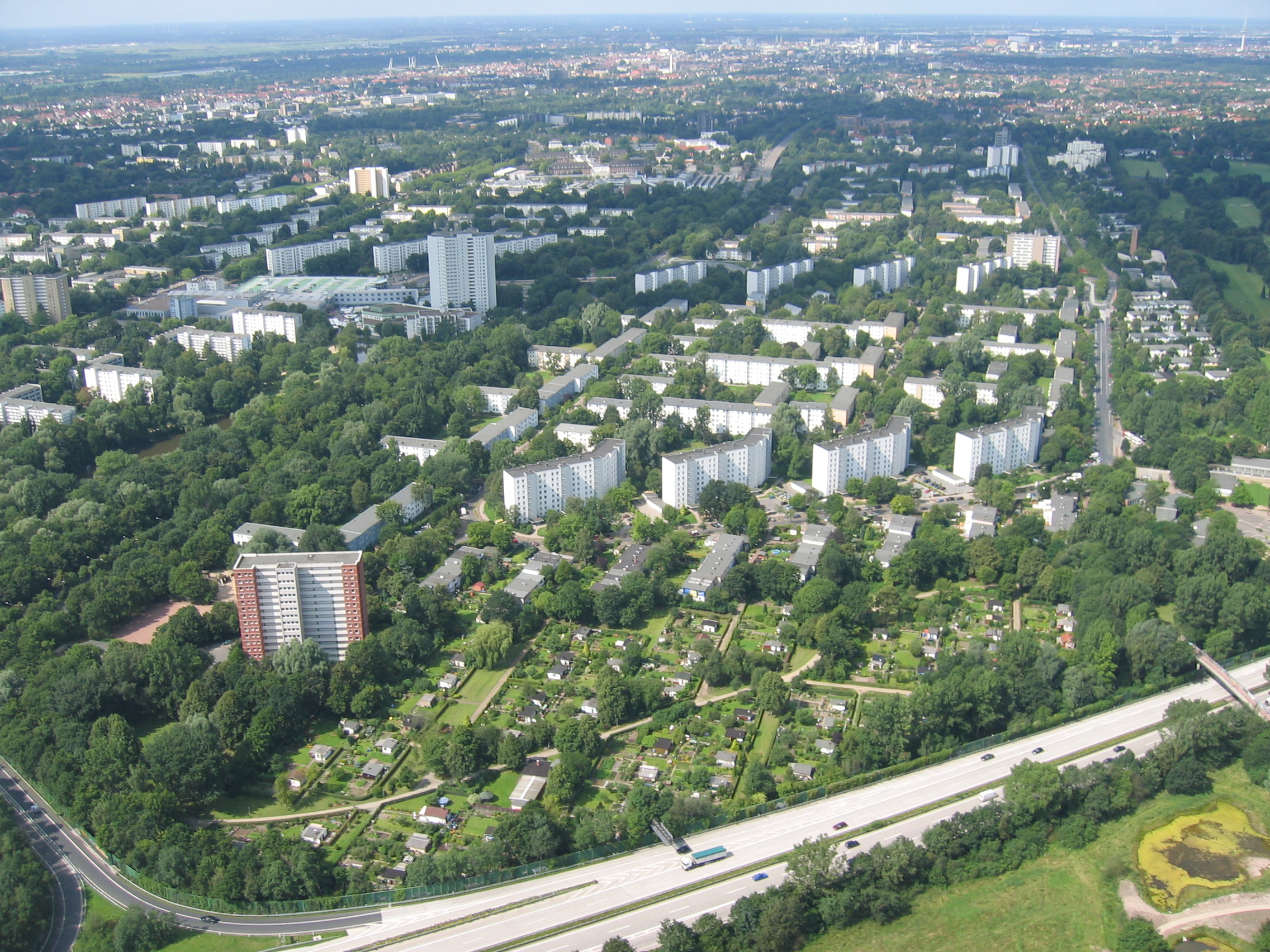
middle and right: „Neue Vahr Nord“, left: „Neue Vahr Süd“ with Aalto-Hochhaus, behind this the „Gartenstadt Vahr“, foreground A 27

Vahr is a very green large housing estate, predominantly in a row construction, in which there are also row houses and individual houses. The „Berliner Freiheit“ with a big shopping center became the center of Vahr on with the dominant landmark, the 22-story Aalto-Hochhaus, which was completed in 1961 according to the plans of the Finnish architect Alvar Aalto.

Vahr is the only district of Bremen without a center that has grown historically over centuries. Very few buildings are older than 1954. The headquarter of the Bremen Police (Polizeipräsidium Bremen) has been in Vahr since 1999. The building was erected in 1938 and previously used as a barracks.
