= Bremen Switzerland =

Geological feature

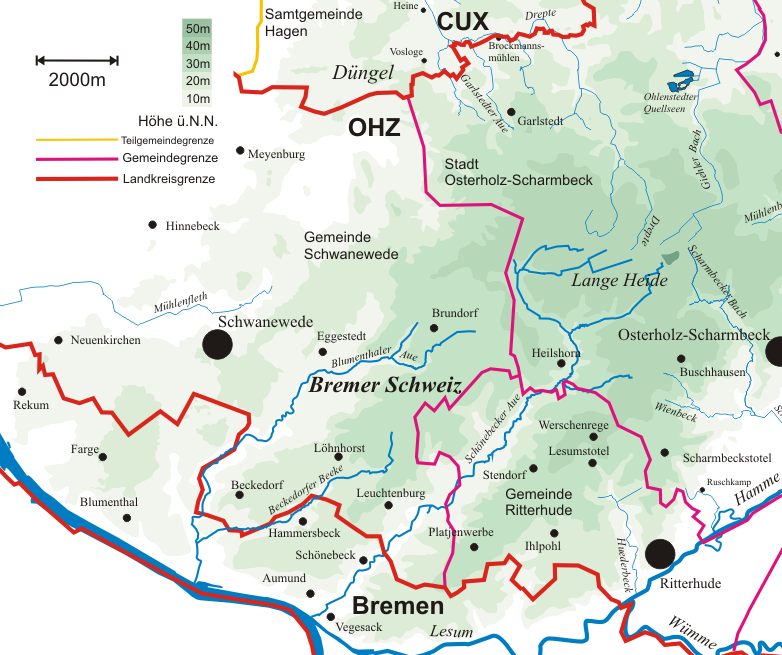
Map of Bremen Switzerland, bordered in the south by the Lesum, in the west by the Weser Marsh, the north by the Düngel Forest and the east by the Lange Heide.

Bremen Switzerland (German: Bremer Schweiz; Northern Low Saxon: Bremer Swiez) is an undulating geest landscape in the north of Bremen (Bremen Nord) and the adjacent district of Osterholz, and forms the western portion of the Osterholz Geest. In comparison to the rather flat land on which the city of Bremen is built and its surrounding area which is built on marsh and bog, Bremen Switzerland reaches heights of up to about 49 m above sea level (NN). The region of the Bremen Switzerland is framed by the Weser tributary of Lesum to the south, the Weser to the west, the marsh region of Osterstade to the northwest, the forest of Düngel to the north (Garlstedt-Meyenburg line), the former B 6 federal route to Bremerhaven (now the L135) to the east and the adjoining heath of Lange Heide.

Bremen Switzerland is divided into nature reserves, meadows, woods, heathland and depressions like the Ihle valley and the valleys of the Schönebecker Aue, the Blumenthaler Aue and the Beckedorfer Beeke. As a result, it is a favourite destination for many leisure pursuits like walking, cycling, jogging or riding. Facilities include the Bremen Switzerland Golf Course.

== See also ==
- Regions whose name incorporates "Switzerland"
