= Bremen Airport =

Airport in Bremen, Germany

Bremen Airport Flughafen Bremen
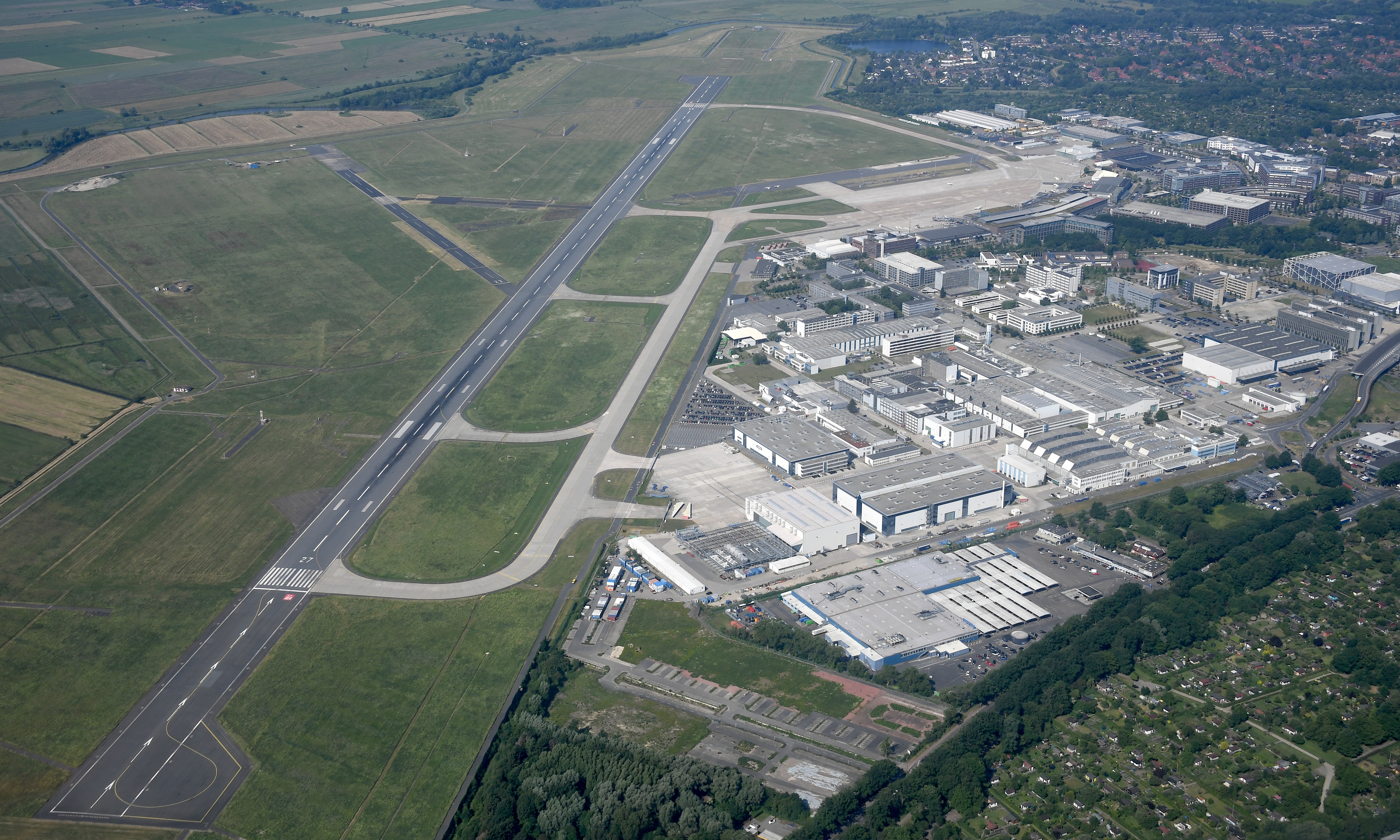
- IATA: BRE; ICAO: EDDW

Summary
- Airport type: Public
- Operator: Flughafen Bremen GmbH
- Serves: Bremen, Germany
- Elevation AMSL: 14 ft (4.3 m)
- Coordinates: 53°02′51″N 008°47′12″E
- Website: bremen-airport.com

Map
- Location of airport in Bremen

Runways
| Direction | Length | | Surface |
| Direction | m | ft | Surface |
|---|---|---|---|
| 09/27 | 2,634 | 8,642 | Asphalt |
| 23 | 700 | 2,297 | Asphalt |

Helipads
| Number | Length | | Surface |
| Number | m | ft | Surface |
|---|---|---|---|
| H1 | 30 | 98 | Grass |

Statistics (2024)
- Passengers: 1,885,848 ▲ +4,0%
- Aircraft movements: 28,429 ▲ +5,1%
- Freight (in tons): 287 ▲ +4,0%
- Source: Statistics, ADV, AIP at German air traffic control.

Bremen Airport (German: Flughafen Bremen, IATA: BRE, ICAO: EDDW) is the international airport of the city and state of Bremen in Northern Germany. It is located 3.5 km (2.2 mi) south of the city and handled 1.81 million passengers in 2023. It mainly features flights to European metropolitan and leisure destinations.

== History ==
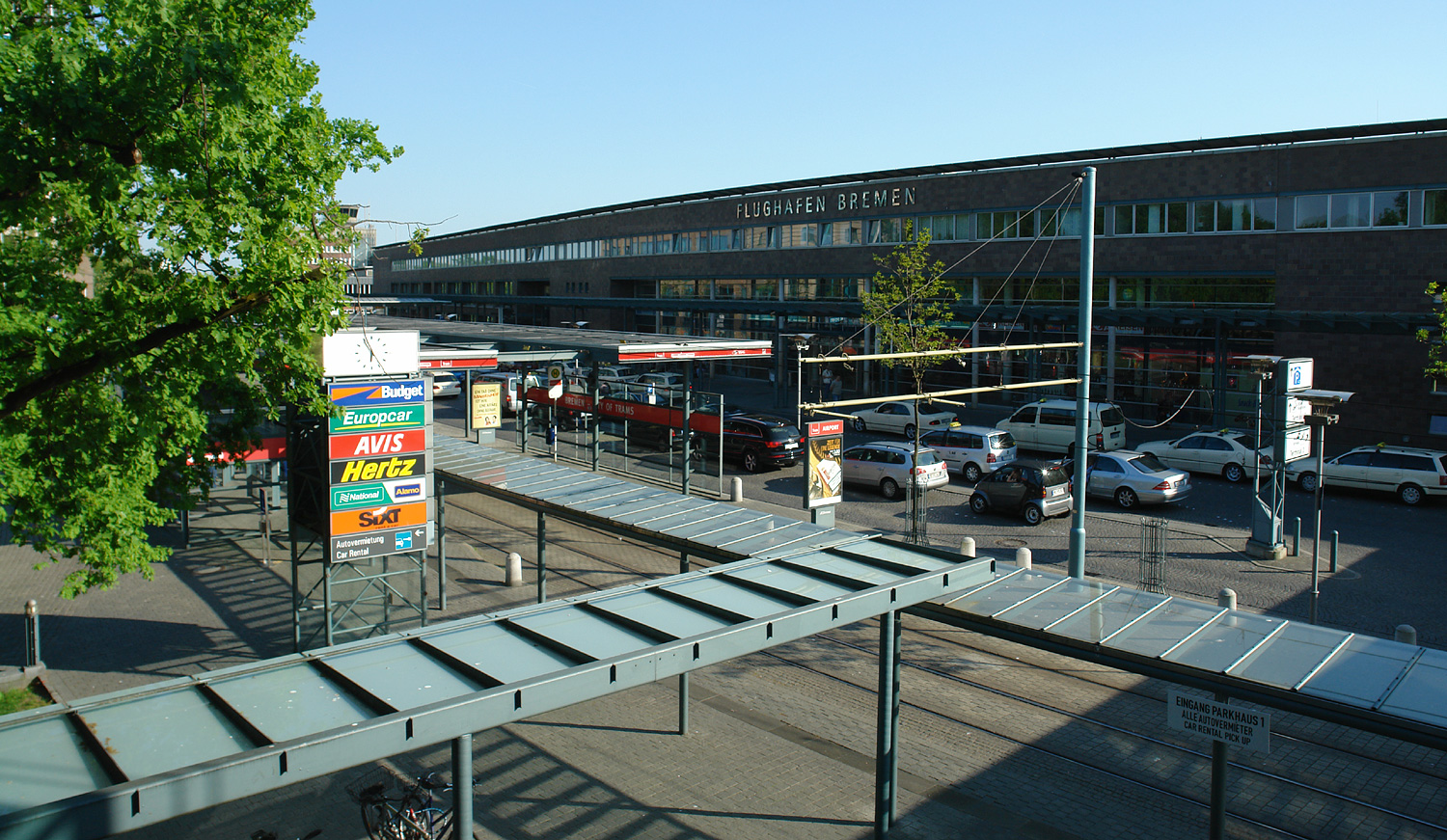
Terminal exterior

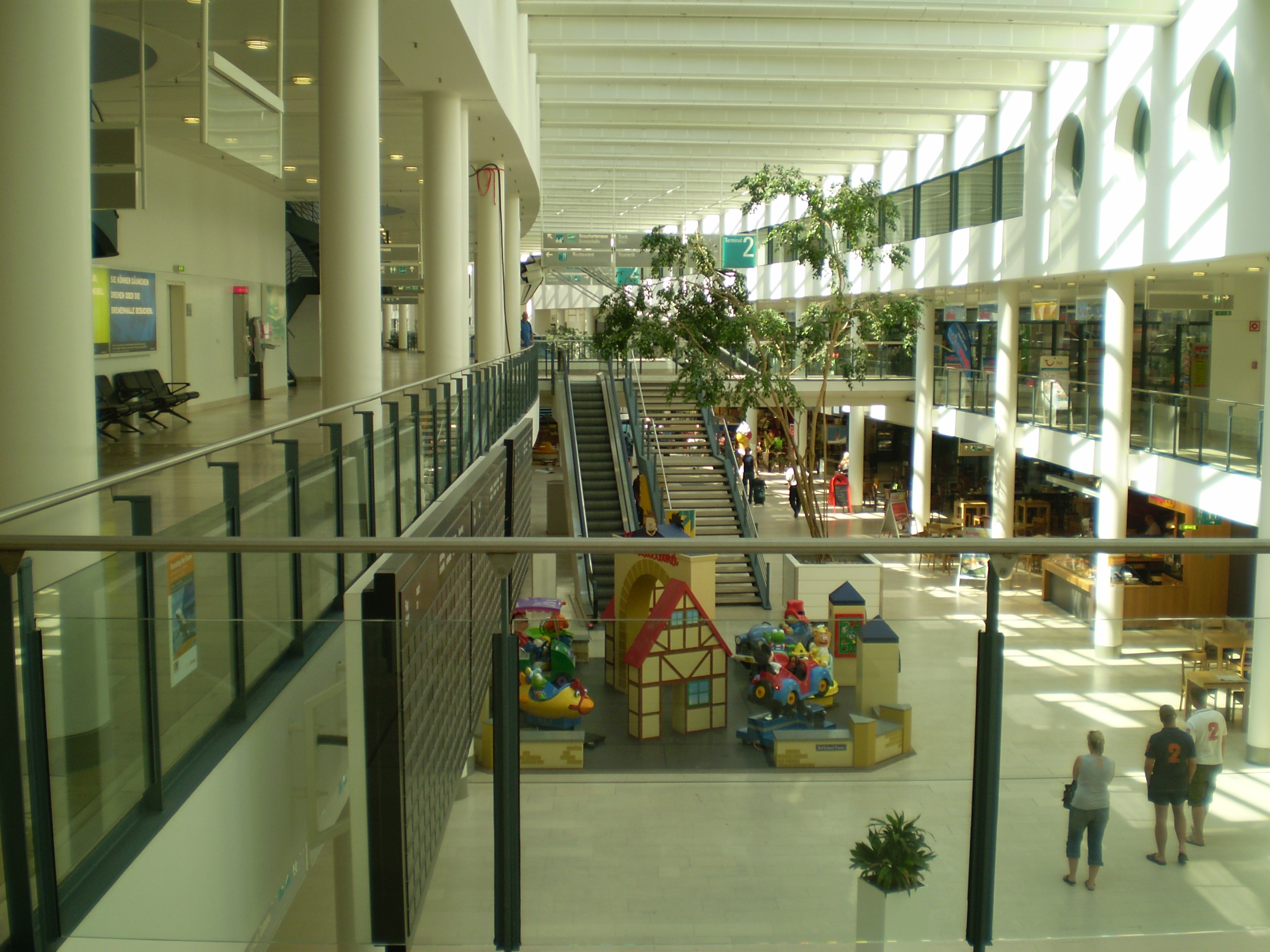
Terminal interior

=== Early years ===
The beginnings of the airport date back to the early 20th century. The Bremer Verein für Luftschiffahrt, a local aerospace club, conducted the first experimental flights at the present site in the summer of 1910, on what was then the parade ground of the local garrison. The Senate of Bremen supported the establishment of an airfield to connect Bremen to the growing airship route network. Official permission for the opening of an airport was granted on 16 May 1913. The initial infrastructure was geared towards aircraft operations instead of the initially envisaged airships. Several wooden hangars were erected.

During World War I, the airport was taken into military administration, and civilian operations ceased. The military erected a wooden hangar, but conducted only a small number of operations from the airfield. After the war, the airport only reopened on 18 July 1920, with Dutch airline KLM beginning scheduled flights to Amsterdam soon thereafter. In the same year, the Weimar National Assembly authorised investment into upgraded facilities at the airport. Administration of the airport was transferred to the newly founded Bremer Flughafengesellschaft. In 1923, the aeroplane manufacturer Focke-Wulf was founded on a site adjacent to the airfield.

=== World War II ===
In the 1930s, several new terminal buildings and hangars were constructed, with the largest to date being completed in 1937. In the same year, four new runways were built. These were arranged in a star-like pattern. The increasing military buildup under the rule of the Nazis also began to show itself at the airport, with the Luftwaffe establishing a flight training base there. Civilian operations again came to a standstill with the beginning of World War II. For a short period between November 1939 and June 1940, the airport served as the base for a squadron of Focke-Wulf Fw 200 bombers. In the later stages of the war, the airport came under repeated bombardment due to co-location with the Focke-Wulf plant. This left most of the infrastructure destroyed or severely damaged by the end of the war.

The United States Army took over the airport and the adjacent aircraft plant in 1945 for use as an airbase. After conducting the necessary repairs, it operated mostly transport aircraft into and out of the American enclave within otherwise British-occupied northern Germany. Control was handed back to the Bremen authorities in 1949. Civilian operations resumed that year with Scandinavian Airlines using Bremen Airport as a stopover on routes from Scandinavia to Geneva and Vienna. Runway 09-27 was extended to 2,000 m.

=== Development since the 1950s ===
In the mid-1950s, the terminal buildings were reconstructed and Lufthansa began scheduled flights to the airport. The German airline also established its pilot training operations (Lufthansa Flight Training) at the airport. During the 1960s, scheduled jet flights began to be operated at Bremen. In 1971, a large radar system was installed on the southern perimeter of the airport.

1989 was the first year that the airport had more than one million passengers. The current terminal building was opened in 1998.

In January 2016 the airport's operator announced that the main terminal building would undergo major redesign and renovation works until 2018. Terminal sections 1, 2 and 3 were merged amongst several other changes. In May 2016 the airport introduced its new brand with BRE Bremen Airport replacing City Airport Bremen .

In February 2017 British Airways announced it would end its flights from Bremen to London and Manchester, which were both operated by SUN-AIR. SUN-AIR maintained a base for the routes at Bremen Airport. In April 2017 the airport announced it was changing its name to Bremen Airport Hans Koschnick, after the former mayor and honorable citizen of Bremen.

In October 2018, Ryanair announced it would be closing its base at the airport on 5 November 2018. In February 2021, Lufthansa Aviation Training announced it would relocate its entire German practical training from Bremen Airport to Rostock Airport. In 2023 and 2024, Bremen Airport gained two important additional hub connections when Lufthansa Group Airlines SWISS and Austrian Airlines began scheduled routes to their hubs in Zürich and Vienna, respectively.

== Facilities ==
The airport consists of one main passenger terminal building, split into sections Terminal 1, 2 and 3 that features several shops, restaurants and service facilities as well five aircraft stands equipped with jet bridges and some additional stands for mid-sized aircraft on the apron. The main building contains the check-in counters 5–19 and 21–38. Ryanair uses another more basic facility to the west of the main terminal called Terminal E which only features walk-boarding and features the check-in counters 1E-4E.

The former Focke-Wulf site is now an Airbus manufacturing plant located adjacent to the airport and served by Airbus Beluga flights. It manufactures aircraft flaps and works on A350 wings. Airbus Defence and Space has built spacecraft including the Columbus ISS module, Automated Transfer Vehicle and European Service Module there.

The Bremenhalle inside the airport hosts a small aviation and space exploration museum, displaying the Junkers W33 Bremen and the first Spacelab module.

Bremen airport is the home airport of the Alfred Wegener Institute for Polar and Marine Research (AWI) two Basler BT-67 research aircraft Polar 5 and Polar 6. The AWI fleet was relocated to Bremen after Bremerhaven Airport was closed in 2016.

== Airlines and destinations ==
The following airlines offer regular scheduled and charter flights at Bremen Airport:

| Airlines | Destinations |
|---|---|
| Aegean Airlines | Seasonal charter: Heraklion |
| Air Anka | Seasonal charter: Antalya |
| AJet | Seasonal: Bodrum |
| Austrian Airlines | Vienna |
| Corendon Airlines | Seasonal: Antalya, Heraklion |
| Eurowings | Stuttgart; Seasonal: Palma de Mallorca |
| Freebird Airlines Europe | Seasonal: Heraklion |
| KLM | Amsterdam |
| Lufthansa | Munich, Frankfurt (resumes 28 March 2027) |
| Lufthansa City Airlines | Munich |
| Pegasus Airlines | Istanbul–Sabiha Gökçen; Seasonal: Antalya |
| Ryanair | Alicante (ends 27 March 2027), Lamezia Terme (begins 25 October 2026), London–Stansted (ends 27 March 2027), Málaga (ends 27 March 2027), Palma de Mallorca (ends 27 March 2027), Zadar (ends 27 March 2027) |
| Sundair | Fuerteventura; Seasonal: Beirut, Burgas, Gran Canaria, Heraklion, Hurghada, Monastir, Palma de Mallorca, Rhodes, Tenerife–South, Varna |
| SunExpress | Antalya, Izmir |
| Swiss International Air Lines | Zurich |
| Turkish Airlines | Istanbul |

== Statistics ==
| | Passengers | Movements | Freight (in t) |
|---|---|---|---|
| 2000 | 1,918,064 | – | – |
| 2008 | ▲2,486,337 | 46,876 | 723 |
| 2009 | ▼2,448,851 | ▼43,650 | ▲731 |
| 2010 | ▲2,676,297 | ▲46,409 | ▼539 |
| 2011 | ▼2,560,023 | ▼45,412 | ▲612 |
| 2012 | ▼2,447,007 | ▼44,737 | ▲643 |
| 2013 | ▲2,612,627 | ▼44,263 | ▼567 |
| 2014 | ▲2,773,129 | ▲45,987 | ▲721 |
| 2015 | ▼2,660,754 | ▼42,263 | ▼608 |
| 2016 | ▼2,573,501 | ▼40,687 | ▲731 |
| 2017 | ▼2,540,084 | ▼37,233 | ▼647 |
| 2018 | ▼2,561,535 | ▲38,574 | ▼626 |
| 2019 | ▼2,308,338 | ▼36,308 | ▼525 |
| 2020 | ▼594,680 | ▼20,173 | ▲1,151 |
| 2021 | ▲630,062 | ▼18,949 | ▼230 |
| 2022 | ▲1,493,007 | ▲25,083 | ▲319 |
| 2023 | ▲1,814,892 | ▲27,045 | ▼276 |
| 2024 | ▲1,887,017 | ▲28,429 | ▲287 |
^{Source: ADV}

== Ground transportation ==
=== Tram ===
Tram line 6 departs every 6 to 10 minutes (on Sunday evenings up to 20 min) to Universität Bremen via Domsheide and Hauptbahnhof. The ride takes 11 minutes to the city center, 16 minutes to the central station and 30 minutes to the university.

=== Car ===
The airport can be reached via motorway A1 (Baltic Sea – Ruhr area; Exit Arsten) and the yet only partly completed city motorway A281 which crosses the city of Bremen.

== See also ==
- List of airports in Germany
- Transport in Germany
