= Odelzhausen =

- Municipality
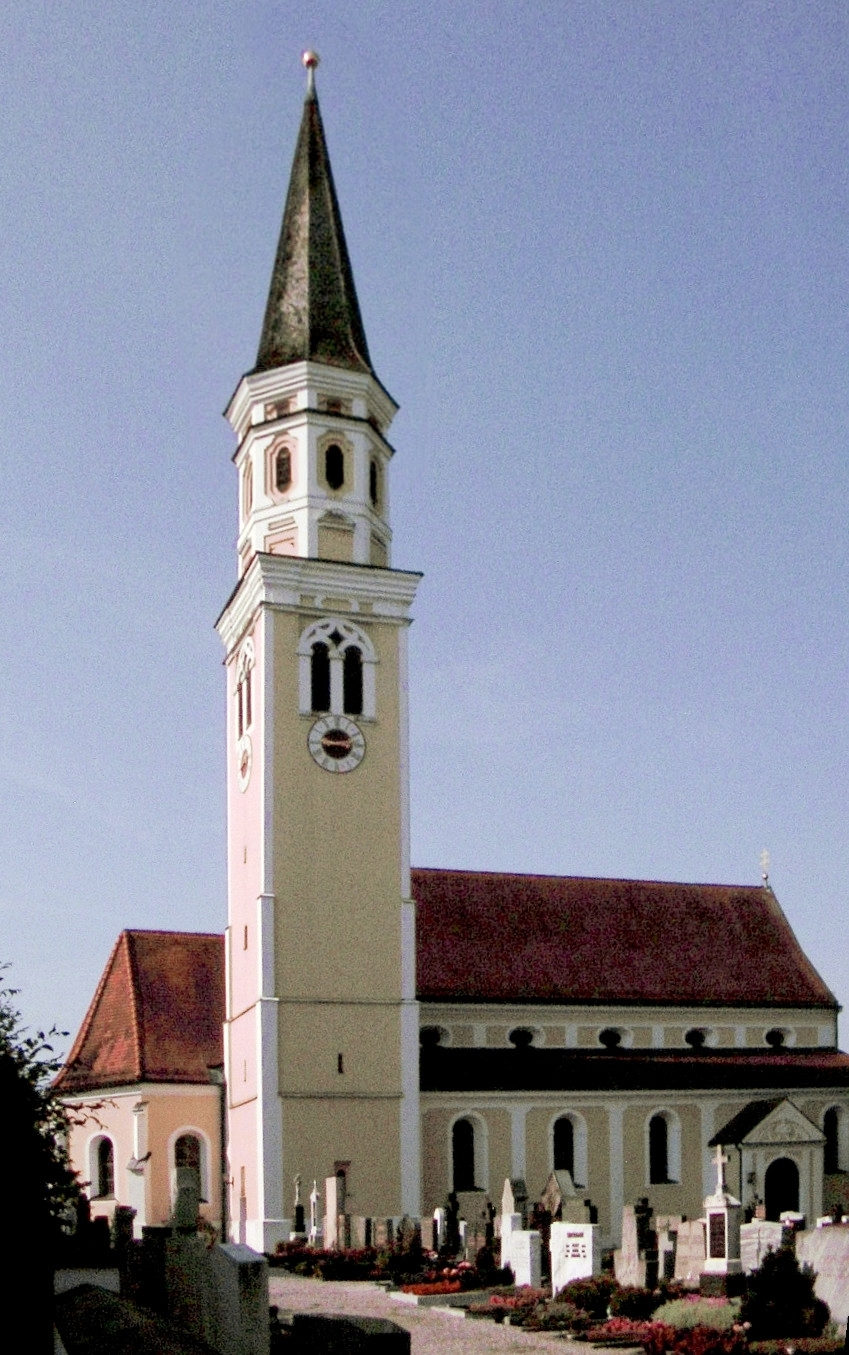
- Saint Benedict Church

- Coat of arms

- Location of Odelzhausen within Dachau district
- Interactive map of Odelzhausen
- Location within Germany Location within Bavaria
- Coordinates: 48°19′N 11°11′E
- Country: Germany
- State: Bavaria
- Admin. region: Upper Bavaria
- District: Dachau
- Subdivisions: 14 Ortsteile

Government
  - Mayor (2020–26): Markus Trinkl (FW)

Area
  - Total: 30.48 km^{2} (11.77 sq mi)
- Elevation: 499 m (1,637 ft)

Population (2025-12-31)
  - Total: 5,727
  - Density: 187.9/km^{2} (486.6/sq mi)
- Time zone: UTC+01:00 (CET)
  - Summer (DST): UTC+02:00 (CEST)
- Postal codes: 85235
- Dialling codes: 08134
- Vehicle registration: DAH
- Website: www.odelzhausen.de

Odelzhausen is a village (Pfarrdorf) and a municipality in the west of the district of Dachau in Upper Bavaria, Germany.

Odelzhausen is situated along the A 8 Autobahn, which connects Munich and Stuttgart. The distance to Augsburg City Centre is 32,4 km (20.1 miles), to Munich City Centre 38,3 km (23.8 miles). No light rail connects it directly to Munich, but three bus lines connect the municipality with the Dachau and Munich-Pasing station. On-demand taxi lines are being phased in to improve public transport.

The town celebrated 1200 years of existence in 2014. The town has a Bavarian Red Cross station, shops, hotels, and the historic castle contains the Schloss Hotel and Bavarian restaurant. There is also the par 72 Golf Club Munich-West. Of architectural interest is the Parish church St. Benedikt.

== Geography ==
=== Area members ===
The municipality of Odelzhausen comprises 14 official local areas.

- Dietenhausen
- Ebertshausen
- Essenbach
- Gaggers
- Hadersried
- Höfa
- Lukka und Todtenried
- Miegersbach
- Roßbach
- Odelzhausen
- St. Johann
- Sittenbach
- Sixtnitgern
- Taxa

The following boundaries exist: Ebertshausen, Höfa, Odelzhausen, Sittenbach, Taxa.

== History ==
- The first name of the village was "Otolteshusir" in 814.
- The name came from Otolt or Odholt - the oldest clan in the area, which live there around 600 or earlier.
- The village was built next to the brook, as there were sufficient pasture fields for a farming community.
- Odelzhausen has a castle, that was built by 1247. The owners changed often, there were noble and civilian owners, and owners that were only interested in the attached brewery. Today the castle still has a functioning brewery, and also functions as a hotel and restaurant.
- In the middle of the 14th century the old and decrepit Roman road was replaced with country roads from Munich through Dachau and Odelzhausen, heading to Freising and Augsburg.
- For the first time in 1440 the village earner the designation "Hofmark" - signaling a right of self-rule for the village and its district.
- During the 30 Year War the village incurred a heavy toll. The church was burnt down, the castle was plundered.
- Since around 1700 there has been a school in Odelzhausen, used by the people in neighboring areas.
- Since 1803 Odelzhausen has possessed "Das Marktrecht", or the ability to host markets.

=== Population growth ===
The population count for the area was 2323 in 1970, 3,211 in 1987 and 3,998 in 2000.

== Notable people ==
- Vera F. Birkenbihl, (1946-2011), facilitator, non-fiction writer, and esoteric.
