= Bouches-du-Weser =

Former French department (1811–1814)

Coordinates: 53.08°N 8.81°E

Location of Bouches-du-Weser in France (1812)

Bouches-du-Weser (French: [buʃ.dy.vɛ.zɛʁ]; "Mouths of the Weser"; German: Wesermündungen, Low German: Wersermünnen) was a department of the First French Empire in present-day Germany.

== Department ==
It was formed in 1811, when the region was annexed by France. Prior to the Napoleonic occupation, its territory had been divided between the Free Hanseatic City of Bremen, the duchy of Oldenburg, and the Hanoverian duchies of Bremen and Verden, the latter of which had intermittently been incorporated into the Kingdom of Westphalia in 1807. Its territory is part of the current German states of Lower Saxony and Bremen. Its capital was Bremen (French: Brême).

The department was subdivided into the following arrondissements and cantons (situation in 1812):

- Bremen, cantons: Achim, Bremen (4 cantons), Lilienthal, Ottersberg, Rotenburg, Syke, Thedinghausen and Verden.
- Bremerlehe, cantons: Beverstedt, Bremerlehe, Dorum, Hagen im Bremischen, Osterholz and Vegesack.
- Nienburg, cantons: Alt-Bruchhausen, Bassum, Hoya, Liebenau, Nienburg, Rethem, Stolzenau, Sulingen and Walsrode.
- Oldenburg, cantons: Berne, Burhave, Delmenhorst, Elsfleth, Hatten, Oldenburg, Ovelgönne, Rastede, Varel and Westerstede.

Its population in 1812 was 327,175.

After Napoleon was defeated in 1814, the department was divided between the Kingdom of Hanover, the Duchy of Oldenburg, and the Free Hanseatic City of Bremen.
