= Hambergen (Samtgemeinde) =

Samtgemeinde in Lower Saxony, Germany

- Samtgemeinde
- Location of Hambergen within Osterholz district
- Interactive map of Hambergen
- Location within Germany Location within Lower Saxony
- Coordinates: 53°18′N 8°51′E
- Country: Germany
- State: Lower Saxony
- District: Osterholz
- Seat: Hambergen
- Subdivisions: 5 municipalities

Area
  - Total: 135.3 km^{2} (52.2 sq mi)

Population (2025-12-31)
  - Total: 11,821
  - Density: 87.37/km^{2} (226.3/sq mi)
- Time zone: UTC+01:00 (CET)
  - Summer (DST): UTC+02:00 (CEST)
- Website: www.hambergen.de

Hambergen is a Samtgemeinde ("collective municipality") in the district of Osterholz, in Lower Saxony, Germany. Its seat is in the village Hambergen.

The Samtgemeinde Hambergen consists of the following municipalities:

1. Axstedt
2. Hambergen
3. Holste
4. Lübberstedt
5. Vollersode
