= Holste =

- Municipality
- Coat of arms

- Location of Holste within Osterholz district
- Interactive map of Holste
- Location within Germany Location within Lower Saxony
- Coordinates: 53°22′N 08°50′E
- Country: Germany
- State: Lower Saxony
- District: Osterholz
- Municipal assoc.: Hambergen
- Subdivisions: 4 Ortsteile

Government
  - Mayor: Gerhard Müller

Area
  - Total: 35.37 km^{2} (13.66 sq mi)
- Elevation: 27 m (89 ft)

Population (2025-12-31)
  - Total: 1,359
  - Density: 38.42/km^{2} (99.51/sq mi)
- Time zone: UTC+01:00 (CET)
  - Summer (DST): UTC+02:00 (CEST)
- Postal codes: 27729
- Dialling codes: 04748
- Vehicle registration: OHZ

Holste (German pronunciation: [ˈhɔlstə]) is a municipality in the district of Osterholz, in Lower Saxony, Germany.

It comprises three originally separate municipalities: Hellingst, Oldendorf and Steden, its name being a combination of those names.

It belonged to the Prince-Archbishopric of Bremen. In 1648 the Prince-Archbishopric was transformed into the Duchy of Bremen, which was first ruled in personal union by the Swedish and from 1715 on by the Hanoverian Crown. In 1823 the Duchy was abolished, and its territory became part of the Stade Region.
