= Scharmbecker Bach =

River in Germany

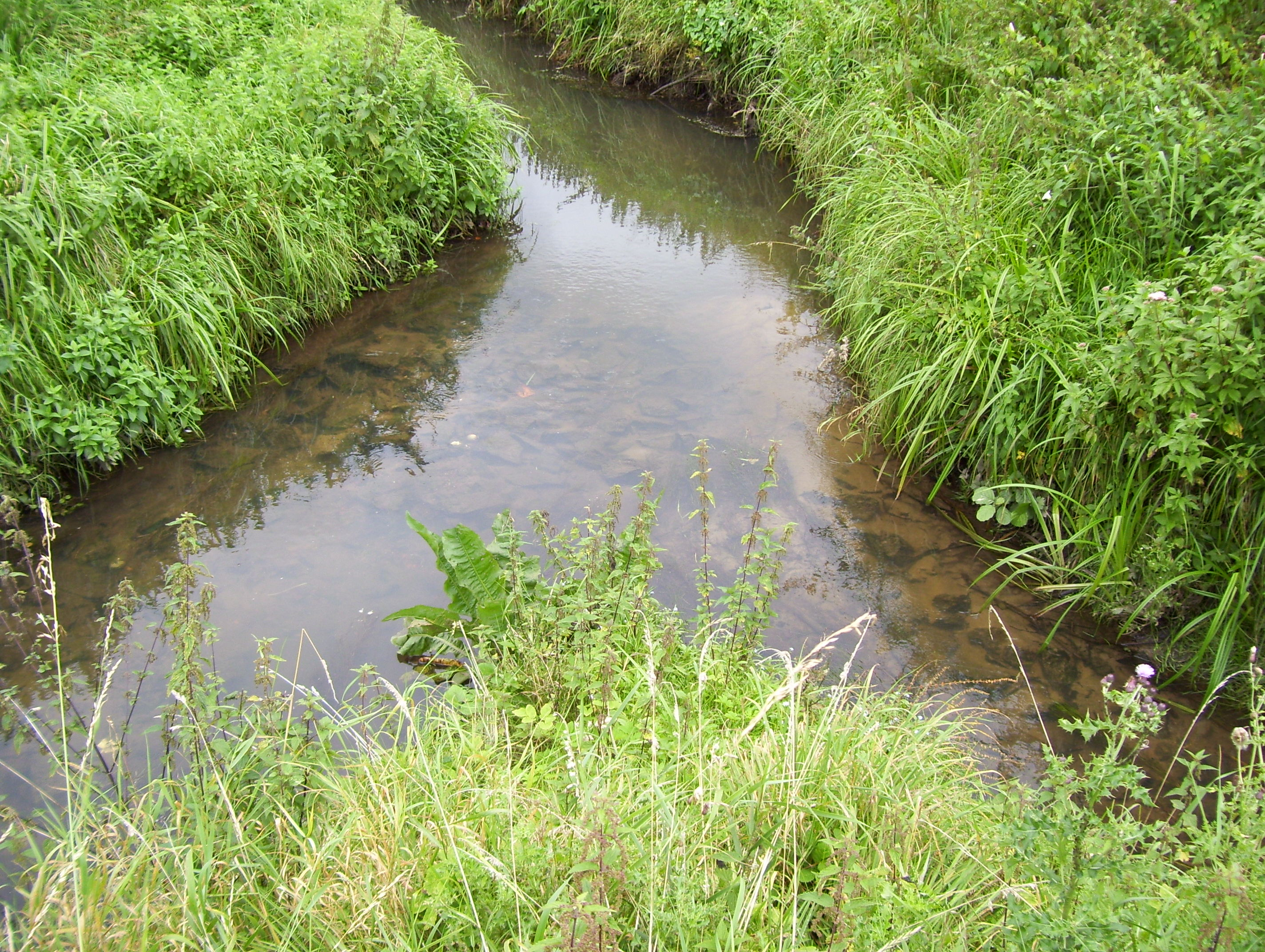

Location
- Country: Germany
- States: Lower Saxony

Physical characteristics
- Mouth: Hamme
  - coordinates: 53.1973°N 8.8072°E

Basin features
- Progression: Hamme→ Lesum→ Weser→ North Sea

Scharmbecker Bach is a river of Lower Saxony, Germany. It flows into the Hamme south of Osterholz-Scharmbeck.

== See also ==
- List of rivers of Lower Saxony
