= Aalto-Hochhaus =

High-rise apartment building in Bremen, Germany

Aalto-Hochhaus Building
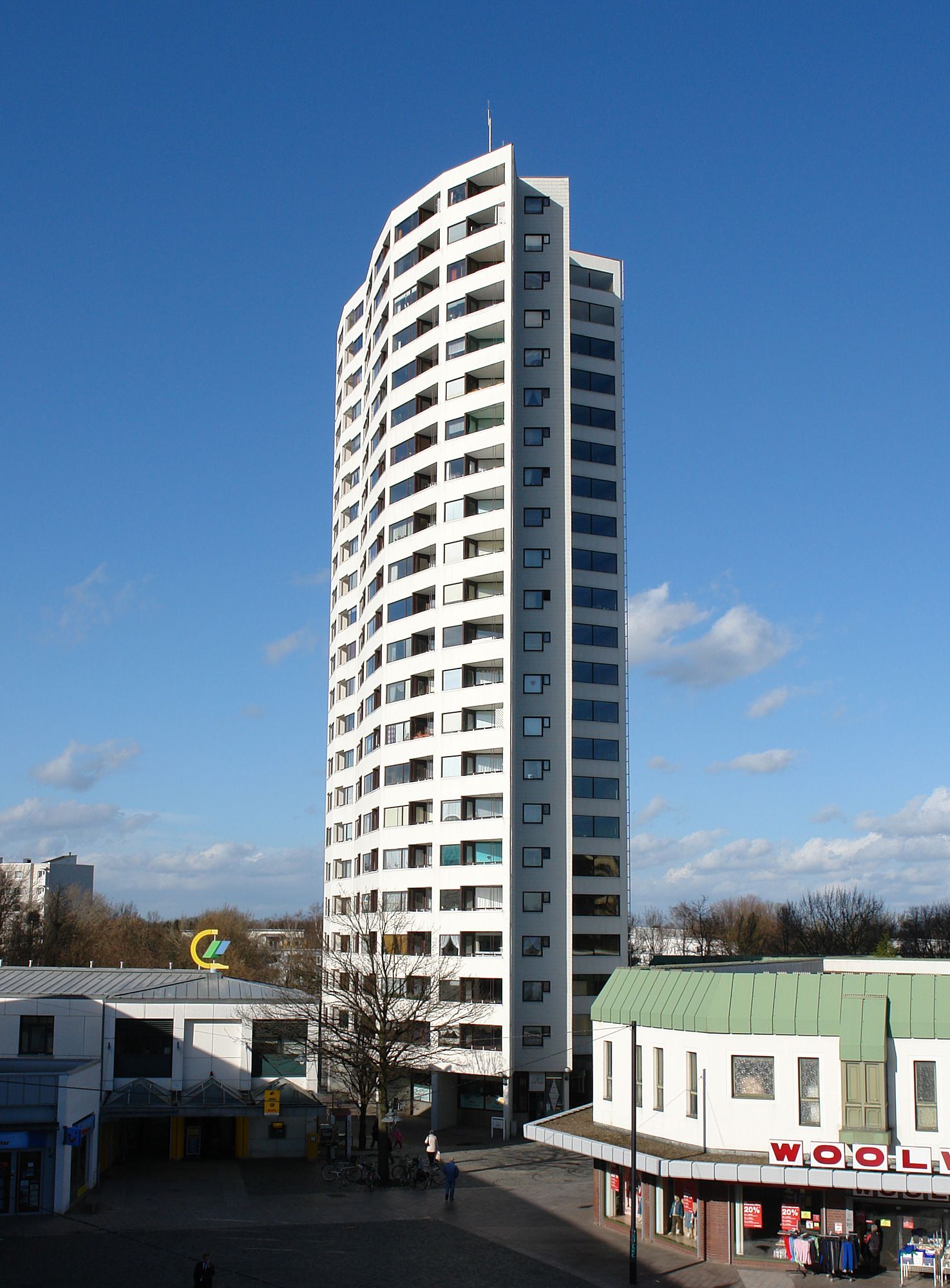
- Interactive map of the Aalto-Hochhaus Building area

General information
- Location: Bremen, Germany
- Coordinates: 53°04′54″N 8°53′36″E
- Completed: 1962

Technical details
- Floor count: 22

Design and construction
- Architect: Alvar Aalto

Aalto-Hochhaus is a 22-floor high-rise apartment building in Bremen, Germany, designed by Alvar Aalto. It is approximately 65 m (213 ft) tall and was completed in 1962. Since 1998, it is protected by the monument protection act.

== See also ==
- Alvar Aalto buildings
