= Bundesstraße 6 =

Federal highway in Germany

B 6
- Bundesstraße 6

Route information
- Length: 550 km (340 mi)

Location
- Country: Germany
- States: Lower Saxony, Bremen, Saxony-Anhalt, Saxony

Highway system
- Roads in Germany; Autobahns; List; Federal; List; State; E-roads

The Bundesstraße 6 (abbr. B6) is a German federal highway running from Bremerhaven on the North Sea coast in a southeasterly direction through the states of Lower Saxony, Bremen, Saxony-Anhalt and Saxony to Görlitz on the Polish border.

== History ==
East of Leipzig, the B6 (except of the ring roads around Meißen, Dresden and Bischofswerda) largely follows the historic course of the Via Regia Lusatiae Superioris, part of the medieval Via Regia.

In 1937, the northwestern section of the former Reichsstraße 6 (R6) was extended from Bremerhaven (Wesermünde) to Cuxhaven. Before World War II and the implementation of the Oder–Neisse line, the R6 road continued southeastwards from Görlitz via Hirschberg (present-day Jelenia Góra, Poland) and Schweidnitz (Świdnica) to the Silesian capital Breslau (Wrocław) and from there via Oels (Oleśnica) as far as the former Polish border near Groß Wartenberg (Syców). The sections between Görlitz/Zgorzelec and Syców then became part of the Polish National road 4 (today largely replaced by the A4 autostrada) and the National road 8.

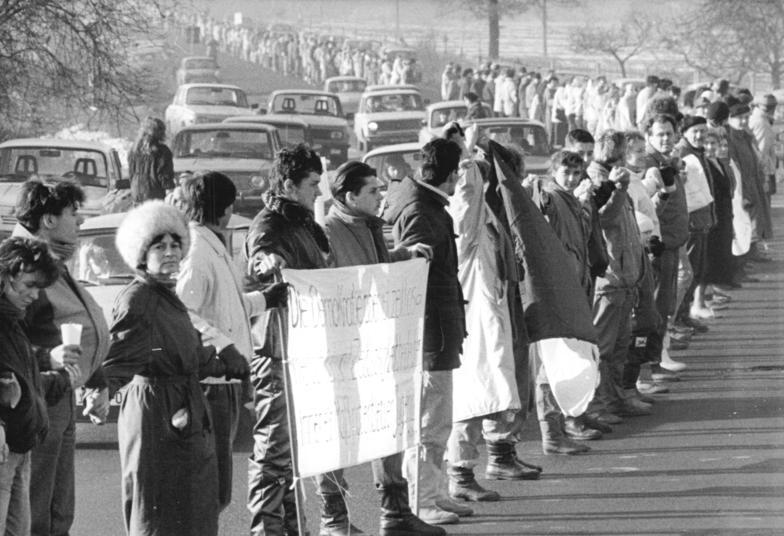
Die Wende 1989: Human chain along the F6 in Dresden-Bühlau

In the days of German partition, the section on East German territory was known as the F6 (Fernverkehrsstraße 6 or "trunk road"). In Dresden the road went past the headquarters of VEB Tabakkontor Dresden, a tobacco firm formerly known as Yenidze. This led to the urban myth that the road had given its name to the cigarette brand f6.

As a result of the opening of the A 27 motorway between Cuxhaven and Bremen-Nord (formerly Bremen-Burglesum) in the mid- to late-1970s the B6 was replaced by the A 27. Until that point the B6 had linked the two cities of Bremen and Bremerhaven in the state of Bremen and also connected them to Cuxhaven.

The old route in Cuxhaven from the start (Poststraße/Deichstraße crossroads), apart from the Rohdestraße as far as the branch to the motorway slip road at Altenwalde junction was renamed the B73. The rest of the route to Bremen, with the exception of a short section in Bremerhaven, was downgraded to Landesstraße 135.

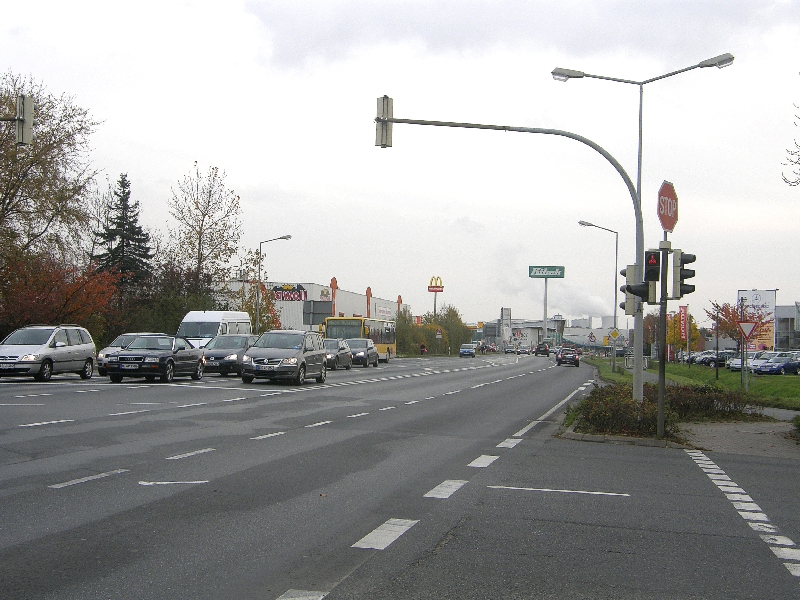
The B6 in Garbsen

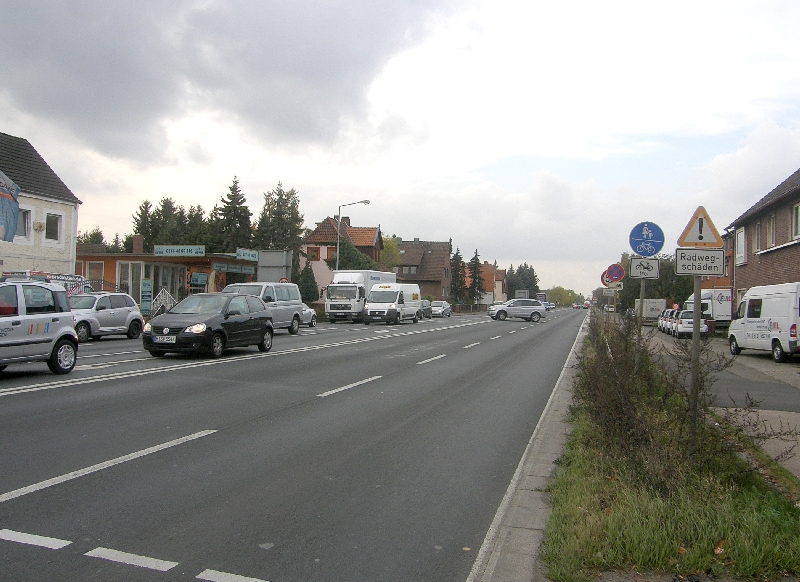
The B6 in Garbsen

== See also ==
- List of federal roads in Germany
- B 6n – new four-lane B6 road
