= Hambergen =

- Municipality
- Coat of arms

- Location of Hambergen within Osterholz district
- Interactive map of Hambergen
- Location within Germany Location within Lower Saxony
- Coordinates: 53°19′N 08°49′E
- Country: Germany
- State: Lower Saxony
- District: Osterholz
- Municipal assoc.: Hambergen

Government
  - Mayor: Gerd Brauns (SPD)

Area
  - Total: 30.33 km^{2} (11.71 sq mi)
- Elevation: 27 m (89 ft)

Population (2025-12-31)
  - Total: 5,576
  - Density: 183.8/km^{2} (476.2/sq mi)
- Time zone: UTC+01:00 (CET)
  - Summer (DST): UTC+02:00 (CEST)
- Postal codes: 27729
- Dialling codes: 04793
- Vehicle registration: OHZ
- Website: www.hambergen.de

Hambergen (German pronunciation: [ˈhambɛʁɡn̩]) is a municipality in the district of Osterholz, in Lower Saxony, Germany. It is situated approximately 10 km north of Osterholz-Scharmbeck, and 25 km north of Bremen.

It belonged to the Prince-Archbishopric of Bremen. In 1648 the Prince-Archbishopric was transformed into the Duchy of Bremen, which was first ruled in personal union by the Swedish and from 1715 on by the Hanoverian Crown. In 1823 the Duchy was abolished and its territory became part of the Stade Region.

Hambergen is also the seat of the Samtgemeinde ("collective municipality") Hambergen.
