= Axstedt =

- Municipality
- Coat of arms

- Location of Axstedt within Osterholz district
- Interactive map of Axstedt
- Location within Germany Location within Lower Saxony
- Coordinates: 53°21′23″N 8°46′29″E
- Country: Germany
- State: Lower Saxony
- District: Osterholz
- Municipal assoc.: Hambergen

Government
  - Mayor: Jürgen Rhau (CDU)

Area
  - Total: 10.74 km^{2} (4.15 sq mi)
- Elevation: 15 m (49 ft)

Population (2025-12-31)
  - Total: 1,210
  - Density: 113/km^{2} (292/sq mi)
- Time zone: UTC+01:00 (CET)
  - Summer (DST): UTC+02:00 (CEST)
- Postal codes: 27729
- Dialling codes: 04748
- Vehicle registration: OHZ
- Website: www.axstedt.de

Axstedt (German pronunciation: [ˈaksˌʃtɛt]; Low German: Ax) is a municipality in the district of Osterholz, in Lower Saxony, Germany.

It belonged to the Prince-Archbishopric of Bremen. In 1648 the Prince-Archbishopric was transformed into the Duchy of Bremen, which was first ruled in personal union by the Swedish and from 1715 on by the Hanoverian Crown. In 1823 the Duchy was abolished and its territory became part of the Stade Region.
