= Vollersode =

- Municipality
- Coat of arms

- Location of Vollersode within Osterholz district
- Interactive map of Vollersode
- Location within Germany Location within Lower Saxony
- Coordinates: 53°20′N 08°55′E
- Country: Germany
- State: Lower Saxony
- District: Osterholz
- Municipal assoc.: Hambergen
- Subdivisions: 8 Ortsteile

Government
  - Mayor: Angela Greff (SPD)

Area
  - Total: 46.49 km^{2} (17.95 sq mi)
- Elevation: 3 m (9.8 ft)

Population (2025-12-31)
  - Total: 2,987
  - Density: 64.25/km^{2} (166.4/sq mi)
- Time zone: UTC+01:00 (CET)
  - Summer (DST): UTC+02:00 (CEST)
- Postal codes: 27729
- Dialling codes: 04793
- Vehicle registration: OHZ

Vollersode (German pronunciation: [ˈfɔlɐzoːdə]; Low German: Vollerso) is a municipality in the district of Osterholz, in Lower Saxony, Germany.

It belonged to the Prince-Archbishopric of Bremen. In 1648 the Prince-Archbishopric was transformed into the Duchy of Bremen, which was first ruled in personal union by the Swedish and from 1715 on by the Hanoverian Crown. In 1823 the Duchy was abolished and its territory became part of the Stade Region.
