= Altenwalde =

- Ortsteil of Cuxhaven
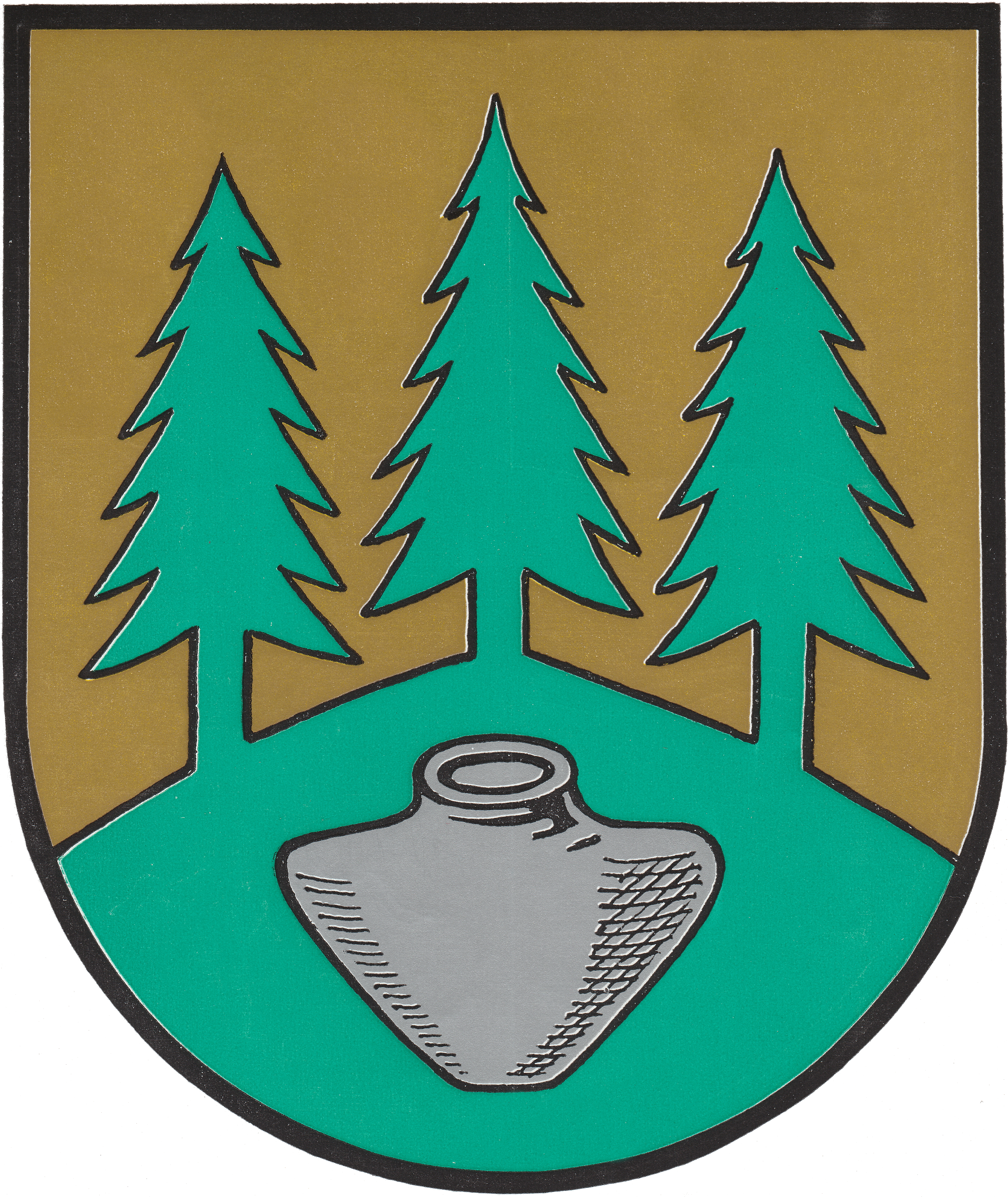
- Coat of arms

- Location in the town of Cuxhaven
- Interactive map of Altenwalde
- Location within Germany Location within Lower Saxony
- Coordinates: 53°48′57″N 08°39′37″E
- Country: Germany
- State: Lower Saxony
- District: Cuxhaven
- Town: Cuxhaven

Area
  - Total: 25.03 km^{2} (9.66 sq mi)

Population (2017)
  - Total: 6,158
  - Density: 246.0/km^{2} (637.2/sq mi)
- Time zone: UTC+01:00 (CET)
  - Summer (DST): UTC+02:00 (CEST)
- Postal codes: 27478
- Dialling codes: 04723

Altenwalde is a village in the town of Cuxhaven in Lower Saxony.

Altenwalde was first mentioned in 1282 as Wolde.

On July 1, 1972, Altenwalde was incorporated into Cuxhaven.

== Twin towns ==
- Saint-Avé, France
