= Osterholz =

District in Lower Saxony, Germany

Coordinates: 53°15′N 8°50′E

- District
- Flag Coat of arms
- Country: Germany
- State: Lower Saxony
- Capital: Osterholz-Scharmbeck

Government
  - District admin.: Kim Fürwentsches (Greens)

Area
  - Total: 650.73 km^{2} (251.25 sq mi)

Population (31 December 2025)
  - Total: 113,340
  - Density: 174.17/km^{2} (451.11/sq mi)
- Time zone: UTC+01:00 (CET)
  - Summer (DST): UTC+02:00 (CEST)
- Vehicle registration: OHZ
- Website: landkreis-osterholz.de

Osterholz is a district (Landkreis) in Lower Saxony, Germany. It is bounded by (from the west and clockwise) the districts of Wesermarsch, Cuxhaven, Rotenburg and Verden, and by the city of Bremen.

== History ==
Originally the prince-archbishops of Bremen ruled the area comprising today's district. In 1648 the Prince-Archbishopric was transformed into the Duchy of Bremen, which was first ruled in personal union by the Swedish and from 1715 on by the Hanoverian Crown. In 1807 the ephemeral Kingdom of Westphalia annexed the Duchy, before France annexed it in 1810, there comprising a part of the département Bouches-du-Weser. In 1813 the Duchy was restored to the Electorate of Hanover, which - after its upgrade to the Kingdom of Hanover in 1814 - incorporated the Duchy in a real union and the Ducal territory became part of the Stade Region, established in 1823. In 1866 the Kingdom of Hanover fell to Prussia, forming the Province of Hanover. The Prussian administration established districts in 1885, among them the district of Osterholz.

== Geography ==
The southern part of the district is part of the Bremen metropolitan area. In the north there is the Teufelsmoor ("dead moor" (lit. "devil's moor")), one of the largest existing fens in Germany. Large marshes extend on both sides of the River Hamme, which runs through the district from north to south to join the River Wümme. The Wümme forms the southern border and is a tributary of the Weser; the Weser forms the western border of Osterholz.

== Coat of arms ==
The coat of arms displays:

- the heraldic key from the arms of Bremen
- a ship on the water, symbolising the peat ships of the 19th century

== Towns and municipalities ==
Clickable map of towns and municipalities in the district

Towns
1. Osterholz-Scharmbeck

Free municipalities

1. Grasberg
2. Lilienthal
3. Ritterhude
4. Schwanewede
5. Worpswede
Samtgemeinden

1. Hambergen

1. Axstedt
2. Hambergen^{1}
3. Holste
4. Lübberstedt
5. Vollersode

^{1}seat of the Samtgemeinde

== Notable people ==
- Cord Asendorf Sr. (1858–1944), businessman
