= Osterholz-Scharmbeck =

- Town
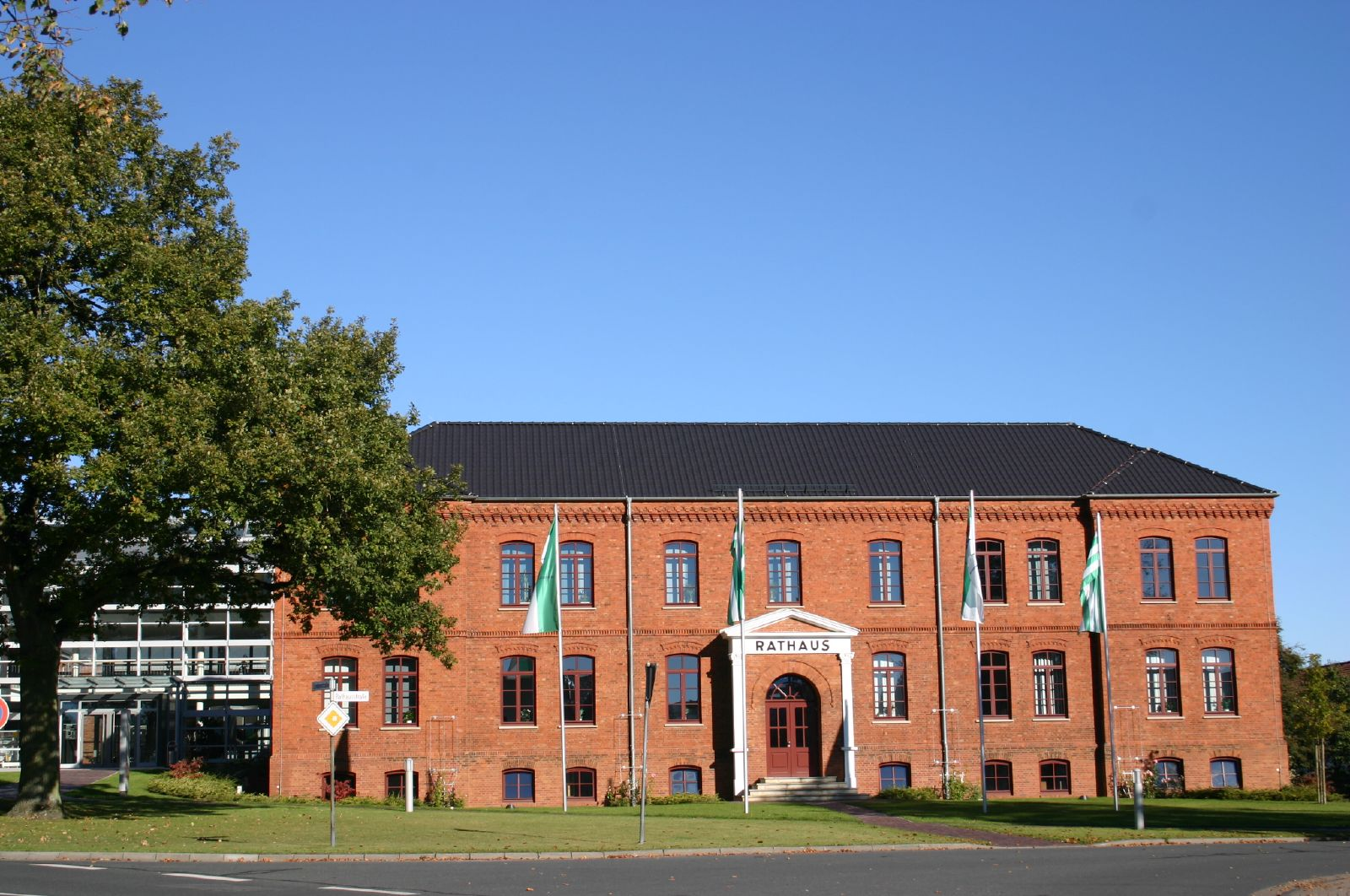
- Town hall

- Flag Coat of arms

- Location of Osterholz-Scharmbeck within Osterholz district
- Interactive map of Osterholz-Scharmbeck
- Location within Germany Location within Lower Saxony
- Coordinates: 53°13′N 8°48′E
- Country: Germany
- State: Lower Saxony
- District: Osterholz
- Subdivisions: 10 districts

Government
  - Mayor (2021–26): Torsten Rohde (Ind.)

Area
  - Total: 147.17 km^{2} (56.82 sq mi)
- Elevation: 11 m (36 ft)

Population (2025-12-31)
  - Total: 29,757
  - Density: 202.19/km^{2} (523.68/sq mi)
- Time zone: UTC+01:00 (CET)
  - Summer (DST): UTC+02:00 (CEST)
- Postal codes: 27711
- Dialling codes: 04791
- Vehicle registration: OHZ
- Website: www.osterholz-scharmbeck.de

Osterholz-Scharmbeck (German pronunciation: [ˈoːstɐˌhɔlts ˈʃaʁmbɛk]; Low German: Oosterholt-Scharmbeek) is a town and the capital of the district of Osterholz, in Lower Saxony, Germany. Osterholz-Scharmbeck is situated between the cities of Bremen and Bremerhaven.

== Geography ==
=== Neighbouring places ===
- Bremen (22 km)
- Delmenhorst (31 km)
- Achim (37 km)
- Bremerhaven (39 km)
- Brake (40 km)
- Zeven (41 km)
- Bremervörde (43 km)
- Nordenham (46 km)
- Oldenburg (48 km)
- Rotenburg (50 km)

=== Division of the town ===
==== Official parts ====
- Freißenbüttel
- Garlstedt
- Heilshorn
- Hülseberg
- Ohlenstedt
- Pennigbüttel
- Sandhausen
- Scharmbeckstotel
- Teufelsmoor

==== Historical parts ====
- Ahrensfelde
- Altenbrück
- Altendamm
- Auf Dem Raden
- Auf Dem Rusch
- Bargten
- Bredbeck
- Buschhausen
- Büttel
- Feldhof
- Haslah
- Hinter Dem Horn
- Kattenhorn
- Lange Heide
- Lintel
- Muskau
- Myhle
- Niedersandhausen
- Ovelgönne
- Ruschkamp
- Settenbeck
- Vorwohlde
- Westerbeck
- Wiste

== History ==
The town was first mentioned in 1043 as Scirnbeci. From 1180, the Scharmbeck belonged to the Prince-Archbishopric of Bremen. The monastery in Osterholz was founded in 1182 and persisted until 1650, when Lower Saxony became mostly Protestant. In 1648 the Prince-Archbishopric was transformed into the Duchy of Bremen, which was first ruled in personal union by the Swedish and from 1715 on by the Hanoverian Crown. In 1823 the Duchy was abolished and its territory became part of the Stade Region in the Kingdom of Hanover.

In 1927, the two communities of Osterholz and Scharmbeck were merged under the name of Osterholz-Scharmbeck and in 1929 town privileges were granted.

Between 1978 and 1992, 4,200 soldiers of the U.S. Army's 2nd Armored Division (Forward) were stationed, and another 4,000 family members resided in Osterholz-Scharmbeck.

=== Population growth ===
- 1904: 4.701
- 1909: 6,060
- 1945: 12,500
- 1961: 19,258
- 1987: 24,150
- 2004: 31,145
- 2005: 31,055
- 2010: 30,218

== Mayor ==
The mayor is Torsten Rohde (independent). He was elected in May 2014 with 59.02% of the votes. The predecessor was Martin Wagener (SPD).

== Notable people ==
- Roland Baar (born 1965), rowing sportsman
- Eduard Neumann (1903–1985), professor and rector of the Free University of Berlin
- Bodo Ramelow (born 1956), politician (The Left), Minister President of Thuringia 2014-2024
- Jimmy Fallon's paternal grandmother, Luise Schalla came from here
- Vera F. Birkenbihl (1946-2011), facilitator, non-fiction writer, and esoteric
- Michael Carter (Colorado politician), politician

== Books ==
- Friedrich Kühlken: Zwischen Niederweser und Niederelbe – Eine Heimatkunde des Landes Bremen und des Niedersächsischen Regierungsbezirks Stade. Osterholz-Scharmbeck 1950.
- Reelf Menckhoff: Chronik von Osterholz-Scharmbeck – Band 1: Von den Anfängen bis 1929. Stadt Osterholz-Scharmbeck 2004.
- Jürgen Meyer-Korte, Rolf Metzing: Osterholz-Scharmbeck: Picture and Development of a City. Saade, Osterholz-Scharmbeck 1979.
- Johann Segelken: Osterholz-Scharmbecker Heimatbuch. Saade, Osterholz-Scharmbeck 1987, ISBN 3-922642-18-7.
- Ernstheinrich Meyer-Stiens: Heimliche Hauptstraße, die Bahnhofstraße in Osterholz-Scharmbeck 1865 – 1929 – 1945 – 1999. Menschen, Ereignisse und Innenansichten einer norddeutschen Kleinstadt. Saade, Osterholz-Scharmbeck 2000, ISBN 3-922642-40-3.
