= Beverstedt (Samtgemeinde) =

- Samtgemeinde
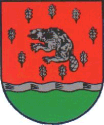
- Coat of arms

- Location of Beverstedt within Cuxhaven district
- Interactive map of Beverstedt
- Location within Germany Location within Lower Saxony
- Coordinates: 53°26′06″N 08°49′09″E
- Country: Germany
- State: Lower Saxony
- District: Cuxhaven
- Disbanded: 1 November 2011
- Subdivisions: 9 municipalities

Area
  - Total: 197.60 km^{2} (76.29 sq mi)
- Elevation: 10 m (33 ft)

Population (2010-12-31)
  - Total: 13,694
  - Density: 69.302/km^{2} (179.49/sq mi)
- Time zone: UTC+01:00 (CET)
  - Summer (DST): UTC+02:00 (CEST)
- Postal codes: 27616
- Dialling codes: 04747, 04748, 04749
- Vehicle registration: CUX
- Website: www.beverstedt.de

Beverstedt is a former Samtgemeinde ("collective municipality") in the district of Cuxhaven, in Lower Saxony, Germany. Its seat was in the town Beverstedt. It was disbanded on 1 November 2011, when its constituent municipalities merged into the municipality Beverstedt.

The Samtgemeinde Beverstedt consisted of the following municipalities:

- Appeln
- Beverstedt
- Bokel
- Frelsdorf
- Heerstedt
- Hollen
- Kirchwistedt
- Lunestedt
- Osterndorf
- Stubben
