= Lune (Weser) =

River in Germany

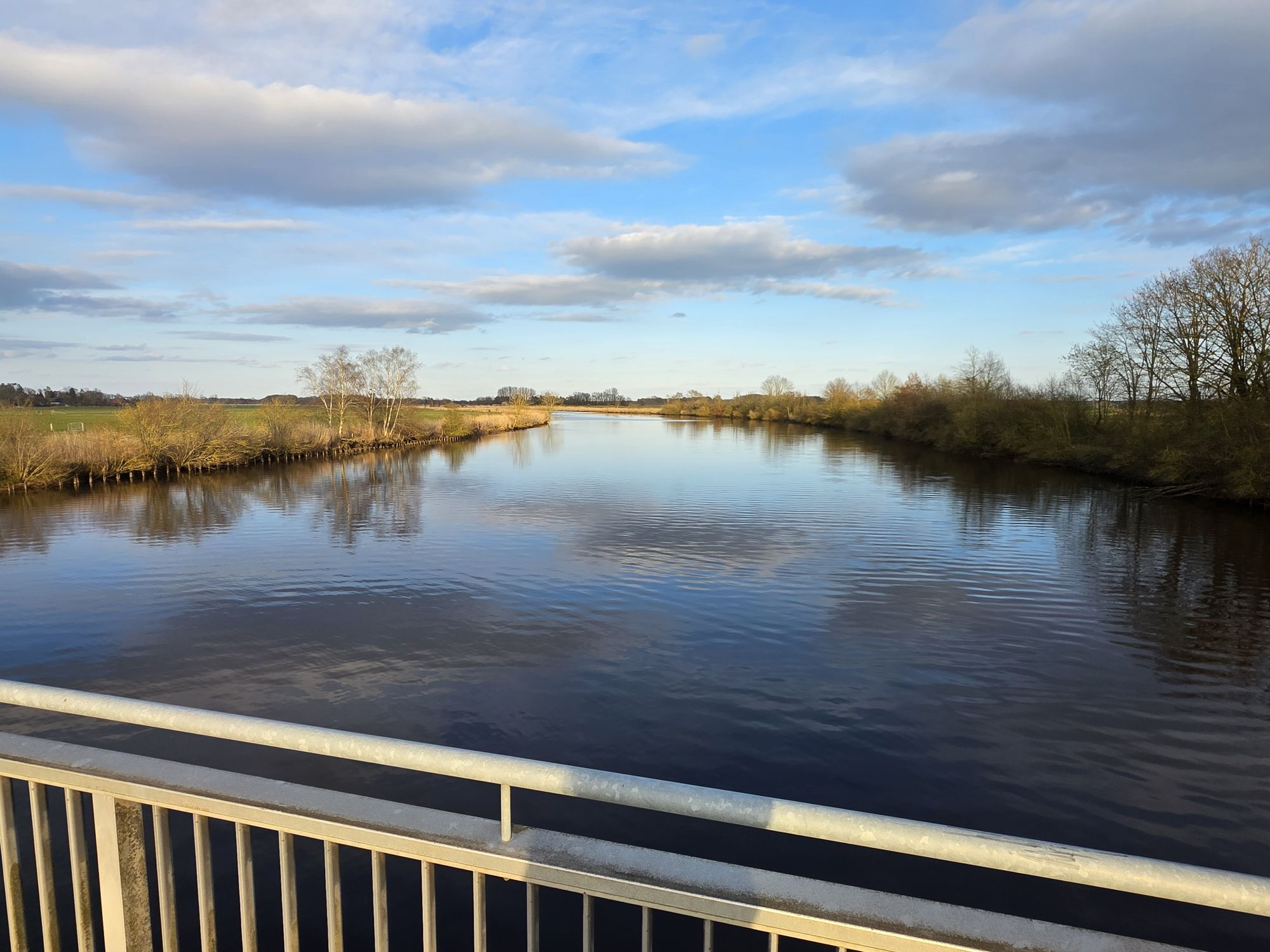

- Course of the River Lune and its tributaries

Location
- Country: Germany
- State: Lower Saxony

Physical characteristics
- Source
  - location: south of Hipstedt
  - coordinates: 53°27′50″N 8°57′10″E
  - elevation: 16 m above sea level (NN)
- Mouth
  - location: Alte Lune: southeast of Fischereihafen (Bremerhaven), Neue Lune: south of Dedesdorf (Loxstedt) into the Weser
  - coordinates: 53°25′13″N 8°30′13″E
  - elevation: 2 m above sea level (NN)
- Length: 41.4 km (25.7 mi)
- Basin size: 383 km^{2} (148 sq mi)

Basin features
- Progression: Weser→ North Sea
- Landmarks: Villages: Kirchwistedt, Stemmermühlen, Beverstedt, Lunestedt, Düring, Stotel, Nesse, Büttel, Neuenlande; Lanhausen (=Alte Lune)
- Tributaries
  - left: Volkmarster Lune, Altwistedter Lune, Wellener Bach, Billerbeck, Gackau
  - right: Beverstedter Bach, Dohrener Bach, Loxstedt- Düringer Moorkanal; Rohr (=Alte Lune)

Lune is a river in Lower Saxony, Germany. It is some 41 kilometres (25 mi) long and a right tributary of the Lower Weser.

The Lune is a small lowland river, which is joined initially by the Volkmarster Lune on the boundary between the borough of Bremervörde and the district of Cuxhaven. Between Kirchwistedt and Stemmermühlen is its confluence with the Altwistedter Lune, and it then flows through Beverstedt, Lunestedt, Nesse near Loxstedt and Lanhausen to the Lunesiel south of the Fischereihafen district of Bremerhaven. Until the beginning of the 17th century the river was a major transport artery and navigable until Deelbrügge (nowadays a district of Beverstedt). It was named after the explorer Gerhard von Lune who lived between 1602 and 1666^{[2]}

== See also ==
- List of rivers of Bremen
- List of rivers of Lower Saxony

== Sources ==
- Anke Breitlauch (editor): Die Lune – ein Fluß wird verlegt. Published by Wasser- und Bodenverband Untere Lune, Lunestedt 1987.
