= List of shipwrecks in November 1879 =

The list of shipwrecks in November 1879 includes ships sunk, foundered, grounded, or otherwise lost during November 1879.

== 1 November ==
List of shipwrecks: 1 November 1879
Ship	State	Description
Augerona	United Kingdom	The ship departed from Montrose, Forfarshire for Great Yarmouth, Norfolk. No further trace, presumed foundered with the loss of all hands.
City of Rochester	United Kingdom	The steamship ran aground on the Potato Garth. She was on a voyage from Rochester, Kent to Sunderland, County Durham. She was refloated.
Edward	United Kingdom	The ship was severely damaged by an onboard explosion at Newport, Monmouthshire. Several crew were severely wounded.
Exhibition	(United Kingdom of Great Britain and Ireland) Jersey	The smack foundered 30 nautical miles (56 km) north west of Guernsey, Channel Islands. Her crew took to a boat; they were rescued the next day by the brig Jacques Cartier (France). Exhibition was on a voyage from Tréguier, Côtes-du-Nord, France to Weymouth, Dorset.
Garmouth	United Kingdom	The steamship departed from Gijón for Valencia, Spain. No further trace, posted missing, presumed foundered with the loss of all eight crew.
Hugh Streatfield	United Kingdom	The steamship ran aground in the Seine at Berville-sur-Seine, Seine Inférieure, France and was wrecked. Her crew were rescued. She was on a voyage from Swansea, Glamorgan to Rouen, Seine-Inférieure.
Lydia	United Kingdom	The steamship ran aground in the River Avon. She was refloated and taken into the King Road.
Mechanic	United Kingdom	The ship put in to Louisbourg, Nova Scotia, Canada in a severely damaged condition. She was on a voyage from London to Providence, Rhode Island, United States. She was consequently condemned.
Rivingen	Norway	The barque was driven ashore west of Calais, France. Her crew were rescued.
Sea Wave	United Kingdom	The barque was driven ashore at East London, Cape Colony. Her crew were rescued. She was a total loss.
Xantho	United Kingdom	The steamship ran aground off Saltholm, Denmark. She was on a voyage from Hull, Yorkshire to Kronstadt, Russia. She was refloated with assistance and resumed her voyage.

== 2 November ==
List of shipwrecks: 2 November 1879
Ship	State	Description
Albert	United Kingdom	The steam trow caught fire and sank at Avonmouth, Somerset. She was on a voyage from Chepstow, Monmouthshire to Avonmouth.
Anna A. Rich	United Kingdom	The ship foundered between Mallorca and Minorca, Spain. Her crew were rescued.
Florence and Johanna	United Kingdom	The smack was run down and sunk in the Fleet by the fishing smack Emerald (United Kingdom) with the loss of five of her six crew. The survivor was rescued by the cutter Spark (United Kingdom)
Heimdahl	Germany	The steamship was abandoned off Terschelling, Friesland, Netherlands with the loss of two of her 28 crew. Survivors took to two boats; they were rescued by the schooner Dean and by Plover (both United Kingdom). Heimdahl was on a voyage from Nicholaieff, Russia to Bremerhaven.
Ithaca	United States	The lumber schooner ran aground at Saint Joseph, Michigan in a snowstorm and broke up, a total wreck. Her six crew and one passenger were rescued by the United States Life Saving Service.
Ratatockwer	Norway	The barque ran aground in Aalbek Bay. Her crew were rescued. She was on a voyage from Riga, Russia to the Nieuw Diep.

== 3 November ==
List of shipwrecks: 3 November 1879
Ship	State	Description
Adirondack	United Kingdom	The steamship was damaged by fire. She was on a voyage from New York, United States to Liverpool, Lancashire. The fire was extinguished.
Harriet McBeath	United Kingdom	The ship departed from Saint John, New Brunswick, Canada for Bristol, Gloucestershire. No further trace,. presumed foundered with the loss of all ten crew.
Negro	United Kingdom	The ship was driven ashore and wrecked at "Grand Valley", Canada. She was on a voyage from Montreal, Quebec, Canada to Cork.
Poti	Spain	The brig was wrecked at San Javier. She was on a voyage from Torrevieja to Avilés.
Reindeer	United States	The lumber schooner ran aground at Lincoln Park, Chicago in a snowstorm, a total wreck. Part of her cargo was salvaged. Her two crewmen were rescued by the United States Life Saving Service.
Souvenir	France	The brigantine foundered in the English Channel with the loss of her captain. Survivors were rescued by the steamship Shildon (United Kingdom). Souvenir was on a voyage from Bilbao, Spain to Dunkirk, Nord.
Violet	United Kingdom	The schooner sprang a leak and was abandoned off Grand Manan, New Brunswick, Canada. Her crew were rescued by Henry (United Kingdom). Violet was on a voyage from Moncton, New Brunswick to Boston, Massachusetts, United States.
Wild Wave	United Kingdom	The ship struck rocks and sank at Beachy Head, Sussex.

== 4 November ==
List of shipwrecks: 4 November 1879
Ship	State	Description
Angerona	United Kingdom	The ship departed from Johnshaven, Aberdeenshire for Great Yarmouth, Norfolk. No further trace, posted missing.
Cheerful	United Kingdom	The smack was driven ashore at Dungeness, Kent.
Milky Way	United Kingdom	The schooner collided with the steamship Spray (United Kingdom) and sank 12 nautical miles (22 km) off the Danish coast. Her ccrew were rescued by Spray. Milky Way was on a voyage from Fraserburgh, Aberdeenshire to Königsberg, Germany.
Norge	Norway	The ship departed from Miramichi, New Brunswick, Canada for a British port. No further trace, reported missing.
Oscar	Denmark	The schooner was wrecked near Lemvig. Her crew were rescued. She was on a voyage from Newcastle upon Tyne, Northumberland, United Kingdom to Kjerteminde.
Palmen	Norway	The brig ran aground at "Sondre Rose". She was refloated with assistance and taken in to Copenhagen, Denmark.
Royal Tar	United Kingdom	The ship arrived at Batavia, Netherlands East Indies on fire. She was on a voyage from Hamburg, Germany to Batavia.
Souvenir	Canada	The barque ran aground at Honfleur, Manche, France. She was on a voyage from Philadelphia, Pennsylvania, United States to Honfleur. She was refloated.
Souvenir	United States	The ship was wrecked on Langlade Island. She was on a voyage from New York to Saint John's, Newfoundland Colony.
Thomas	United Kingdom	The schooner was wrecked on the Mellumplatte, in the Jade Bight. Her crew were rescued. She was on a voyage from North Sunderland, Northumberland to Harburg, Germany.
Useful	United Kingdom	The tug collided with the tug Grappler (United Kingdom) and sank in the River Thames at Charlton, Kent. Her crew were rescued.
William	United Kingdom	The lighter sprang a leak and sank in the North Sea off Redcar, Yorkshire. Her crewman was rescued. She was being towed from Sunderland, County Durham to Scarborough, Yorkshire.
76	Russia	The lighter sank at Kronstadt.
Unnamed	United Kingdom	The schooner foundered in the North Sea.

== 5 November ==
List of shipwrecks: 5 November 1879
Ship	State	Description
Anna	Germany	The schooner ran aground off Dragør, Denmark. She was on a voyage from Libava, Courland Governorate to Bremen. She was refloated and taken in to Copenhagen, Denmark for repairs.
Annie	United Kingdom	The brig was driven ashore at Pudimadaka, India.
Antonio Mimbelli	Russia	The barque was driven ashore at "Fannons Point", Ottoman Empire. She was on a voyage from Marianople to Marseille, Bouches-du-Rhône.
County of Sutherland	United Kingdom	The steamship ran aground in the Clyde.
Enterprise	United Kingdom	The fishing trawler was severely damaged by fire.
Harald Haarfanger	Norway	The schooner ran aground at Troon, Ayrshire, United Kingdom. She was on a voyage from Irvine, Ayrshire to Bergen.
James Reid	United Kingdom	The schooner was driven ashore at Redcar, Yorkshire. She was on a voyage from Middlesbrough, Yorkshire to Briton Ferry, Glamorgan. She was refloated and towed in to Hartlepool, County Durham, where she sank.
Keil	Germany	The schooner ran aground at Stubben. She was refloated.
Kensington	United Kingdom	The steamship departed from Cardiff, Glamorgan for Havana, Cuba. No further trace, presumed foundered with the loss of all 40 crew.
Lolland	Denmark	The abandoned schooner was driven ashore and wrecked at Lemvig.
Nellie Brown	United States	The lumber schooner ran aground on Little Egg Harbor Bar. She developed a leak that her pumps could not keep up with and she was lost. Her six crewmen and one passenger were rescued by the United States Life Saving Service.
Ousel	United Kingdom	The steamship ran aground at Maassluis, South Holland. She was on a voyage from Liverpool, Lancashire to Rotterdam, South Holland. She was refloated and taken in to Rotterdam, where she was beached.
Storfursten	Russia	The ship was driven ashore at "Salvoref", Sweden. She was on a voyage from Turku, Grand Duchy of Finland to Tarragona, Spain.
Taufahau	New South Wales	The two-masted brigantine ran aground off Seal Rocks, New South Wales.
William	United Kingdom	The lighter sprang a leak and sank off Redcar, Yorkshire. The sole crew member on board was rescued. She was being towed from Sunderland, County Durham to Scarborough, Yorkshire.
Wodan	Germany	The barque struck the quayside at Grimsby, Lincolnshire, United Kingdom. She was on a voyage from Grimsby to Neufahrwasser. She was towed in to Grimsby for repairs.
481	Russia	The lighter sank at Kronstadt.

== 6 November ==
List of shipwrecks: 6 November 1879
Ship	State	Description
Den Norske Bonde	Norway	The brig was driven ashore and wrecked at Lemvig, Denmark. Her crew were rescued She was on a voyage from Newcastle upon Tyne, Northumberland, United Kingdom to Grimstad.
Enterprise	United Kingdom	The steam trawler was severely damaged by fire at Berwick upon Tweed, Northumberland.
Espeigle	France	The brig ran aground on the Goodwin Sands, Kent, United Kingdom. Her crew were rescued. She was on a voyage from Newcastle upon Tyne to Cannes, Alpes-Maritimes.
George	United Kingdom	The steam wherry was driven ashore at Amble, Northumberland. She was on a voyage from the River Tyne to Sunderland, County Durham.
Hartlepool	United Kingdom	The steamship was driven ashore on Saltholm, Denmark. She was on a voyage from Barrow-in-Furness, Lancashire to Kronstadt, Russia. She was refloated and taken in to Copenhagen, Denmark.
RMS Moravian	United Kingdom	The steamship ran aground in Lake Saint-Pierre. She was on a voyage from Montreal, Quebec, Canada to Liverpool, Lancashire.
Nanine Aglae	Spain	The ship sprang a leak and was beached in Angle Bay. She was on a voyage from Bilbao to Glasgow, Renfrewshire, United Kingdom.
Turenne	France	The steamship caught fire at Bordeaux, Gironde. The fire was extinguished.

== 7 November ==
List of shipwrecks: 7 November 1879
Ship	State	Description
Antona	United Kingdom	The steamship was driven ashore at Cape St. Paul, Greece. She had been refloated by 12 November with assistance from the tug Stefano (Greece).
Arizona	United Kingdom	Arizona's bow after the collision with the iceberg. The steamship collided with an iceberg in the Grand Banks of Newfoundland and was severely damaged at the bow. Arizona was on a voyage from New York, United States to Liverpool, Lancashire. She put in to Saint John's, Newfoundland Colony on 10 November.
Champion	United States	The paddle steamer was sunk in a collision with Lady Octavia (United Kingdom) off the Delaware Capes, Virginia with the loss of 30 lives. Champion was on a voyage from New York to Charleston, South Carolina.
Fjorde November	Norway	The ship ran aground on the Fahludd Reef, in the Baltic Sea. She was on a voyage from Vyborg, Grand Duchy of Finland to Antwerp, Belgium.
Kate Helena	United Kingdom	The ship was abandoned in the Pacific Ocean (55°30′S 75°50′W). Her crew were rescued by the barque Northam Castle (United Kingdom). She was on a voyage from Swansea, Glamorgan to Coquimbo, Chile. Kate Helena was subsequently driven ashore and wrecked at "Pillar".
John and Mary	United Kingdom	The fishing smack foundered off the Tuskar Rock with the loss of one of her three crew. Survivors were rescued by the schooner William (United Kingdom).
Kaisar-i Hind	United Kingdom	The steamship ran aground in Lake Timsah. She was on a voyage from Southampton, Hampshire to Bombay, British Raj. Kaisar-i Hind was refloated on 11 November and resumed her voyage.
Mittwoch	United Kingdom	The ship was driven ashore on Öland, Sweden. She was on a voyage from Svartvik, Sweden to an English port. She had been refloated by 13 November.
Red Star	United Kingdom	The steamship ran aground near the Blackrock Castle, County Cork.
Rocklight	United Kingdom	The ship departed from Philadelphia, Pennsylvania, United States for Bristol, Gloucestershire. No further trace, presumed foundered with the loss of all seventeen crew.
Willem Frederick	Netherlands	The ship was driven ashore on Samos, Greece.
577	Russia	The lighter sprang a leak and sank. She was being towed from Kronstadt to Saint Petersburg.
682	Russia	The lighter sank at Kronstadt. She was being towed from Saint Petersburg to Kronstadt.

== 8 November ==
List of shipwrecks: 8 November 1879
Ship	State	Description
Berwick	United Kingdom	The steam collier ran aground in the River Thames at Woolwich, Kent.
Castleton	United Kingdom	The steamship was driven ashore at Malta Her crew were rescued by a tug. She was on a voyage from Odesa, Russia to Havre de Grâce, Seine-Inférieure, France. She was refloated the next day and taken in to the Rinella Creek in a waterlogged condition. Her 40 crew were rescued by a tug. She was declared a total loss, but was refloated on 23 November and towed in to Valetta.
Falcon	United States	The steamship collided with another vessel and sank. All on board were rescued. She was on a voyage from Baltimore, Maryland to Charleston, South Carolina.
Kaisar-i Hind	United Kingdom	The steamship ran aground in Lake Timsah. She was on a voyage from London to Bombay, India. She was refloated on 11 November and resumed her voyage.
Maria	United Kingdom	The ship ran aground between the Barrel Rocks and Grassholm, Pembrokeshire. She was on a voyage from the Rio Grande to Runcorn, Cheshire. She was refloated and completed the voyage in a leaky condition.

== 9 November ==
List of shipwrecks: 9 November 1879
Ship	State	Description
Berwick	United Kingdom	The steam collier ran aground in the River Thames at Woolwich, Kent.
Holmside, and Sentinel	United Kingdom	The steamships collided at South Shields, County Durham. Holmside was on a voyage from South Shields to London. She was severely damaged at the bow and put back to South Shields. Sentinel was on a voyage from London to Newcastle upon Tyne, Northumberland. She ran aground near the Mussel Scarp, but was refloated and resumed her voyage.
Joe Riners	Germany	The schooner ran aground in the Seine. She was on a voyage from New York, United States to Rouen, Seine-Inférieure, France.
Roscommon	United Kingdom	The steamship capsized and sank with the loss of six of her 22 crew. She was on a voyage from Liverpool, Lancashire to Havana, Cuba. Survivors took to the boats; they were rescued the next day by the barque Svanen (Norway).
Unnamed	Italy	The ship ran aground in the Seine.

== 10 November ==
List of shipwrecks: 10 November 1879
Ship	State	Description
Albion	United Kingdom	The schooner ran aground on the Goodwin Sands, Kent. Her crew were rescued by the galley Henry Crassey (United Kingdom). She was refloated the next day with assistance from the tug Aid (United Kingdom), which towed her in to Ramsgate, Kent in a severely leaky condition.
Bokhara	Norway	The full-rigged ship collided with the steamship Milanese (United States) and sank in the English Channel off Dover, Kent, United Kingdom. Her crew were rescued by Milanese. Bokhara was on a voyage from Antwerp, Belgium to New York, United States.
St. Goran	Sweden	The brig was wrecked at Agger, Denmark. Her crew were rescued. She was on a voyage from Calais to Gothenburg.
Unnamed	flag unknown	The brigantine collided with a steamship and sank in the Dogger Bank. Her crew were rescued by the steamship.

== 11 November ==
List of shipwrecks: 11 November 1879
Ship	State	Description
Alpha	United Kingdom	The fishing boat departed from Lerwick, Shetland Islands for Barra, Outer Hebrides. No further trace, presumed foundered with the loss of all six crew.
Charger	United Kingdom	The barque was driven ashore in Ballyholme Bay. She was refloated on 14 November and towed in to Belfast, County Antrim.
Chrysolite	United Kingdom	The ship was wrecked on a reef off Tory Island, County Donegal.
Ecliptic	United Kingdom	The ship was wrecked at Sydney, Nova Scotia, Canada.
Germania	Germany	The ship departed from Cuxhaven for New York, United States. No further trace, reported missing.
Glasgow	United Kingdom	The steamship was driven ashore in the Nieuwe Waterweg. She was on a voyage from Rotterdam, South Holland to Glasgow, Renfrewshire. She was refloated and put back to Rotterdam in a leaky condition and was placed under repair.
Hannah and Joseph	United Kingdom	The ship was abandoned in the River Mersey off New Brighton, Cheshire. She was on a voyage from Garston, Lancashire to Caernarfon. She subsequently sank.
Helios	Sweden	The steamship ran aground at Hallands Väderö. She was on a voyageb from Málaga, Spain to Copenhagen, Denmark and Stockholm. She was refloated and taken in to Copenhagen in a severely leaky condition.
Marie	Germany	The schooner struck wreckage and foundered in the English Channel 10 nautical miles (19 km) south south west of Beachy Head, Sussex, United Kingdom. She was on a voyage from Sunderland, County Durham to Cowes, Isle of Wight, United Kingdom.
Marie Nathalie	Denmark	The brig collided with the steamship Cyprus (United Kingdom) and sank in the Dogger Bank with the loss of a crew member. Survivors were rescued by Cyprus. Marie Nathalie was on a voyage from Cardiff, Glamorgan, United Kingdom to Copenhagen.
Nora	United Kingdom	The steamship was wrecked off Goeree, Zeeland, Netherlands. Her crew were rescued. She was on a voyage from IJmuiden, North Holland, Netherlands to London.
Pallas	Netherlands	The steamship foundered in the North Sea with the loss of all 30 crew. She was on a voyage from Copenhagen, Denmark to Amsterdam, North Holland. Wreckage was up on the coast of North Holland on 17 and 18 November.
Strathbeg	United Kingdom	The steamship was driven ashore on "Onsay".

== 12 November ==
List of shipwrecks: 12 November 1879
Ship	State	Description
Alert	United Kingdom	The schooner was abandoned off Scarborough, Yorkshire. Her crew were rescued by the Scarborough Lifeboat Lady Leigh ( Royal National Lifeboat Institution). Alert was on a voyage from Scarborough to Hartlepool, County Durham. She was subsequently taken in to Scarborough with assistance from Lady Leigh and the tug Alexandria (United Kingdom).
Alert	United Kingdom	The fishing smack was driven ashore at Scarborough. Her three crew were rescued by the Scarborough Lifeboat Lady Leigh ( Royal National Lifeboat Institution). Alert was refloated with assistance from the tug Alexandria (United Kingdom), which towed her in to Scarborough.
Ann Shepherd	United Kingdom	The schooner was driven against the quayside and sank at Liverpool, Lancashire. Her crew survived. She was on a voyage from Aberdeen to Liverpool.
Celestial	United Kingdom	The Mersey Flat was driven onto the Dove Sandbank, in the River Mersey. She was refloated.
G. B. S.	United Kingdom	The barque capsized off Bridlington, Yorkshire. Two crew were washed off the wreck on 14 November. She was then run into by the steamship Joseph Rackett (United Kingdom) with the loss of another crew member. G. B. S. was towed in to Grimsby, Lincolnshire by Joseph Rackett.
Germine	United Kingdom	The lugger was run down and sunk in the North Sea 30 nautical miles (56 km) off Lowestoft, Suffolk by the full-rigged ship Marianne (Flag unknown). Her crew were rescued.
Harry Bailey	United Kingdom	The barque was driven ashore at Baltimore, Maryland, United States. She was on a voyage from Bordeaux, Gironde, France to Baltimore.
Helen and Jane	Victoria	The schooner ran aground at Te Waewae Bay, New Zealand, and became a wreck.
Kalodyne	United Kingdom	The schooner ran aground on the Hale Sand, in the North Sea off the coast of Lincolnshire and capsized. Her crew were rescued by Margaret and Maria (United Kingdom).
Madonna	United Kingdom	The brig was driven into a steamship and sank in the River Mersey. Her crew were rescued. She was beached at Tranmere, Cheshire in a waterlogged condition with assistance from the tug Mersey King (United Kingdom).
Mary Anna	United Kingdom	The schooner ran aground and capsized at Rye, Sussex.
Menai Packet	United Kingdom	The smack was driven ashore at Porthdinllaen, Caernarfonshire. She was on a voyage from Swansea, Glamorgan to Newry, County Antrim.
Puffer	United Kingdom	The dumb barge was run into by the steamship Lady Olive (United Kingdom) and sank in the River Thames.
Rapidan	United States	The steamship struck an obstruction and sank. Two lives lost.
Speculation	United Kingdom	The brig foundered in the North Sea (55°34′N 3°30′E). Her crew were rescued by Foster (United Kingdom). Speculation was on a voyage from King's Lynn, Norfolk to Copenhagen, Denmark.
Trio	United Kingdom	The schooner was driven ashore and wrecked at North Sunderland, Northumberland. Her crew survived. She was on a voyage from North Sunderland to Hull, Yorkshire.
Unnamed	United Kingdom	The schooner sank at Liverpool.

== 13 November ==
List of shipwrecks: 13 November 1879
Ship	State	Description
Alliance	United Kingdom	The schooner was driven ashore in the Scheldt at Antwerp, Belgium. She was on a voyage from Antwerp to Teignmouth, Devon. She was refloated and put back to Antwerp.
Ann	United Kingdom	The Thames barge was run into by the steamship Hawk (United Kingdom) and sank in the River Thames at Cuckold's Point, Surrey. Her crew were rescued.
Ann and Willmott	United Kingdom	The smack ran aground on Scroby Sands, Norfolk and was wrecked. Her crew were rescued by the Gorleston Lifeboat.
Bay Queen	United States	The schooner, abandoned by her crew at an unknown time, drifted ashore at Rockport, Massachusetts and broke up, a total wreck.
Lebanon	United Kingdom	The brig was driven ashore and wrecked on Læsø, Denmark. Her crew were rescued. She was on a voyage from Helsingborg, Sweden to Penarth, Glamorgan.
Prinds Karl	Norway	The ship was run into by a steamship off the Galloper Sand and was abandoned. Her crew were rescued by the smack William and Henry (United Kingdom). Prinds Karl was on a voyage from Bristol, Gloucestershire, United Kingdom to Laurvig.
Scarborough King	United Kingdom	The smack was swamped in a heavy sea and sank in the North Sea 40 nautical miles (74 km) off Flamborough Head, Yorkshire with the loss of the skipper and all four crew. Wreckage subsequently came ashore at Sandlemere, Yorkshire.

== 14 November ==
List of shipwrecks: 14 November 1879
Ship	State	Description
Breed	United States	The ship foundered in Lake Erie with the loss of seven of the eight people on board.
Desire	France	The brig was driven ashore at Dunkirk, Nord. She was on a voyage from Marseille, Bouches-du-Rhône to Dunkirk.
Empress	Germany	The barque departed from Philadelphia, Pennsylvania, United States for Newcastle upon Tyne, Northumberland, United Kingdom. No further trace, presumed foundered with the loss of all eleven crew.
H. F. Ulrichs	Germany	The steamship was driven ashore on Terschelling, Friesland, Netherlands. She was on a voyage from Kronstadt, Russia to Rotterdam, South Holland, Netherlands.
Hindostan	United Kingdom	The steamship was wrecked near Madras, India. She was on a voyage from London to Calcutta, India.
Josephine	United Kingdom	The brig was driven ashore at Dunkirk. She was on a voyage from London to Hartlepool, County Durham.
Liberty	Gold Coast	The schooner was wrecked at "Adjudah", Africa.
Mary Anne	United Kingdom	The barque sprang a leak off the Saint Tudwal's Islands, Caernarfonshire. She was on a voyage from Ardrossan and/or Troon, Ayrshire to Boston, Massachusetts, United States. She came ashore at Abersoch, Caernarfonshire the next day.
Royal Tar	United Kingdom	The smack was destroyed by fire at Lerwick, Shetland Islands.
Unnamed	United Kingdom	The fishing smack was wrecked on the Scroby Sands, Norfolk with the loss of all hands.
Unnamed	Flag unknown	The barque sank in the North Sea off the Newarp Lightship ( Trinity House).
Unnamed	France	The schooner was driven ashore at Calais with the loss of all hands.

== 15 November ==
List of shipwrecks: 15 November 1879
Ship	State	Description
Braemar Castle	United Kingdom	The ship was damaged by fire at Singapore, Straits Settlements. She was on a voyage from Amoy, China to New York, United States.
Chevington	United Kingdom	The steamship collided with Doune Castle (United Kingdom) at Liverpool, Lancashire. Chevington was on a voyage from Le Tréport, Seine-Inférieure, France to Liverpool. She was refloated the next daya and taken in to Liverpool in a waterlogged condition.
Dolt	United Kingdom	The ship ran aground on the Horse Bank, in the Irish Sea off the coast of Lancashire. She was refloated.
Hampton	United Kingdom	The wherry was run down and sunk by the steamship Lovaine (United Kingdom) at North Shields, Northumberland. Both crew survived.
Isabella	United Kingdom	The schooner was driven ashore at Whitby, Yorkshire. She was on a voyage from South Shields, County Durham to Langstone, Hampshire. She was refloated with assistance the next day and taken in to Whitby in a leaky condition.
Maria	United Kingdom	The schooner was driven ashore at Whitby. She was refloated and taken in to Whitby.
Suzanne	United Kingdom	The full-rigged ship was driven ashore near Grimsby, Lincolnshire. She was refloated and put back to Hull in a leaky condition.
Venerata	United Kingdom	The barque was abandoned off the coast of Portugal after springing a leak on 5 November following a south-east gale three days earlier. Fifty tons of pig iron was thrown overboard in an attempt to stay afloat and the crew abandoned ship when Vega (Norway) was nearby. Venerata was on a voyage from Newcastle upon Tyne, Northumberland to New York, United States.
Warren Hastings	United Kingdom	The barque capsized in the Atlantic Ocean with the loss of two of her crew. Survivors were taken off the wreck on 18 November by Tollington ( Canada). Warren Hastings was on a voyage from Lisbon, Portugal to the Delaware River.
Unnamed	Germany	The pilot boat capsized at Cuxhaven with the loss of seven lives.

== 16 November ==
List of shipwrecks: 16 November 1879
Ship	State	Description
A. M. Lotinga	United States	The ship capsized at Dunkirk, Nord, France.
Andreas	Germany	The ship was driven ashore and wrecked on Ameland, Friesland, Netherlands.
Cecilia	(United Kingdom of Great Britain and Ireland) Jersey	The ketch ran aground on the Goodwin Sands, Kent. Her crew were rescued by a smack. She was on a voyage from London to Lorient, Morbihan, France. Cecilia was refloated and taken in to Dover, Kent.
Hattie Howard	United States	The lumber schooner broached going into harbor at Oswego, New York, in Lake Ontario and was driven ashore 150 feet (46 m) from the lighthouse and broke up, a total wreck. Her seven crewmen rescued by the United States Life Saving Service.
Prince	United Kingdom	The sloop was driven ashore at Wells-next-the-Sea, Norfolk. She was on a voyage from Goole, Yorkshire to Woodbridge, Suffolk. She was refloated the next day with the assistance of a tug and was towed in to Wells-next-the-Sea.
Queen Adelaide	United Kingdom	The ketch foundered 22 nautical miles (41 km) north west of Guernsey, Channel Islands. Her four crew survived. She was on a voyage from Guernsey to Weymouth, Dorset.
Tropic	Sweden	The barque was run into by the steamship Douglas (United Kingdom) in the River Thames and was severely damaged.
Whitwood	United Kingdom	The steamship ran aground and was severely damaged. She was on a voyage from Goole, Yorkshire to Rouen, Seine-Inférieure, France. She was refloated and put back to Goole.
Unnamed	France	The lighter was swamped at Dunkirk by the capsizing of A. M. Lotinga (United States).
Unnamed	United Kingdom	The schooner was driven ashore and wrecked at Newcastle upon Tyne, Northumberland with the loss of all four crew.

== 17 November ==
List of shipwrecks: 17 November 1879
Ship	State	Description
Algie O. Thayer	United States	The steamship was wrecked in a violent storm.
Annie	Denmark	The schooner was driven ashore. She was on a voyage from Pernau, Germany to Schiedam, South Holland, Netherlands. She was refloated with assistance.
Ariel	United Kingdom	The schooner ran aground on the Haisborough Sands, in the North Sea off the coast of Norfolk. She was on a voyage from Liverpool, Lancashire to Newcastle upon Tyne, Northumberland. She was refloated with the assistance of a tug and taken in to Great Yarmouth, Norfolk in a leaky condition.
Billy Simpson	United Kingdom	The barque was driven into the hulk Continental ( (United Kingdom of Great Britain and Ireland) Gibraltar) at Gibraltar.
Carl	Germany	The schooner was driven ashore near Swinemünde. She was on a voyage from Bremen to Rye, Sussex, United Kingdom.
Catherina	United Kingdom	The schooner was abandoned 40 nautical miles (74 km) east of the Leman Sand. Her crew were rescued. She was on a voyage from Fécamp, Seine-Inférieure to Leith, Lothian.
Charles M. Ritter	United States	The steamship was wrecked in a violent storm.
Clarence	United Kingdom	The steamship ran aground near the Twin Islands. She was on a voyage from Belfast, County Antrim to Workington, Cumberland.
George D. Seymore	United States	The steamship was wrecked in a violent storm.
Gemini	United Kingdom	The ship was run into off Ramsgate, Kent and was damaged. She was towed in to Ramsgate by the smack Henry Florence (United Kingdom).
Guiding Star	United Kingdom	The schooner was driven ashore and damaged at Helmsdale, Sutherland.
Jane and Ellen	United Kingdom	The ship struck a rock in the Menai Strait and was beached. She was on a voyage from Llanaelhaearn, Caernarfonshire to Liverpool, Lancashire.
John Heckler	United States	The steamship was wrecked in a violent storm.
John T. Berry	United States	The ship ran aground in the River Thames. She was on a voyage from New York to London, United Kingdom.
Mettina	United Kingdom	The schooner foundered in the North Sea. Her crew survived. She was on a voyage from London, United Kingdom to Emden.
Philip Becker	United States	The steamship was wrecked in a violent storm.
Sasco	United States	The schooner was trying to enter the harbor at Fairport, Ohio, in Lake Erie in a gale with rain and sleet, but missed and was driven ashore one-half mile (0.80 km) from Life Saving Station No. 7, 9th District and was lost. Her six crewmen rescued by the United States Life Saving Service.
Tribe Den	Germany	The barque was wrecked in the Firth of Forth. Her crew were rescued.
Wild Dayrell	United Kingdom	The barque was driven ashore in the Battman Gulf. She was on a voyage from Söderhamn, Sweden to Shoreham-by-Sea, Sussex. She was refloated and taken in to "Baste" in a leaky condition.
Yembo	United Kingdom	The steamship was wrecked on Hogland, Russia. She was on a voyage from Kronstadt, Russia to London.
Several unnamed vessels	United States	The barges sank in Lake Ontario with the loss of 31 lives.

== 18 November ==
List of shipwrecks: 18 November 1879
Ship	State	Description
Amalia	Trieste	The barque ran aground near Glasson Dock, Lancashire, United Kingdom and was wrecked. Her crew were rescued. She was on a voyage from New York, United States to Glasson Dock.
Anna Pizzorno	Italy	The ship struck the Tuskar Rock. She was on a voyage from Quebec City, Canada to Liverpool, Lancashire. She completed her voyage in a waterlogged condition.
Black Diamond	United Kingdom	The steamship ran aground off the Twin Islands. She was refloated and taken in to Belfast, County Antrim.
Cornelia	Netherlands	The kuff was driven ashore and wrecked at Kijkduin, South Holland. She was on a voyage from Newcastle upon Tyne, Northumberland, United Kingdom to Harlingen, Friesland.
Duguy	France	The ship ran aground and was wrecked at Les Sables d'Olonne, Vendée. She was on a voyage from New York, United States to Les Sables d'Olonne.
Galvanic	United Kingdom	The steamship ran aground off the Twin Islands. She was on a voyage from Liverpool to Belfast. She was refloated and taken in to Belfast.
Greyhound	United States	The schooner ran aground on Plum Island with in sight of Life Saving Station No. 1, 2nd District. In the early evening a gale sprung up causing her to float off and sink in deep water, a total lost. Her eight crewmen made it to shore on their own.
Llama	United Kingdom	The steamship ran aground off the Twin Islands. Her passengers were taken off by a tug. She was on a voyage from Glasgow, Renfrewshire to Belfast.
Louise	Russia	The schooner ran aground. She was refloated and taken in to Copenhagen, Denmark.
Neva	United Kingdom	The steamship ran aground on Saltholm, Denmark. She was on a voyage from South Shields, County Durham to Riga, Russian Empire. She was refloated on 20 November.
Phœnix	Denmark	The brig was driven ashore and wrecked at the north point of Öland, Sweden.
Reine Leonie	United Kingdom	The lugger was wrecked at Hartland Point, Devon, United Kingdom. Her crew were rescued. She was on a voyage from Vannes, Morbihan to Swansea, Glamorgan, United Kingdom.
Sirene	Russia	The schooner was towed in to Karlskrona, Sweden in a sinking condition by the steamship Carlshamn (Sweden). Sirene was on a voyage from Vyborg, Grand Duchy of Finland to Roskilde, Denmark.
St. Jean	France	The schooner capsized at Dunkirk, Nord.
South Western	United Kingdom	The steamship ran aground off the Twin Islands. She was on a voyage from Ardrossan, Ayrshire to Belfast.
Warren Hastings	United Kingdom	The barque left Lisbon for the Delaware River in ballast on 6 November, and during a heavy gale on 15 November was hit by large waves which took away the wheel-house. On 18 November Tollington ( Canada) rescued the crew and transferred them to Mabel (Flag unknown), and the crew were finally landed at Falmouth, Cornwall, England.

== 19 November ==
List of shipwrecks: 19 November 1879
Ship	State	Description
Acacia	United Kingdom	The brigantine was driven ashore and wrecked on Arranmore, County Donegal. Her crew were rescued.
Alverston	United Kingdom	The steamship ran aground on the Banjaard Sand, in the North Sea off the coast of Zeeland, Netherlands. She was pn a voyage from Kronstadt, Russia to Rotterdam, South Holland, Netherlands.
Amalie	Norway	The ship struck the pier at Kincardine, Fife, United Kingdom. She was on a voyage from Porsgrund to Alloa, Clackmannanshire United Kingdom. She was taken in to Alloa in a waterlogged condition.
Bride	United Kingdom	The steamship was severely damaged by fire at Hull, Yorkshire.
C. O. D.	United States	The barge went ashore 200 feet (61 m) from Margaret Dall (United States), at the same time, north of the North Pier at Grand Haven, Michigan in a heavy storm on Lake Michigan after losing her tow. Her crewmen stayed on board.
C. Rich	United States	The scow was wrecked in a gale and severe snowstorm after parting her anchor chains in Lake Erie. Her three crewmen were rescued by Life Saving Station No. 9, 9th District, United States Life Saving Service.
Cleveland	United Kingdom	The barque ran aground at Batavia, Netherlands East Indies. She was on a voyage from Tegal, Netherlands East Indies to the English Channel. She was refloated.
E. J. Harland	United Kingdom	The full-rigged ship collided with the steamship Lake Champlain (United Kingdom) and sank in the Atlantic Ocean 360 nautical miles (670 km) off the coast of Ireland. Her crew were rescued by Lake Champlain. E. J. Harland was on a voyage from Ardrossan, Ayrshire to New York, United States.
Emerald	United Kingdom	The schooner collided with the steamship Blue Cross (United Kingdom) and sank off South Shields, County Durham with the loss of three of her seven crew. She was on a voyage from Gravesend, Kent to South Shields.
General H. E. Payne	United States	After the other disasters the tug struck the bar at Grand Haven, Michigan, sprung a leak, and then hit the end of the North Pier in a heavy storm on Lake Michigan and sank immediately. She broke up in 30 minutes, a total loss. Her 13 crewmen and 2 passengers were rescued by the United States Life Saving Service.
J. A. Holmes	United States	The schooner struck Maple Leaf (United States) near sunken cribs of the North Pier at Grand Haven, Michigan in a heavy storm on Lake Michigan and started to go to pieces, she was scuttled to prevent further damage. Her six crewmen were rescued by the United States Life Saving Service.
J. A. Saunders	United States	The scow was driven ashore in a gale and severe snowstorm in Lake Erie near where C. Rich and New Hampshire had gone ashore. Later refloated. Her four crewmen were rescued by Life Saving Station No. 9, 9th District, United States Life Saving Service.
James and Ellis, and North Wales	United Kingdom	The smack James and Ellis collided with the steamship North Wales and sank off Flamborough Head, Yorkshire. Her crew were rescued by North Wales, which was severely damaged.
John P. Clark	United States	The tug sank in a gale. One woman died.
King Arthur	United Kingdom	The steamship ran aground in the Sea of Marmara 20 nautical miles (37 km) off Gallipoli, Ottoman Empire. She was on a voyage from Nicholaieff, Russia to Malta.
Maple Leaf	United States	The lumber schooner struck sunken cribs of the North Pier at Grand Haven, Michigan in a heavy storm on Lake Michigan and partially filled with water. Her four crewmen were rescued by the United States Life Saving Service. Three hours later she was struck by J. A. Holmes (United States) cutting her almost in two, and broke up, a total wreck.
Margaret Dall	United States	The schooner went ashore 200 yards (180 m) north of the North Pier at Grand Haven, Michigan in a heavy storm on Lake Michigan an hour after J. A. Holmes stranded, she was immediately scuttled to prevent further damage. Her seven crewmen were rescued by the United States Life Saving Service.
Marie	United Kingdom	The full-rigged ship was abandoned off Cape Horn, Chile. Her crew were rescued by Helicon (United States). Marie was on a voyage from Cardiff, Glamorgan to Panama City, United States of Colombia.
Mystic	United States	The schooner stranded near the harbor mouth at Grand Haven, Michigan in a heavy storm on Lake Michigan. Her three crewmen made it to shore on their own. On 10 December she was washed off the beach in a storm out to the bar where she started pounding heavily and was scuttled to prevent further damage. Her three crewmen were rescued by the United States Life Saving Service
New Hampshire	United States	The schooner was driven ashore and wrecked in a gale and severe snowstorm on Lake Erie near where C. Rich had gone ashore. Her four crewmen were rescued by Life Saving Station No. 9, 9th District, United States Life Saving Service.
Nith	United Kingdom	The steamship ran ashore on Ailsa Craig. She was on a voyage from Larne, County Antrim to Ayr.
Ostsee	Germany	The steamship was driven ashore near Viimsi, Russia. She was on a voyage from Lübeck to Kronstadt, Russia.
Shepherd	United Kingdom	The schooner was wrecked on the Longsand, in the North Sea off the coast of Essex. Her three crew survived. She was on a voyage from Thurlestone, Devon to Sandwich, Kent.
Sumatra	United States	The schooner was wrecked after parting her anchor chains in a gale in Lake Erie and struck the old Lake Shore Depot near Life Saving Station No. 8, 9th District knocking down part of the pier. Her seven crewmen were rescued by the United States Life Saving Service.
Vestus	United Kingdom	The ship ran aground on the Burbo Bank, in Liverpool Bay. She was on a voyage from Galway to Liverpool, Lancashire. She was refloated and resumed her voyage.
Visitation	France	The ship ran aground on the Longsand, in the North Sea off the coast of Essex, United Kingdom. She was on a voyage from Gothenburg, Sweden to Saint-Malo, Ille-et-Vilaine. She was refloated and taken in to Dover, Kent in a leaky condition.
W. B. Phelps	United States	The schooner was wrecked in a gale and severe snowstorm one mile (1.6 km) east of Glen Arbor, Michigan and went to pieces. Five crewmen died, two crewmen were rescued by townspeople.
Zanetta	United Kingdom	The steamship was driven ashore at Faro Point, Sicily, Italy. She was refloated and sailed for Brindisi, Italy.
Unnamed	United Kingdom	The schooner was driven ashore in Loch Indaal. She was on a voyage from Ardrossan, Ayrshire to Galway.

== 20 November ==
List of shipwrecks: 20 November 1879
Ship	State	Description
Ada J. Bonner	United States	The barque ran aground and was damaged at Aspinwall, United States of Colombia.
Adele McLoon	United States	The ship was beached at Aspinwall and was severely damaged.
Albatross	Norway	The barque was wrecked at Aspinwall. Her crew were rescued.
Athena	Greece	The brig was abandoned in the Atlantic Ocean. Her crew were rescued by the barque Concettina (Italy). Athena was on a voyage from Sierra Leone to Marseille, Bouches-du-Rhône, France.
Bertha	Germany	The schooner was driven ashore at Withernsea, Yorkshire, United Kingdom. Her crew were rescued by rocket apparatus.
Chowdean	United Kingdom	The barque foundered off Cape Finisterre, Spain with the loss of two of her crew. Survivors were rescued by the barque Regina (Russia). Chowdean was on a voyage from Villareal, Spain to Newcastle upon Tyne, Northumberland.
Despatch No. 2	United Kingdom	The steam trawler collided with the steamship J. M. Lennard and sank off Seaham, County Durham with the loss of her captain. Survivors were rescued by J. M. Lennard.
E. H. Rich	United States	The brig was driven ashore and wrecked at Aspinwall. Her crew survived.
Ernst	Sweden	The ship departed from Halmstad for London, United Kingdom. No further trace, reported overdue.
Georgine	France	The barque was wrecked at Aspinwall. Her crew were rescued.
Henrys	United Kingdom	The fishing boat was driven ashore at Lowestoft, Suffolk. Her crew were rescued.
Jessie Stephenson	France	The ship departed from Philippeville, Algeria for Leith, Lothian, United Kingdom. No further trace, reported missing.
Lady	United Kingdom	The schooner was driven ashore and sank at Skutskär, Sweden.
Little	United Kingdom	The schooner was driven ashore and wrecked at Sunderland, County Durham.
Margaret Smith	United Kingdom	The barque was driven ashore and wrecked at Cannoniers Point, Mauritius. She was on a voyage from Greenock, Renfrewshire to Mauritius.
Mercury	United States	The lumber schooner was wrecked in a gale and severe snowstorm two miles (3.2 km) south of Pentwater, Michigan and went to pieces. Her eight crewmen were rescued by the United States Life Saving Service. An earlier rescue attempt by citizens resulted in one of the rescuers drowning.
Moidart	United Kingdom	The steamship ran aground on the Foulness Shoal off the east coast of Norfolk. She was on a voyage from the River Tyne to Odesa, Russia. She was refloated and taken in tow for Grimsby, Lincolnshire. Subsequently taken in to Hull, Yorkshire for repairs.
Two unnamed vessels	United States	The brigs were wrecked at Aspinwall.

== 21 November ==
List of shipwrecks: 21 November 1879
Ship	State	Description
Editha	United Kingdom	The barque foundered in the Atlantic Ocean. Her thirteen crew took to two boats. Eight of them in one of the boats were rescued a week later by the steamship Atlas (United Kingdom). Five crew in the other boat were rescued by another vessel. Editha was on a voyage from Philadelphia, Pennsylvania, United States to Queenstown, County Cork.
Fonix	Denmark	The brig was abandoned in the Baltic Sea off Öland, Sweden. Her crew were rescued by a Swedish barque. She was on a voyage from Skellefteå, Sweden to Grimsby, Lincolnshire, United Kingdom.
Gustave Charlotte	France	The ship departed from Newport, Monmouthshire, United Kingdom for Aber Wrac'h, Finistère. No further trace, reported severely overdue.
Hector	United States	The schooner was wrecked on Jones Inlet bar, Long Island, and was stripped and abandoned.
Italia	United Kingdom	The steamship ran aground in the Clyde. She was refloated the next day.
Jane and Mary	United Kingdom	The ship was wrecked at Llandulas, Anglesey. Her crew were rescued.

== 22 November ==
List of shipwrecks: 22 November 1879
Ship	State	Description
Albert Victor	United Kingdom	The ship was sighted in the Indian Ocean whilst on a voyage from Java, Netherlands East Indies to Greenock, Renfrewshire. No further trace, presumed foundered with the loss of all 25 crew.
City of Brussels	United Kingdom	The steamship collided with the steamship Rio Tejo (Spain) and sank in the Scheldt at Hoedekenskerke, Zeeland, Netherlands. City of Brussels was on a voyage from Antwerp, Belgium to London.
Cygne	France	The brig was abandoned in the Atlantic Ocean. Her ten crew were rescued by the steamship Illyrian (United Kingdom). Cygne was on a voyage from Martinique to Saint-Pierre, Saint Pierre and Miquelon.
John Watson	United Kingdom	The 200-ton three-masted schooner was holed on a reef off New Zealand's South Canterbury coast. The crew were rescued by the schooner Saxon before John Watson sank.
O. S. Bailey	United States	The schooner was abandoned at sea on passage from Dominica for Boston. Crew saved.
Phoebe	United Kingdom	The ship broke from her moorings and was scuttled at Belfast, County Antrim.
Thorn	United Kingdom	The barge foundered at Spithead, Hampshire. Her crew were rescued. She was on a voyage from Paulsgrove, Hampshire to Brading, Isle of Wight.
Waubuno	Canada	The paddle steamer foundered off Christian Island, Lake Huron, with the loss of all 24 people on board.
Xenia	United Kingdom	The ship was wrecked at Foulpoint, Aden Protectorate. All on board were rescued. She was on a voyage from London to Madagascar.

== 23 November ==
List of shipwrecks: 23 November 1879
Ship	State	Description
Carlingford	United States	The lumber schooner was wrecked on Horse-Shoe Reef off Buffalo, New York in a snowstorm with heavy seas. Her nine crew was rescued by the United States Life Saving Service.
Fair Head	United Kingdom	The steamship ran aground off Riga, Russia. She was on a voyage from Riga to Belfast, County Antrim. She was refloated and resumed her voyage.
India	United States	The barque was driven ashore at Kingsdown, Kent, United Kingdom. She was on a voyage from Hamburg, Germany to New York. She was refloated on 25 November.
Kurrachee	United Kingdom	The ship was abandoned in the Atlantic Ocean. Her crew were rescued by Semiroll (United States).
Magic	United Kingdom	The ship departed from Newport, Monmouthshire for Lisbon, Portugal. No further trace, reported overdue.
Sir Bevis	United Kingdom	The steamship was driven ashore at "Bulgale Dere", Ottoman Empire. She was on a voyage from Malta to Constantinople, Ottoman Empire. She was refloated the next day with assistance.
Venezia	Regia Marina	The ironclad ran aground off Zakynthos, Greece.
Virago	Sweden	The brig was driven ashore at Kalmar. She was on a voyage from Malmö to Kalmar.
Zeeland	Belgium	The steamship ran aground in the Schuylkill River. She was refloated with assistance and resumed her voyage.
Unnamed	Netherlands	The ship sank in the Baltic Sea off Brunshaupten, Germany. Her 30 crew were rescued by a steamship.

== 24 November ==
List of shipwrecks: 24 November 1879
Ship	State	Description
Baccino Revello	Italy	The barque was driven ashore on Terschelling, Friesland, Netherlands. She was on a voyage from New York to Altona, Germany. She was refloated.
Catherine McIver	United Kingdom	The ship ran aground on the Kimmeridge Ledge, in the English Channel off the coast of Dorset and was wrecked.
City of New York	United States	The ship's prop struck the bar entering the harbor at Ludington, Michigan causing damage that sank her eight feet (2.4 m) off the pier. Later raised. The 21 people on board made it to the pier.
Condor	United States	The brig collided with the steamship Ping-on (United States) and sank at Wusong (Woosung), China. Condor was on a voyage from Nagasaki, Japan to Wusong.
Curlew	United States	The schooner was wrecked four miles (6.4 km) north of Life Saving Station No. 5, 10th District on the Michigan coast of Lake Huron in strong wind with heavy seas. Her five crewmen were rescued by the United States Life Saving Service.
Ida	Netherlands	The ship was towed in to Terschelling, Friesland in a waterlogged condition.
Jason	Norway	The barque was driven ashore on "Log Island", 1 1/2 nautical miles (2.8 km) south east of Life Saving Station No. 9, 5th District on the Virginia coast of the Atlantic Ocean. Despite efforts of a wrecking company to refloat her, she broke in two on 2 January 1880, and was abandoned, a total loss.
Mathilda and Mary	United Kingdom	The smack was abandoned in the North Sea 3 nautical miles (5.6 km) east north east of the Leman Lightship ( Trinity House). Her crew were rescued. She was subsequently discovered by the dandy Lincoln (United Kingdom) and taken in to Great Yarmouth, Norfolk.
Ocean Queen	United Kingdom	The ship was driven ashore near Abersoch, Caernarfonshire. She was on a voyage from Runcorn, Cheshire to Dublin.
Olivo	Austria-Hungary	The barque was battered by a week long storm near the Azores and was in sinking condition when she was discovered by USS Constellation (United States Navy). Constellation's boat rescued her crew and the vessel was scuttled by burning as she was a hazard to navigation in her waterlogged condition. The ensign in charge of the boat was awarded the United States Life Saving Service's Gold Life Saving Medal, a medal from the Massachusetts Humane Society, and the New York Life Saving Benevolent Association. Olivo was on a voyage from New York, United States to Gibraltar.
Vivid	United Kingdom	The ship ran aground at Sunderland, County Durham. She was on a voyage from the Nieuwe Diep to Sunderland.

== 25 November ==
List of shipwrecks: 25 November 1879
Ship	State	Description
Anita	Spain	The brigantine was driven ashore and wrecked at Santa Cruz de Tenerife, Tenerife, Canary Islands. Her crew were rescued.
Ardy	Denmark	The schooner was driven ashore. She was on a voyage from Kjerteminde to London, United Kingdom. She was refloated and towed in to Harwich, Essex, United Kingdom in a leaky condition.
Arracan	Germany	The barque collided with the barque Matura at Galveston, Texas, United States. She was consequently condemned, but was subsequently repaired and returned to service under the American flag as Brenham.
Aurora	Spain	The schooner foundered 90 nautical miles (170 km) off the Mosquito Coast.
Euxine	France	The steamship ran aground at Marseille, Bouches-du-Rhône. She was on a voyage from Alexandria, Egypt to Marseille. She was refloated with assistance.
Favorit	Norway	The schooner departed from Helsinki, Grand Duchy of Finland for an English port. Subsequently foundered in the North Sea with the loss of all hands. Wreckage washed up on Föhr, Germany in February 1880.
Frederick Stang	Norway	The ship ran aground on the Owers Shoal. She was on a voyage from New York, United States to King's Lynn, Norfolk, United Kingdom. She was refloated and resumed her voyage.
Hwai-Yuen	China	The steamship collided with the steamship Hangwang (China) and sank at Shanghai. She was refloated in January 1880.
Jane Miller	Canada	The steamship foundered off Big Bay, Michigan, United States with the loss of all 28 people on board.
Lizzie	United Kingdom	The ship departed from Runcorn, Cheshire for Plymouth, Devon. No further trace.
Lufra	United Kingdom	The steamship foundered in the Bay of Biscay. Her 21 crew were rescued by the barque Gratitude (United Kingdom). Lufra was on a voyage from the River Tyne to Genoa, Italy.
Mino	United Kingdom	The steamship departed from Liverpool, Lancashire for Las Palmas de Gran Canaria, Canary Islands. No further trace, posted missing.
Osprey	Norway	The barque ran aground on the Goodwin Sands, Kent, United Kingdom. She was refloated with the assistance of two tugs and taken in to The Downs.
Patience	United Kingdom	The Yorkshire Billyboy ran aground on the Blake Sand. She was refloated and beached at Grimsby, Lincolnshire.
Proven	Norway	The barque was driven ashore at Honfleur, Manche, France. She was on a voyage from Havre de Grâce, Seine-Inférieure, France to Dram. She was refloated and towed in to Havre de Grâce in a severely leaky condition.
Pergala	United Kingdom	The steamship ran aground at "Raz Shankhair", Egypt.
Solon	United Kingdom	The ship ran aground at Grimsby, Lincolnshire. She was on a voyage from Nederkalix, Sweden to Grimsby.
Thomas	United Kingdom	The ship collided with the ketch William Varney (United Kingdom) and was beached at Lowestoft, Suffolk.

== 26 November ==
List of shipwrecks: 26 November 1879
Ship	State	Description
Fitzroy	United Kingdom	The steamship collided with the steamship Mercutio (Germany) and sank in the River Thames at East Greenwich, Middlesex. Fitzroy was on a voyage from Montreal, Quebec, Canada to London. She was refloated the next day and beached at Millwall, Middlesex.
Freedom	United States	The ship ran aground in the Swash Channel. She was on a voyage from Yloilo, Spanish East Indies to New York. She was refloated.
Hathersage	United Kingdom	The steamship ran aground at the mouth of the River Tees and was damaged. She was refloated and resumed her voyage, but put in to Grimsby, Lincolnshire.
Monitor	Sweden	The barque was driven ashore at Dunkirk, Nord, France and sank. She was on a voyage from Gävle, Sweden to Port-Vendres, Pyrénées-Orientales, France. She was refloated with the assistance of two tugs and taken in to Dunkirk.
Patria	Germany	The schooner ran aground on the Leman Sand, Her crew were rescued by the smack Telegram (United Kingdom).
HMS Southampton	Royal Navy	The training ship was set afire at Hull, Yorkshire. The fire was extinguished.

== 27 November ==
List of shipwrecks: 27 November 1879
Ship	State	Description
Cossack	United Kingdom	The steamship ran aground at Königsberg, Germany.
Devonshire	United Kingdom	The brigantine capsized in the Atlantic Ocean 120 nautical miles (220 km) south west of Cape Finisterre, Spain. Her crew were rescued by Ontario (United Kingdom). Devonshire was on a voyage from Swansea, Glamorgan to Lisbon, Portugal.
Polymnia	Norway	The ship ran aground at Königsberg. She was on a voyage from Königsberg to Campbeltown, Argyllshire, United Kingdom
Prince Arthur	United Kingdom	The smack sprang a leak and was abandoned in the North Sea. Her crew were rescued by the schooner Ocean (United Kingdom). Prince Arthur was on a voyage from the River Tyne to Hull, Yorkshire.
Theodore H. Allen	United States	The full-rigged ship was abandoned in the Atlantic Ocean. Her crew were rescued by the full-rigged ship Macduff (United Kingdom). Theodore H. Allen was on a voyage from New York to San Francisco, California.

== 28 November ==
List of shipwrecks: 28 November 1879
Ship	State	Description
Chawdean	United Kingdom	The barque was abandoned in the Atlantic Ocean. Her crew were rescued by the barque Regina (Russia).
Dawdon	United Kingdom	The steamship ran aground at Sunderland, County Durham. She was on a voyage from London to Sunderland.
Elina	Italy	The barque ran aground and sank at Calais, France. She was on a voyage from Philadelphia, Pennsylvania, United States to Calais.
Jane	United Kingdom	The schooner collided with the steamship RMS Moravian (United Kingdom) and was severely at the entrance to Lough Foyle.
Tiara	United Kingdom	The steamship was wrecked at Cape Finisterre, Spain. Her 26 crew were rescued by Hipparchus (United Kingdom). Tiara was on a voyage from Alexandria, Egypt to Hull, Yorkshire.
Union	United Kingdom	The ship departed from Burntisland, Fife for Bremerhaven, Germany. No further trace, reported severely overdue.

== 29 November ==
List of shipwrecks: 29 November 1879
Ship	State	Description
Athina	Greece	The brig was abandoned at sea. Her crew were rescued by the barque Concettina (Italy). Athina was on a voyage from Sierra Leone to Marseille, Bouches-du-Rhône, France.
Dryden	United Kingdom	The barque sprang a leak and foundered off Cape Finisterre, Spain with the loss of two of her crew. Survivors were rescued by the barque Regina (Russia). Dryden was on a voyage from Villareal, Spain to Sunderland, County Durham.
Emblehope	United Kingdom	The steamship foundered in the Bay of Biscay 100 nautical miles (190 km) off Cape Finisterre, Spain. Her eighteen crew were rescued by the steamship Zaripha (United Kingdom). Emblehope was on a voyage from Sulina, United Principalities to Antwerp, Belgium.
Idea	United Kingdom	The ship foundered in the Chops of the Channel. Her crew were rescued by the barque Veritas (United Kingdom). Idea was on a voyage from Plymouth, Devon to Gijón, Spain.
Isabella Ann	United Kingdom	The ship was abandoned 5 nautical miles (9.3 km) off Portpatrick, Wigtownshire. Her crew survived.
John Norman	United Kingdom	The barque was driven ashore at Harwich, Essex. She was on a voyage from Hamburg, Germany to Philadelphia, Pennsylvania, United States. She was refloated and taken in to Harwich.
Marie Honore	France	The ship departed from Cardiff, Glamorgan, United Kingdom for Marseille, Bouches-du-Rhône. No further trace, reported missing.
Marlborough	United Kingdom	The steamship sailed from Cardiff for Genoa, Italy. She was not seen or heard from again. The formal investigation found that the ship had poor stability, and was substantially overloaded and undermanned.
Neilson-Taylor	United Kingdom	The steamship ran aground on the Diamond Rocks, in the River Tay. She was on a voyage from Amble, Northumberland to Dundee, Forfarshire.
Pico	United Kingdom	The steamship sprang a leak and was beached on the coast of Venezuela. She was on a voyage from Maracaibo, Venezuela to Curaçao, Curaçao and Dependencies.

== 30 November ==
List of shipwrecks: 30 November 1879
Ship	State	Description
Carradale	United Kingdom	The barque was sighted off Deal, Kent whilst on a voyage from South Shields, County Durham to Bombay, India. No further trace, reported overdue.
Jacques Cœur	France	The barque was driven ashore and wrecked on Faial Island, Azores with the loss of eight of her thirteen crew. She was on a voyage from Havre de Grâce, Seine-Inférieure to Faial Island.
Jeune Mathilde	France	The ship ran aground in the Vilaine. She was on a voyage from Redon, Ille-et-Vilaine to Cardiff, Glamorgan, United Kingdom.
M. and E. Henderson	United States	The schooner went aground 300 yards (270 m) offshore and broke up near New Inlet, North Carolina one and a half miles (2.4 km) south of Life Saving Station No. 17, 6th District. Three crewmen washed ashore alive, her captain and three crewmen died.

== Unknown date ==
List of shipwrecks: Unknown date in November 1879
Ship	State	Description
Abbot Devereaux	United States	The schooner was wrecked near Port Royal, Jamaica. Her crew were rescued. She was on a voyage from Savannah-la-Mar to Kingston, Jamaica.
Alabama	United Kingdom	The steamship was driven ashore at Berville-sur-Seine, Seine-Inférieure, France and broke in two. Her crew were rescued by the tug Abeille No.5 (France). Alabama was on a voyage from New York, United States to Rouen, Seine-Inférieure.
Alevid	Norway	The schooner ran aground in the Gulf of Bothnia. She was on a voyage from Vaasa, Grand Duchy of Finland to Southampton, Hampshire, United Kingdom. She was refloated and resumed her voyage, but put in to Copenhagen, Denmark.
Alice Wood	United Kingdom	The brigantine was wrecked on the North Bull, in the Irish Sea off the coast of County Dublin. Her crew were rescued. She was on a voyage from Ardrossan, Ayrshire to Dublin.
Anna	Sweden	The brig was driven ashore on Fårö. She was on a voyage from Höganäs to Helsinki, Grand Duchy of Finland.
Anna Olivari	Italy	The barque was abandoned in the Atlantic Ocean. Her crew were rescued. She was on a voyage from Havre de Grâce, Seine-Inférieure, France to Buenos Aires, Argentina.
Ann Wilmot	United Kingdom	The smack was wrecked on the Scroby Sands, Norfolk. Her five crew were rescued by the Gorleston Lifeboat Leicester ( Royal National Lifeboat Institution).
Aydon Forest	United Kingdom	The barque ran aground at Batavia, Netherlands East Indies. She was on a voyage from Sydney, New South Wales to Batativa. She was refloated on 19 November.
Bellona	United Kingdom	The ship was driven ashore in Lake Saint-Pierre. She was on a voyage from Montreal, Quebec, Canada to Liverpool, Lancashire.
Bertha	Germany	The brig was driven ashore at Santa Anna. She was on a voyage from Mexico to an English port.
Canning	United Kingdom	The ship was abandoned at sea. She was on a voyage from Bremen, Germany to Philadelphia, Pennsylvania, United States.
Castlewood	United Kingdom	The steamship was driven ashore at När, Gotland, Sweden. Her crew survived. She floated off on 17 December and sank.
Clan Alpine	United Kingdom	The barque was wrecked in the Maldive Islands before 17 November. Her crew were rescued. She was on a voyage from Mauritius to Bombay, India.
Cypriot	United Kingdom	The ship ran aground in the Brass River and was abandoned.
Den Norske Bonde	Norway	The brig was wrecked at Lemvig, Denmark. Her crew were rescued. She was on a voyage from Newcastle upon Tyne, Northumberland, United Kingdom to Grimstad.
Desire	France	The brig was driven ashore at .
Despatch	United Kingdom	The fishing trawler was run down and sunk in the North Sea by a steamship with the loss of a crew member.
Edith Davis	United Kingdom	The ship was destroyed by fire at sea.
Eirene	United Kingdom	The steamship was driven ashore in the Strait of Belle Isle. She was declared a total loss.
El Majidi	Sultanate of Zanzibar	The ship foundered in the Persian Gulf off Socotra, Aden Governorate. There were a few survivors. She was on a voyage from Zanzibar to Bombay, India.
Enigheten	(Russian Empire) Grand Duchy of Finland	The schooner was abandoned in the Gulf of Finland. Her crew were rescued by the brig Onkel Peter (Denmark).
Escalada	Spain	The barque was driven ashore at Cape Cruz, Cuba. She was on a voyage from "Santa Ana" to St. Jago de Cuba, Cuba.
Espoir	France	The schooner collided with the brig Claude (France) at the mouth of the Gironde and was severely damaged.
Fanny Beck	United Kingdom	The brigantine foundered off Tava Island, off the coast of Patagonia on or after 8 November. She was on a voyage from Buenos Aires, Argentina to Patagonia.
Fjerde November	Norway	The ship was driven ashore on the Fahludd Reef, off Gotland, SWeden. She was on a voyage from Vyborg, Grand Duchy of Finland to Antwerp, Belgium.
Fleetwood	United Kingdom	The ship was wrecked at Bermuda. She was on a voyage from Charlottetown, Prince Edward Island, Canada to Bermuda.
Flora	United Kingdom	The fishing smack was driven ashore and wrecked 5 nautical miles (9.3 km) north of Withernsea, Yorkshire. Her crew were rescued.
Florence	Netherlands	The schooner was driven ashore in the Soela Strait. She was on a voyage from Delfzijl, Groningen to Narva, Russia.
Forrest Belle	United Kingdom	The ship was abandoned in the Atlantic Ocean. Her 30 crew were rescued by the steamship Fernwood (United Kingdom). Forrest Belle was on a voyage from New York to Queenstown, County Cork.
Fortuna	Italy	The barque foundered in the Pacific Ocean. Her crew were rescued.
Francesco Deak	Austria-Hungary	The ship foundered at sea. Her crew were rescued. She was on a voyage from Glasgow, Renfrewshire, United Kingdom to Philadelphia.
Freya	Germany	The brigantine was driven ashore at New Romney, Kent, United Kingdom. She was on a voyage from Rotterdam, South Holland, Netherlands to Nantes, Loire-Inférieure, France.
Friheden	Flag unknown	The ship ran aground on the Hen and Chickens Rocks.
Fritz	Norway	The barque foundered in the North Sea. Her crew were rescued by the schooner Carl Oscar (Sweden).
Frœde	Denmark	The schooner collided with the steamship Kestrel (United Kingdom) and sank in the English Channel off Beachy Head, Sussex, United Kingdom. Her crew were rescued. Froede was on a voyage from the Grand Duchy of Finland to Southampton, Hampshire, United Kingdom.
Fulica	United Kingdom	The steamship ran aground at New York.
G. H. Wappans	Netherlands	The ship ran aground off Batavia, Netherlands East Indies. She was on a voyage from Cheribon to Jakarta. She was refloated and taken in to Batavia.
Hansa	Germany	The full-rigged ship was driven ashore at Cape Henry, Virginia, United States. She was on a voyage from Bremen to Baltimore, Maryland, United States.
Haparanda	Sweden	The barque was driven ashore and wrecked on Martinique.
Harriet Upham	United Kingdom	The ship ran aground at Bermuda. She was on a voyage from St. Mary's to Montevideo, Uruguay. She was refloated.
Harry Davis	Canada	The ship was abandoned at sea before 13 November. She was on a voyage from Charlottetown, Prince Edward Island to Barbados.
Henry	United Kingdom	The ship ran aground on the Maplin Sand, in the North SEa off the coast of Essex and was abandoned by her crew. She was on a voyage from Wolgast, Germany to London. She was refloated and taken in to London.
Henry Scholefield	United Kingdom	The steamship struck a rock off the Isle of Skye, Outer Hebrides. She was on a voyage from Maryport, Cumberland to Riga, Russia. She put in to Greenock, Renfrewshire waterlogged at the bow and was placed under repair.
Johanna	France	The steamship struck rocks in the Hennebon and sank.
Johanna Holzerland	Germany	The barque was wrecked in the Rio Grande. She was on a voyage from Rotterdam to Buenos Aires, Argentina.
Kurrachee	United Kingdom	The full-rigged ship was destroyed by fire at sea. She was on a voyage from New York to Anjer, Netherlands East Indies.
Leentje	Netherlands	The brigantine was wrecked in the Rio Grande. She was on a voyage from Hamburg to the Rio Grande.
Leyte	(Spain) Spanish East Indies	The steamship was wrecked at Sual. Her crew were rescued.
Livingston	United Kingdom	The ship was driven ashore at the Delaware Breakwater. She was on a voyage from Galway to Philadelphia. She was refloated.
Lydia	United Kingdom	The ship was driven ashore and wrecked in the Saint Lawrence River at "Belsiametis", Quebec. She was on a voyage from Quebec City to Bowling, Dunbartonshire.
Maria	United Kingdom	The ship foundered in the North Sea before 4 October. Her crew were rescued by the steamship John Ormston (United Kingdom). Maria was on a voyage from Cuxhaven, Germany to London and/or Hartlepool, County Durham.
Maria Elena	Germany	The barque was wrecked in the Tonalá River.
Marie	Germany	The brigantine foundered with the loss of her captain. Five survivors were rescued. She was on a voyage from the Natal Colony to the English Channel.
Melea	United Kingdom	The brig foundered in the Baltic Sea 2 nautical miles (3.7 km) off the coast of Germany with the loss of three of her six crew. She was on a voyage from Sunderland, County Durham to Memel, Germany.
Mildred	United Kingdom	The steamship was driven ashore at Cape La Roche, Quebec. She was on a voyage from Montreal to London. She was later refloated and taken in to Quebec City.
Miranda	United Kingdom	The steamship ran into the jetty at Dunkirk, Nord, France and was damaged. She was on a voyage from Odesa Russia to Dunkirk. She was refloated and docked waterlogged at the bow.
Miss Thomas	United Kingdom	The schooner ran aground at "Holmetunge", Denmark. She was on a voyage from Portmadoc, Caernarfonshire to Stettin, Germany. She was refloated with assistance and taken in to Copenhagen.
Nelly	United Kingdom	The schooner was wrecked at "Little Pob". The wreck was plundered by the local inhabitants.
Ocean	Norway	The ship was abandoned in the Atlantic Ocean. Her crew were rescued by the steamship Fernwood (United Kingdom)
Ottowa	United Kingdom	The brig was wrecked at Bragança, Brazil. Her crew were rescued. She was on a voyage from Swansea, Glamorgan to Pará, Brazil.
Penguin	United Kingdom	The steamship was driven ashore and wrecked in the Red Sea. She was on a voyage from London to Colombo, Ceylon and Madras and Calcutta, India.
Phoenician	United Kingdom	The steamship ran aground in the Clyde at Greenock,.
Pride of the Ocean	United Kingdom	The smack foundered in the North Sea with the loss of all six crew.
Resolut	Norway	The barque was driven ashore 2 nautical miles (3.7 km) east of Dunkirk. She was on a voyage from Philadelphia to Dunkirk. She was refloated on 18 November with the assistance of two tugs and taken in to Dunkirk.
Rock Light	United Kingdom	The ship was sighted off Cape Henry, Virginia, United States whilst on a voyage from Philadelphia to Bristol, Gloucestershire. No further trace, presumed foundered with the loss of all 40 crew.
Rosa	Germany	The barque was driven ashore at Santa Anna.
Royal Arch	United Kingdom	The barque was abandoned in the Atlantic Ocean. Her crew were rescued. Royal Arch was on a voyage from Liverpool to Halifax, Nova Scotia, Canada. She was discovered on 8 November by a Red Star Line steamship, which put some of her crew on board with the intention of taking her in to New York. She was subsequently towed in to Halifax.
Sapphire	United Kingdom	The ship ran aground on The Shears. She was on a voyage from Newcastle upon Tyne to Philadelphia. She was refloated and resumed her voyage.
Silas H. Morse	Canada	The schooner was wrecked on the coast of Labrador, Newfoundland Colony. Her crew were rescued.
Sjotrollet	Sweden	The schooner was driven ashore. She was on a voyage from Vestervig to Rio de Janeiro, Brazil. She was refloated and taken in to Maassluis, South Holland in a leaky condition. Sjotrollet was placed under repair.
Storfursten	Russia	The ship was driven ashore at "Salvore". She was on a voyage from Turku, Grand Duchy of Finland to Tarragona, Spain.
Supreme	United Kingdom	The barque was driven ashore at Pudimadaka.
Syerman	Norway	The steamship ran aground at Kastrup, Denmark. She was refloated with assistance.
Terror	United Kingdom	The smack was abandoned in the North Sea. Her crew were rescued by a smack.
Valetta	United Kingdom	The steamship ran aground at Harwich.
Velinas	United Kingdom	The brig struck a sunken rock and was wrecked 30 nautical miles (56 km) from Caravelas, Brazil. She was on a voyage from Cardiff, Glamorgan to Santos, Brazil.
Vigilanten	Sweden	The full-rigged ship was wrecked on Fårö. Her crew were rescued. She was on a voyage from Saint Petersburg, Russia to Copenhagen, Denmark.
Violet	United Kingdom	The smack collided with a schooner and was abandoned. Her were rescued by the Gorleston Lifeboat Leicester ( Royal National Lifeboat Institution).
Wilhelmine	Flag unknown	The ship ran aground on the Nore. She was on a voyage from Copenhagen, Denmark to Riga, Russia. She was refloated with the assistance of a tug and three smacks and found to be waterlogged.
William and May	United Kingdom	The schooner was abandoned in the North Sea. Her crew were rescued by a smack. She was subsequently towed in to Grimsby, Lincolnshire.
Witch	United Kingdom	The barque ran aground on the Bredegrund, in the Baltic Sea and sank.
