= Jane Miller =

Jane Miller may refer to:

- Jane Miller (poet) (born 1949), American poet
- Jane Miller (diplomat), British diplomat
- SS Jane Miller, a cargo ship that sank near Wiarton, Ontario
- Jane Miller Thengberg, (née Miller; 1822–1902), Swedish-Scottish teacher

== See also ==
- Jane Millar (born 1953), professor of social policy
