= Lunestedt station =

Railway station in Lunestedt, Germany

Coordinates: 53.440219°N 8.729796°E

Lunestedt

General information
- Other names: Freschluneberg (until 1971)
- Location: Lunestedt, Beverstedt, Lower Saxony; Germany
- Platforms: 2

Other information
- Station code: 3858
- DS100 code: HLUN
- Category: 6
- Fare zone: VBN: 230

Passengers
- ~109,500 daily

Services
Preceding station	Bremen S-Bahn	Following station
Loxstedt towards Bremerhaven-Lehe	RS2	Stubben towards Twistringen
Location

Lunestedt is a railway station situated on the Bremerhaven to Bremen line. It is situated in the village of Lunestedt in the district of Cuxhaven in Lower Saxony, one of the states of Germany.

== Operational usage ==
RegionalBahn trains from Bremerhaven to Bremen call at the station, offering an hourly connection to both cities, with some peak services during the early morning and afternoon hours.
