= Carl Vinnen =

German painter (1863–1922)

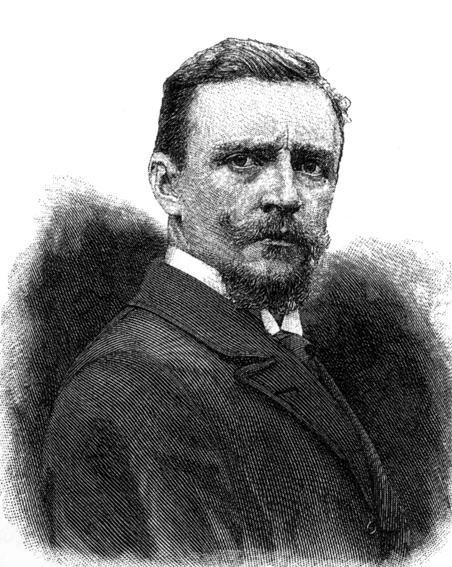
Carl Vinnen; from Die Worpsweder (1899)

Carl Vinnen (28 August 1863, Bremen - 16 April 1922, Munich) was a German landscape painter. He was also a writer, on various topics of local interest, under the pseudonym "Johann Heinrich Fischbeck".

== Life and work ==
He was born to Johann Christoph Vinnen (1829–1912), a shipping company owner, and his wife, Jenny Friederike née Westenfeld, who died when Carl was only seven. His younger brother, Adolf Vinnen, also went into the shipping business and became a politician. After finishing school, he worked for his father's company. At the age of twenty-three, he began his studies at the Kunstakademie Düsseldorf, with Heinrich Lauenstein and Hugo Crola. He also took private lessons from Eugen Dücker. In 1888, he continued his studies in Karlsruhe. He was heavily influenced by the works of Arnold Böcklin, and focused on painting melancholy landscapes.

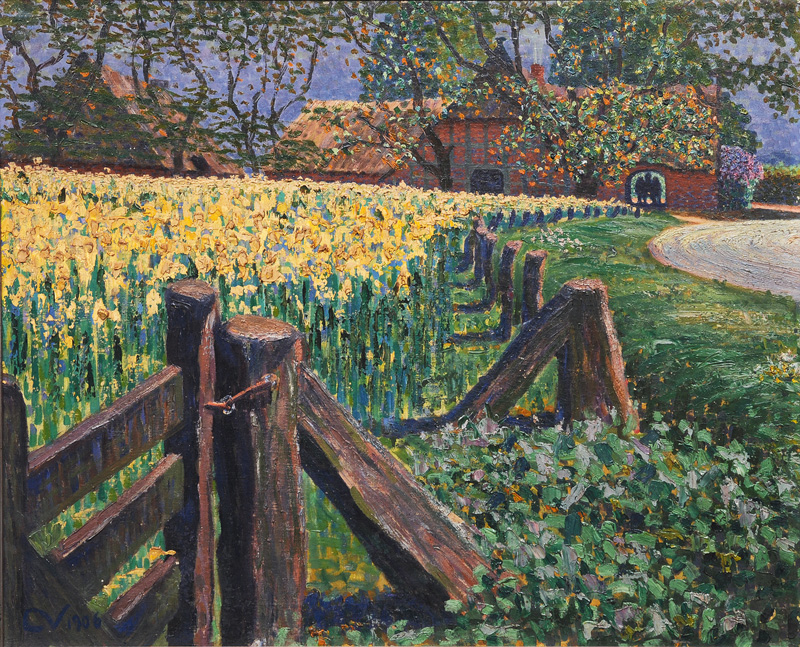
Summer in Worpswede

In Düsseldorf, he made the acquaintance of Fritz Mackensen and Otto Modersohn, who would later be among the founders of the Worpswede Artists' Colony. Although he never actually lived there, he came to be perceived as a member, and helped create the "Künstlervereinigung Worpswede" (artist's association), to promote their works; an enterprise for which his earlier commercial training proved useful. A joint exhibition by the Colony and the Munich Secession, at the Glasplast in 1895, received critical praise.

He maintained a studio at the family estate in Osterndorf. In winter, he painted from a portable, heated studio. Thanks to his family's wealth, he could afford to travel often; not only throughout Europe, but to Asia and Africa as well. In 1902, when the poet, Rainer Maria Rilke, wrote a book about the Worpswede Colony, Vinnen declined to be included. That same year, he became engaged, to Anna Lagemann, but the wedding did not take place until many years later. In 1903, he was awarded a small gold medal at the Große Berliner Kunstausstellung. Shortly after, he became a member of the Deutscher Künstlerbund.

In his later years, he moved away from his association with Worpswede. In 1908, he physically moved, from Osterndorf to Cuxhaven, where he focused on maritime motifs. In 1911, he led a protest against the growing influence of French art; occasioned by the acquisition of Van Gogh's Poppy Field, by the Kunsthalle Bremen; under the direction of Gustav Pauli. He published several manifestos on the subject.

At the beginning of World War I, he moved to Munich, where he had a second home. After the war, in 1919, he finally married his longtime fiancée, Anna. Within a few months, he suffered a stroke. He died of a second stroke in 1922, and was interred at his family's private cemetery in Osterndorf.

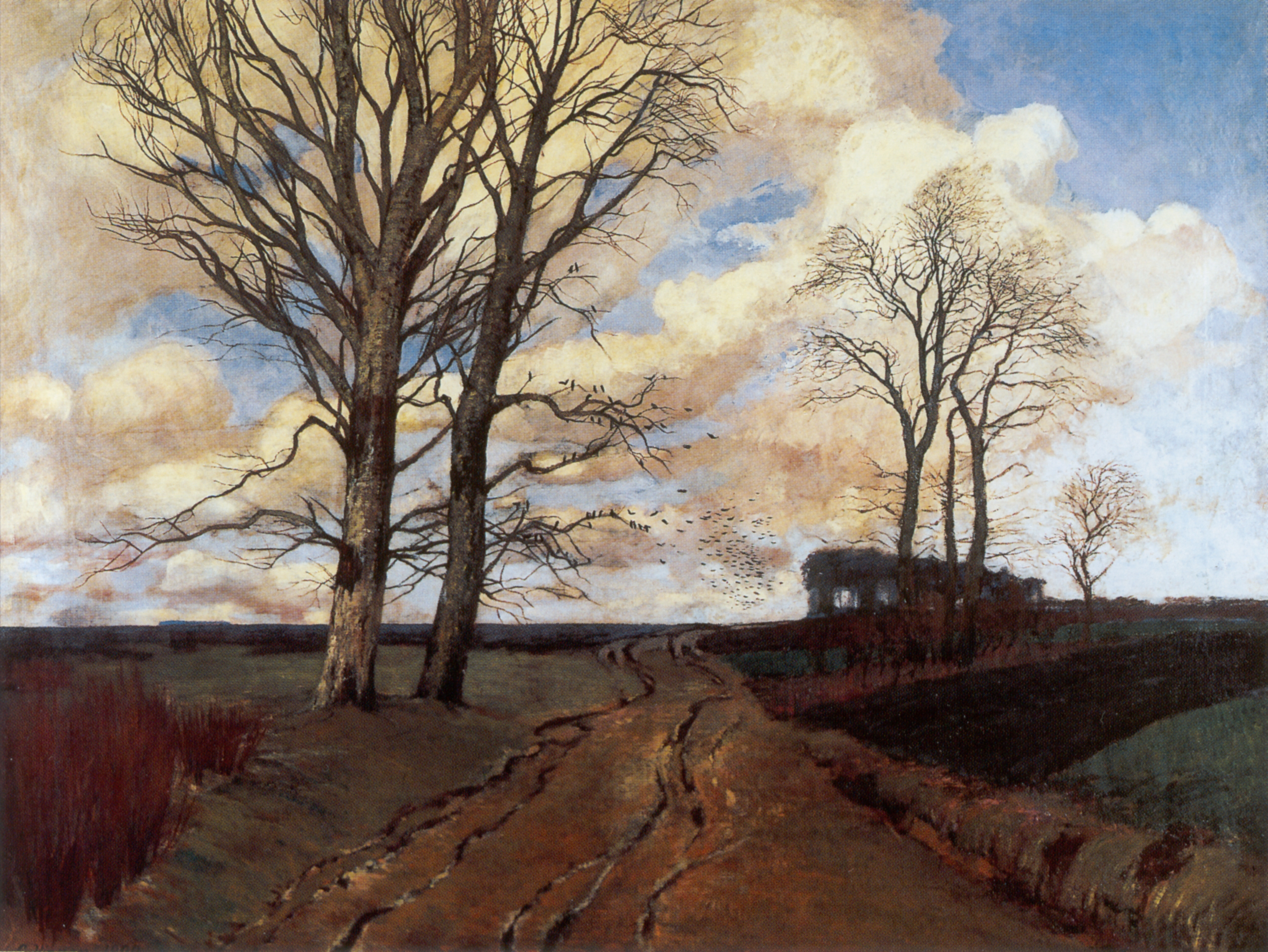
On the Moor
