= Stubben =

- Ortsteil of Beverstedt
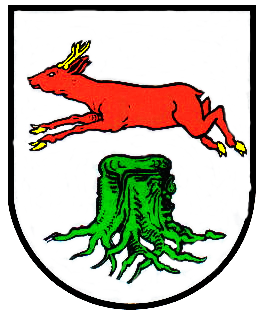
- Coat of arms
- Interactive map of Stubben
- Location within Germany Location within Lower Saxony
- Coordinates: 53°24′36″N 08°47′09″E
- Country: Germany
- State: Lower Saxony
- District: Cuxhaven
- Municipality: Beverstedt
- Subdivisions: 4 Ortsteile

Area
  - Total: 8.62 km^{2} (3.33 sq mi)
- Elevation: 14 m (46 ft)

Population (2010-12-31)
  - Total: 1,537
  - Density: 178/km^{2} (462/sq mi)
- Time zone: UTC+01:00 (CET)
  - Summer (DST): UTC+02:00 (CEST)
- Postal codes: 27616
- Dialling codes: 04748
- Vehicle registration: CUX
- Website: www.beverstedt.de

Stubben is a village and a former municipality in the district of Cuxhaven, in Lower Saxony, Germany. Since 1 November 2011, it is part of the municipality Beverstedt. The name means, roughly 'tree stump.' The area of Stubben was once a forest area full of deer and other wildlife.

Archaeological finds show that at least 10,000 years ago, reindeer hunters once lived in this region, and large stone tombs and finds from the Neolithic period indicate a continuous settlement since then. Stubben belonged to the Prince-Archbishopric of Bremen, established in 1180. In 1648 the Prince-Archbishopric was transformed into the Duchy of Bremen, which was first ruled in personal union by the Swedish Crown - interrupted by a Danish occupation (1712–1715) - and from 1715 on by the Hanoverian Crown. In 1807 the ephemeric Kingdom of Westphalia annexed the Duchy, before France annexed it in 1810. In 1813 the Duchy was restored to the Electorate of Hanover, which - after its upgrade to the Kingdom of Hanover in 1814 - incorporated the Duchy in a real union and the Ducal territory, including Stubben, became part of the new Stade Region, established in 1823.

The town really began to grow when Stubben station was built as part of the Bremen–Bremerhaven line, allowing the residents to get to the nearby cities where they worked. Stubben grew and merged with the former independent communities of Adelstedt, Brunshausen, and Elfershude and with the Erbhof Plein, an area which previously belonged to neighbouring Bokel.

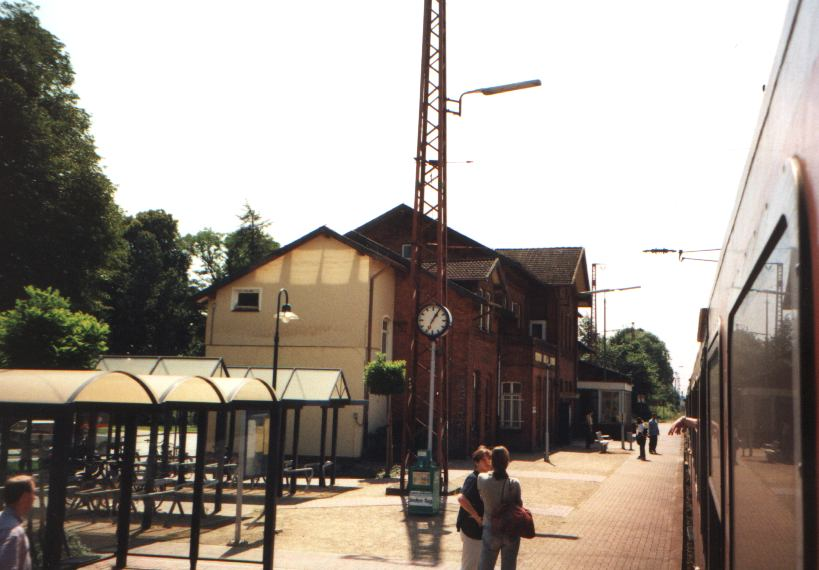
Stubben station

The Stubben railway station eventually developed into a major transhipment point for livestock, timber, fertilizer and agricultural products. A dairy was built near the station in 1904 (today a concrete factory). Today the railway line is part of line RS 2 of the Bremen S-Bahn, running hourly between Bremerhaven-Lehe and Twistringen. Bremen and Bremerhaven are within an hour away by train. Together with the importance of highway 134, with the Beverstedt Hagen and the Bundesautobahn 27, the town is the hub of many convenient transport links. The Stubben community has about 1,600 inhabitants and belongs to the Beverstedt municipality.

Today the town boasts a butcher shop, a doctor's office, a pharmacy and a restaurant with rooms, a bowling alley, a hairdresser salon, a flower shop, a video store, a gift shop, a pizza delivery service and a car repair shop with petrol station.

For leisure, there are sports facilities including a gym, football field and tennis courts. The town also has a voluntary fire brigade. Stubben has a seniors' meeting place and a youth centre. More shopping and cultural activities are only 4 km away in Beverstedt, which is also easily accessible by bicycle.

Schoolchildren are bused to Bokel and Beverstedt (2 and 4 km away) for most of their studies.
