= Heerstedt =

- Ortsteil of Beverstedt
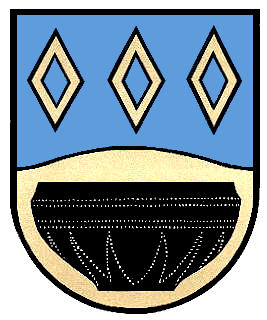
- Coat of arms
- Interactive map of Heerstedt
- Location within Germany Location within Lower Saxony
- Coordinates: 53°27′56″N 08°45′52″E
- Country: Germany
- State: Lower Saxony
- District: Cuxhaven
- Municipality: Beverstedt
- Subdivisions: 3 Ortsteile

Area
  - Total: 18.89 km^{2} (7.29 sq mi)
- Elevation: 11 m (36 ft)

Population (2010-12-31)
  - Total: 453
  - Density: 24.0/km^{2} (62.1/sq mi)
- Time zone: UTC+01:00 (CET)
  - Summer (DST): UTC+02:00 (CEST)
- Postal codes: 27616
- Dialling codes: 04747
- Vehicle registration: CUX
- Website: www.beverstedt.de

Heerstedt is a village and a former municipality in the district of Cuxhaven, in Lower Saxony, Germany. Since 1 November 2011, it is part of the municipality Beverstedt.

Heerstedt belonged to the Prince-Archbishopric of Bremen, established in 1180. In 1648, the Prince-Archbishopric was transformed into the Duchy of Bremen, which was first ruled in personal union by the Swedish Crown - interrupted by a Danish occupation (1712-1715) - and from 1715 on by the Hanoverian Crown. The Kingdom of Hanover incorporated the Duchy in a real union and the Ducal territory, including Heerstedt, became part of the new Stade Region, established in 1823.
