= Frelsdorf =

- Ortsteil of Beverstedt
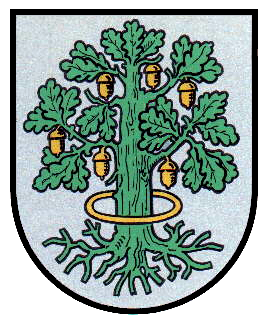
- Coat of arms
- Interactive map of Frelsdorf
- Location within Germany Location within Lower Saxony
- Coordinates: 53°29′35″N 08°54′02″E
- Country: Germany
- State: Lower Saxony
- District: Cuxhaven
- Municipality: Beverstedt
- Subdivisions: 3 Ortsteile

Area
  - Total: 25.29 km^{2} (9.76 sq mi)
- Elevation: 13 m (43 ft)

Population (2010-12-31)
  - Total: 708
  - Density: 28.0/km^{2} (72.5/sq mi)
- Time zone: UTC+01:00 (CET)
  - Summer (DST): UTC+02:00 (CEST)
- Postal codes: 27616
- Dialling codes: 04749
- Vehicle registration: CUX
- Website: www.beverstedt.de

Frelsdorf is a village and a former municipality in the district of Cuxhaven, in Lower Saxony, Germany. Since 1 November 2011, it is part of the municipality Beverstedt.

Frelsdorf belonged to the Prince-Archbishopric of Bremen, established in 1180. The first written record of the village is in a document by Archbishop Hildepold of Bremen, in which he calls it "Fridlestorpe." However, the village is also named in sources as "Fritilo," "Frittilo," "Frithelo," "Friedelo," and "Fredelo."

In 1648 the Prince-Archbishopric was transformed into the Duchy of Bremen, which was first ruled in personal union by the Swedish Crown - interrupted by a Danish occupation (1712–1715) - and from 1715 on by the Hanoverian Crown. In 1807 the ephemeric Kingdom of Westphalia annexed the Duchy, before France annexed it in 1810. In 1813 the Duchy was restored to the Electorate of Hanover, which - after its upgrade to the Kingdom of Hanover in 1814 - incorporated the Duchy in a real union and the Ducal territory, including Frelsdorf, became part of the new Stade Region, established in 1823.

A monument in the town center honors the town's fallen soldiers of World War II.
