= Appeln =

- Ortsteil of Beverstedt
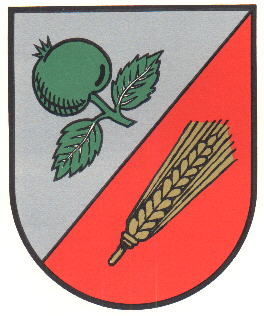
- Coat of arms

- Appeln in Beverstedt
- Interactive map of Appeln
- Location within Germany Location within Lower Saxony
- Coordinates: 53°27′13″N 8°53′51″E
- Country: Germany
- State: Lower Saxony
- District: Cuxhaven
- Municipality: Beverstedt

Area
  - Total: 14.52 km^{2} (5.61 sq mi)
- Elevation: 14 m (46 ft)

Population (2010-12-31)
  - Total: 428
  - Density: 29.5/km^{2} (76.3/sq mi)
- Time zone: UTC+01:00 (CET)
  - Summer (DST): UTC+02:00 (CEST)
- Postal codes: 27616
- Dialling codes: 04747
- Website: www.beverstedt.de

Appeln is a village and a former municipality in the district of Cuxhaven, in Lower Saxony, Germany. Since 1 November 2011, it is part of the municipality Beverstedt.

Appeln belonged to the Prince-Archbishopric of Bremen, established in 1180. In 1648 the Prince-Archbishopric was transformed into the Duchy of Bremen, which was first ruled in personal union by the Swedish Crown - interrupted by a Danish occupation (1712–1715) - and from 1715 on by the Hanoverian Crown. In 1807 the ephemeric Kingdom of Westphalia annexed the Duchy, before France annexed it in 1810. In 1813 the Duchy was restored to the Electorate of Hanover, which - after its upgrade to the Kingdom of Hanover in 1814 - incorporated the Duchy in a real union and the Ducal territory, including Appeln, became part of the new Stade Region, established in 1823.
