= Stubben station =

Railway station in Stubben, Germany

Coordinates: 53.405656°N 8.780383°E

Stubben
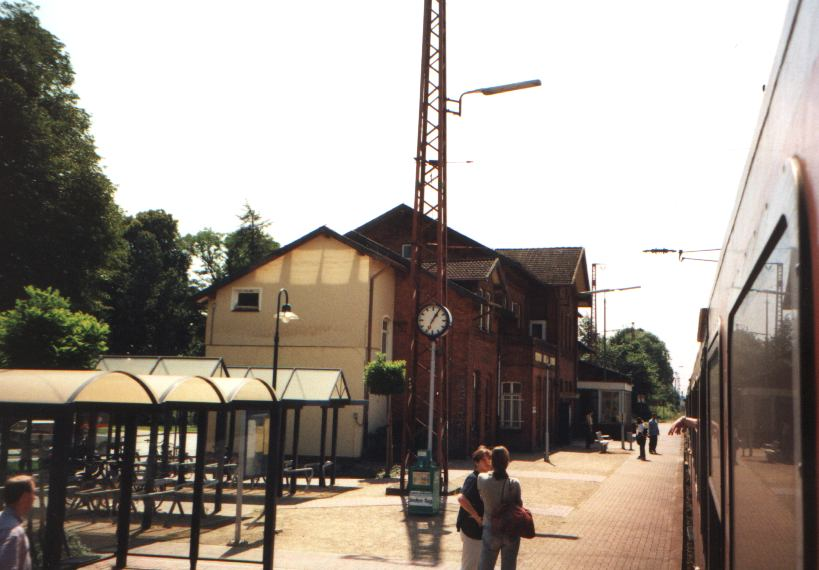

General information
- Location: Stubben, Beverstedt, Lower Saxony; Germany
- Platforms: 2

Other information
- Station code: 6067
- DS100 code: HSUB
- IBNR: 05763
- Category: 5
- Fare zone: VBN: 230

Services
| Preceding station | Bremen S-Bahn | Following station |
|---|---|---|
| Lunestedt towards Bremerhaven-Lehe | RS2 | Lübberstedt towards Twistringen |
Location

Stubben is the name of a railway station on the Cuxhaven to Bremen line, situated in the village of Stubben in the district of Cuxhaven in Lower Saxony, one of the states of Germany.

== Operational usage ==
RegionalBahn trains from Bremerhaven to Bremen call at the station, offering an hourly connection to both cities, with some peak services during the early morning and afternoon hours. A park and ride facility is situated close to the station. Local initiatives are lobbying for the RegionalExpress trains between Bremen and Bremerhaven to call at Stubben after modernisation.
