= Jane Millar =

Jane Isobel Millar, OBE, FBA, FAcSS (born 7 July 1953) is Professor of Social Policy and was previously the Pro-Vice Chancellor Research, University of Bath. Her research focuses on policy, families, and social security. She is a member of the Council of the Academy of Social Sciences.

== Recognition ==
- Elected a Fellow of the British Academy (2014)
- Awarded Officer of the Order of the British Empire (2001) for services to social policy research and teaching.
- Elected to Academy of Social Sciences (2000).
- Elected Fellow of the Royal Society of Arts
- Elected Fellow of the Higher Education Academy
