= Düring =

Düring is a surname. Notable people with the name include:

- Christian Düring (born 1939), German former sports shooter
- Deborah Düring (born 1994), German politician
- Jan Erik Düring (1926–2014), Norwegian film director
- Niclas Düring (born 1990), Swedish sailor
- Ingemar Düring (1903–1984), Swedish classical philologist
- Svend von Düring (1915–1969), Norwegian actor

== See also ==
- Eugen Dühring (1833–1921), German economist and philosopher
