= Bokel, Lower Saxony =

Bokel
- Ortsteil of Beverstedt
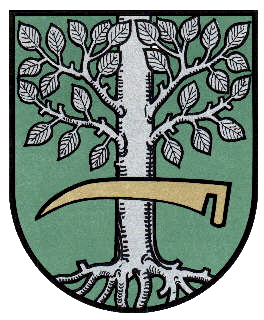
- Coat of arms

- Bokel in Beverstedt
- Interactive map of Bokel
- Location within Germany Location within Lower Saxony
- Coordinates: 53°23′N 08°46′E
- Country: Germany
- State: Lower Saxony
- District: Cuxhaven
- Municipality: Beverstedt
- Subdivisions: 5 Ortsteile

Area
  - Total: 20.96 km^{2} (8.09 sq mi)
- Elevation: 10 m (33 ft)

Population (2010-12-31)
  - Total: 2,511
  - Density: 119.8/km^{2} (310.3/sq mi)
- Time zone: UTC+01:00 (CET)
  - Summer (DST): UTC+02:00 (CEST)
- Postal codes: 27616
- Dialling codes: 04748
- Website: www.beverstedt.de

Bokel (German pronunciation: [ˈboːkl̩]) is a village and a former municipality in the district of Cuxhaven, in Lower Saxony, Germany. Since 1 November 2011, it has been part of the municipality of Beverstedt.

Bokel belonged to the Prince-Archbishopric of Bremen, established in 1180. In 1648 the Prince-Archbishopric was transformed into the Duchy of Bremen, which was first ruled in personal union by the Swedish Crown - interrupted by a Danish occupation (1712–1715) - and from 1715 on by the Hanoverian Crown. The Kingdom of Hanover incorporated the Duchy in a real union and the Ducal territory, including Bokel, became part of the new Stade Region, established in 1823.
