= Kirchwistedt =

- Ortsteil of Beverstedt
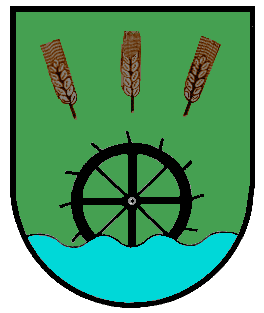
- Coat of arms
- Interactive map of Kirchwistedt
- Location within Germany Location within Lower Saxony
- Coordinates: 53°25′26″N 08°53′36″E
- Country: Germany
- State: Lower Saxony
- District: Cuxhaven
- Municipality: Beverstedt
- Subdivisions: 5 Ortsteile

Area
  - Total: 25.07 km^{2} (9.68 sq mi)
- Elevation: 14 m (46 ft)

Population (2010-12-31)
  - Total: 468
  - Density: 18.7/km^{2} (48.3/sq mi)
- Time zone: UTC+01:00 (CET)
  - Summer (DST): UTC+02:00 (CEST)
- Postal codes: 27616
- Dialling codes: 04747
- Vehicle registration: CUX
- Website: www.beverstedt.de

Kirchwistedt is a village and a former municipality in the district of Cuxhaven, in Lower Saxony, Germany. Since 1 November 2011, it is part of the municipality Beverstedt.

Kirchwistedt belonged to the Prince-Archbishopric of Bremen. In 1648 the Prince-Archbishopric was transformed into the Duchy of Bremen, which was first ruled in personal union by the Swedish and from 1715 on by the Hanoverian Crown. In 1823 the Duchy was abolished and its territory became part of the Stade Region.
