= SS Jane Miller =

Great Lakes cargo ship

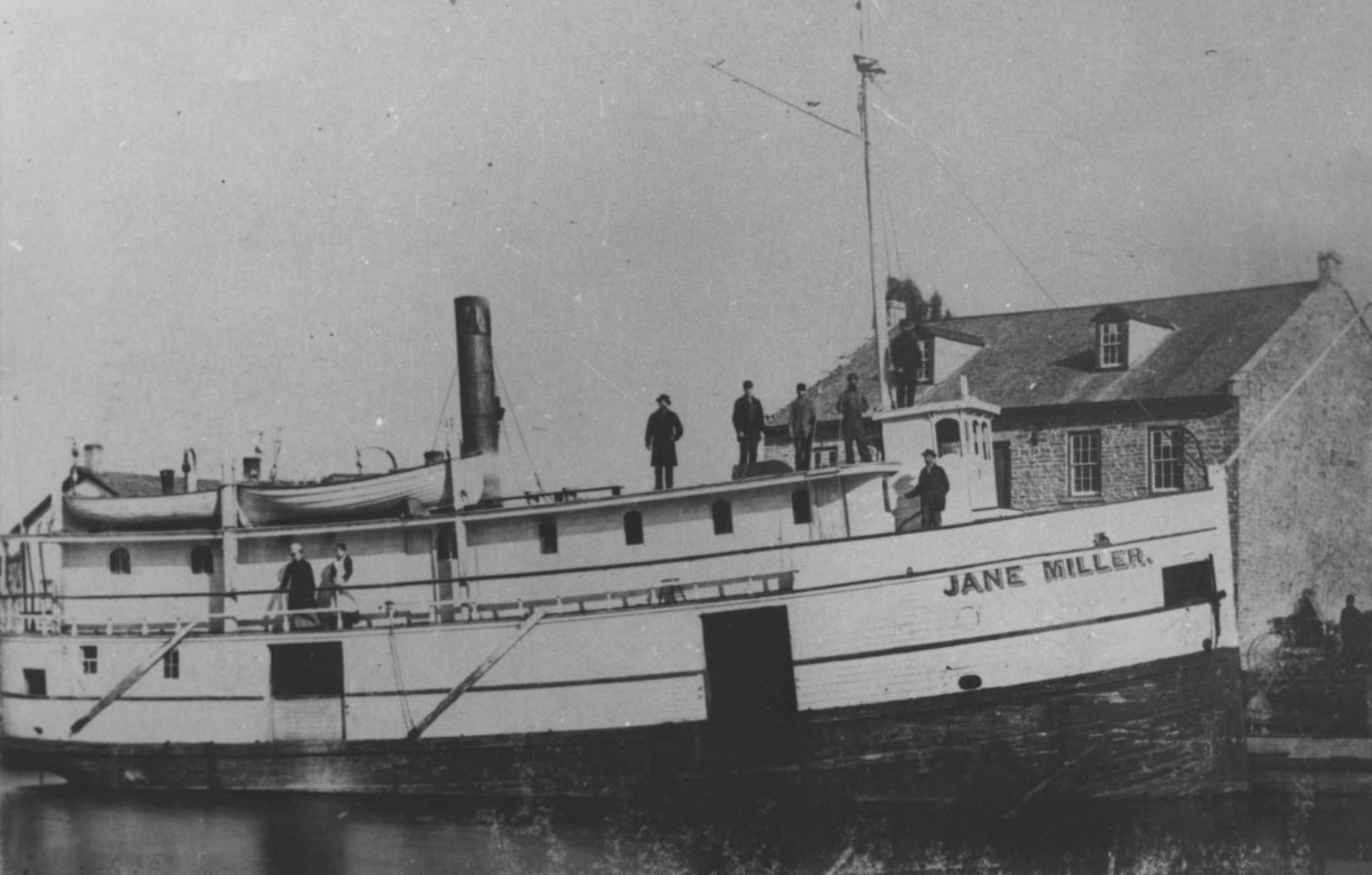
- Jane Miller

History
- Name: Jane Miller
- Owner: Andrew Port
- Builder: Crop's shipyard in Little Current, ON
- Completed: 1879
- Fate: Lost in a storm on November 25, 1881 with 28 passengers and crew

General characteristics
- Type: Cargo Ship
- Tonnage: 210 gross tons
- Length: 78 ft (24 m)
- Beam: 18 ft (5.5 m)
- Installed power: Wood-fired steam engine
- Crew: 10

SS Jane Miller was a cargo ship that sank with the loss of 28 lives near Wiarton, Ontario on Georgian Bay on November 25, 1881. Her wreck was discovered in 2017 resting upright in over 100 feet (30 m) of water.

== History ==
The Jane Miller was built in 1879 for James Miller & Sons, and was used as a small freighter along the Bruce Peninsula and North Channel of Georgian Bay. In September 1879 the ship collided with the schooner Mountaineer at night on Owen Sound, badly damaging the schooner. She was sold to Andrew Port in June 1880 to be used in general freight service along the south shore of Georgian Bay, the east side of the Bruce Peninsula, and Manitoulin Island.

== Sinking ==
On the afternoon of November 25, 1881, the Jane Miller departed Owen Sound with a load of cargo. She arrived in Meaford, where thirty additional tons of cargo was loaded, much of which was stored on deck. The Jane Miller departed Meaford in the late afternoon headed for Spencer's Wharf near Wiarton as a blizzard began to blow, with winds from the southwest. The strong winds and rough seas required a stop en route at Big Bay for additional cord-wood for fuel. Departing Big Bay between 8 and 9 PM, eyewitnesses saw the Jane Miller pass White Cloud Island and enter Colpoys Bay. As she approached Spencer's Wharf, the blizzard intensified for a few minutes, and when the snow abated the Jane Miller had vanished without a trace.

== Aftermath ==
The Jane Miller had little to no permanent ballast on board, instead relying on the weight of the fuel and cargo in her hold to keep her properly trimmed. It was speculated that the blizzard had resulted in the Jane Miller consuming more of her fuel than expected and that, combined with the extra cargo loaded at Meaford, had made the ship top heavy. When the snowstorm increased in intensity in Colpoys Bay, a strong gust of wind flipped her on her side, and she sank in minutes.

On December 4, three men started rowing from near Spencer's Wharf towards White Cloud Island to see if they could find any indication of the missing ship. Half a mile northeast of Spencer's Wharf they discovered a patch of discoloured water with air bubbles rising to the surface. Bearings from certain points on the shore were made, and the position was later determined to be very close to the last observed location of the Jane Miller. Continuing on to White Cloud Island they found in a bay several items, including "oars, some pins of the lifeboat, a piece of a mast, and a steamers gang plank". The tugboat Tommy Wright dragged the area hoping to find the wreck, but was unsuccessful as soundings revealed depths greater than 33 fathoms (198 feet or 60.35 metres) in the area.

A historical plaque was erected near Spencer's Wharf to commemorate the sinking.

In addition to the 9–10 crew members, there were an additional ten passengers whose names were not recorded, bound for Lion's Head or Tobermory to work as labourers over the winter.

== Shipwreck ==
The wreck of the Jane Miller was discovered on July 27, 2017 by a shipwreck hunting team made up of Jared Daniel, Jerry Eliason and Ken Merryman, operating with a permit issued by the Ontario Ministry of Tourism, Culture and Sport. The discovery was announced on November 25, 2017, the 136th anniversary of the sinking. The wreck is upright, in over 100 feet of water. The pilothouse, smokestack, and upper deck cabins have collapsed, but the hull is mostly intact, and the mast and three lifeboat davits are still in place. The permit did not allow for the divers to enter, but Daniel reported seeing sixteen corpses inside the hull. Merryman admitted that he was unsure if they had seen any human remains, since the wreck is heavily encrusted with zebra mussels, making identification of any such remains very difficult. A subsequent investigation of the wreck by divers from the Ontario Provincial Police and Canadian Forces did not find any human remains. Despite this, the wreck of the Jane Miller has been designated a protected archaeological site under the Ontario Heritage Act, and Merryman has not released the exact position and depth of the wreck, in order to further protect the site.
