= Beverstedt =

- Municipality
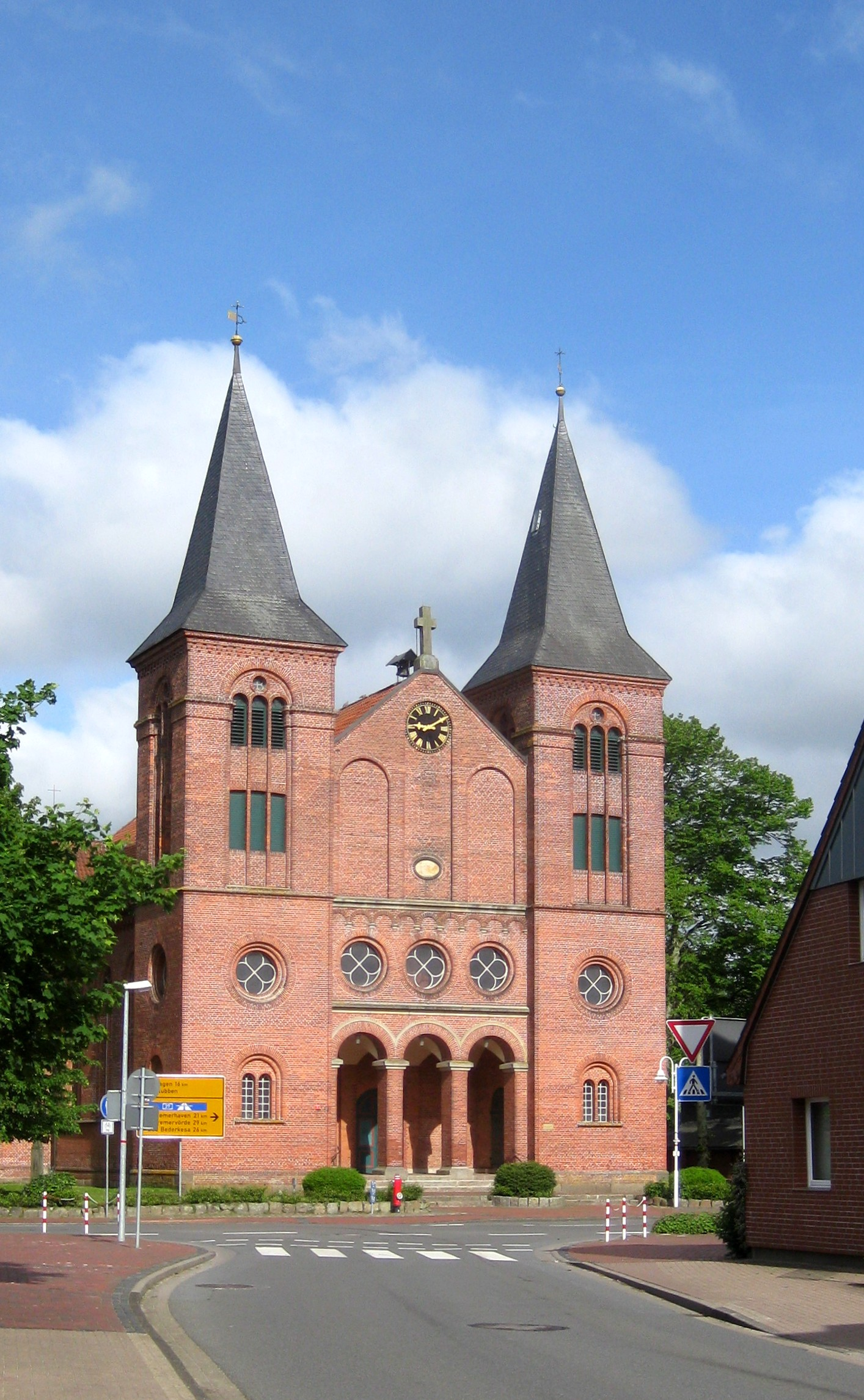
- Church of Saints Fabian and Sebastian

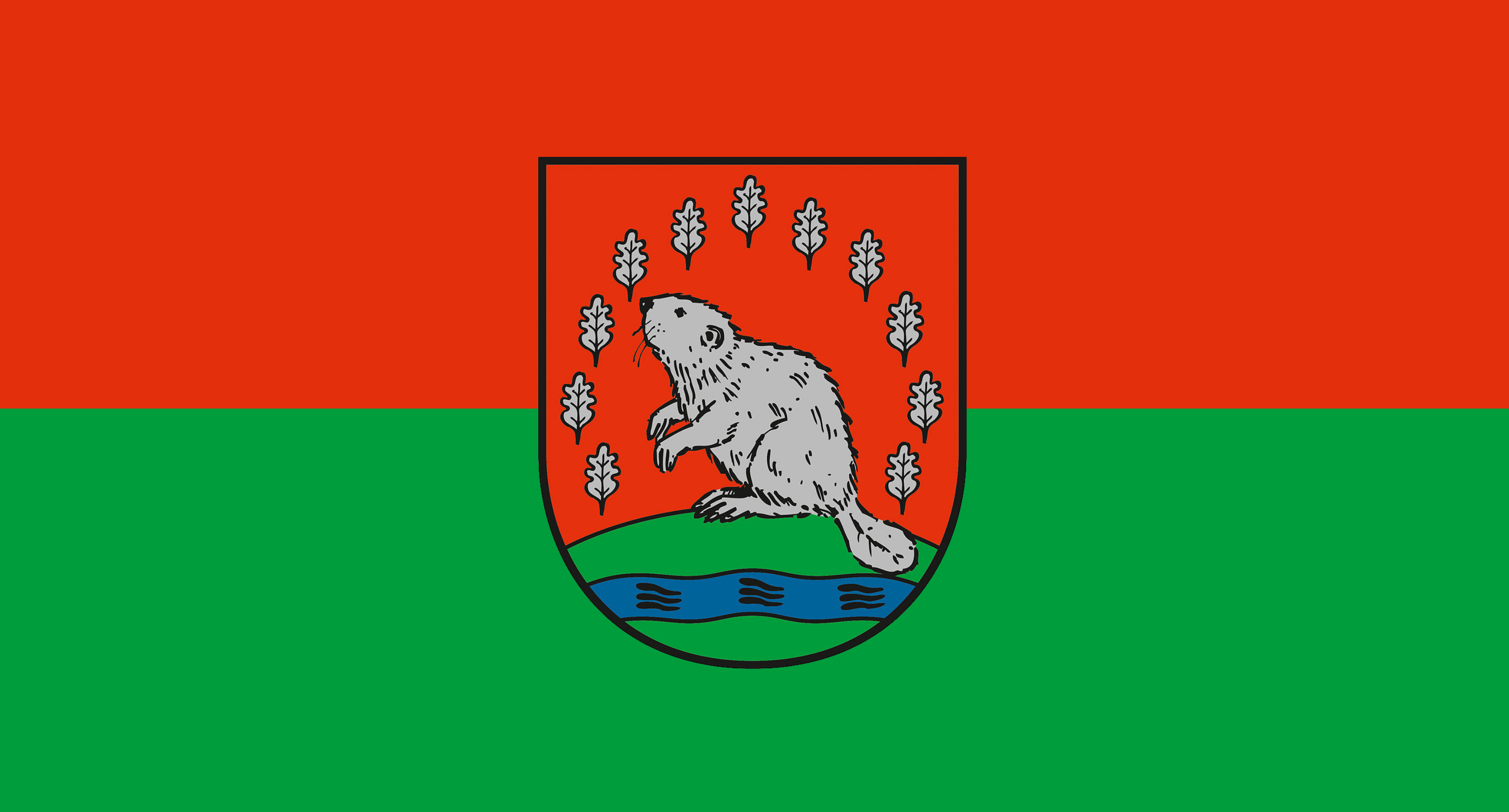
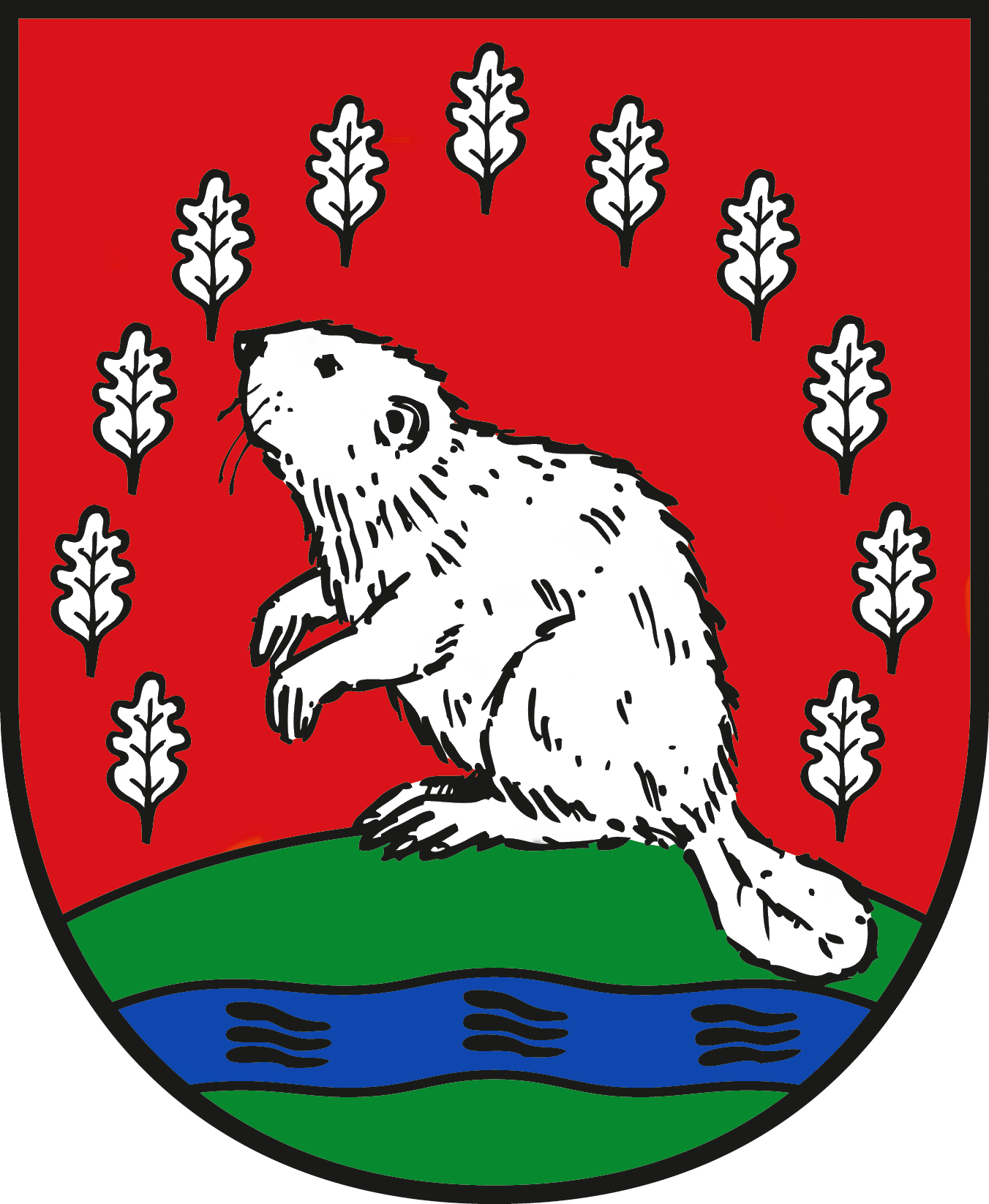
- Flag Coat of arms

- Location of Beverstedt within Cuxhaven district
- Interactive map of Beverstedt
- Location within Germany Location within Lower Saxony
- Coordinates: 53°26′N 08°49′E
- Country: Germany
- State: Lower Saxony
- District: Cuxhaven

Government
  - Mayor (2019–24): Guido Dieckmann (Ind.)

Area
  - Total: 197.6 km^{2} (76.3 sq mi)
- Elevation: 14 m (46 ft)

Population (2025-12-31)
  - Total: 13,335
  - Density: 67.48/km^{2} (174.8/sq mi)
- Time zone: UTC+01:00 (CET)
  - Summer (DST): UTC+02:00 (CEST)
- Postal codes: 27616
- Dialling codes: 04747
- Vehicle registration: CUX
- Website: www.beverstedt.de

Beverstedt is a municipality in the district of Cuxhaven, in Lower Saxony, Germany. It is situated approximately 20 km southeast of Bremerhaven, and 40 km north of Bremen.

Beverstedt belonged to the Prince-Archbishopric of Bremen. In 1648 the Prince-Archbishopric was transformed into the Duchy of Bremen, which was first ruled in personal union by the Swedish and from 1715 on by the Hanoverian Crown. In 1823 the Duchy was abolished and its territory became part of the Stade Region.

Beverstedt was the seat of the former Samtgemeinde ("collective municipality") Beverstedt.

== Transport ==
The municipality is connected to the road network by means of the Bundesstraße 71. It is also connected to the railway network by Stubben railway station.
