= Wümme Depression =

Landscape in Lower Saxony, Germany

Coordinates: 53°9′50″N 9°27′55″E

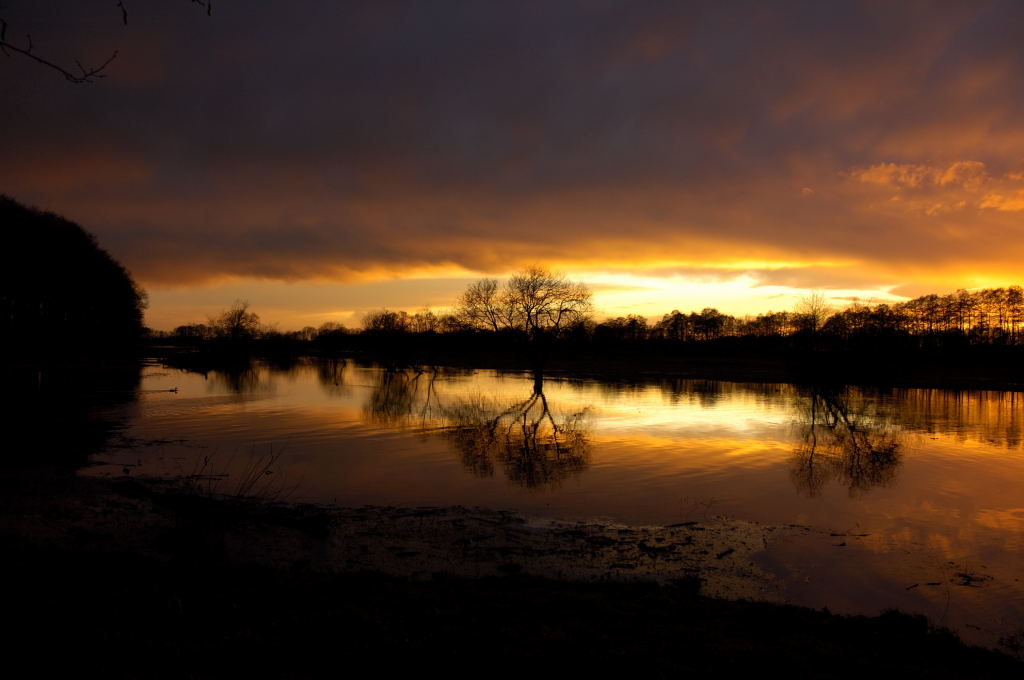
Wümme Depression near the Scheeßel Mill

The Wümme Depression (German: Wümmeniederung) is a bog, geest and forest landscape within the Elbe–Weser triangle in the German state of Lower Saxony. It belongs mainly to the district of Rotenburg and is part of the Stade Geest. To the south it borders on the Achim-Verden Geest. It has no sharply defined boundary with the Lüneburg Heath; as a result many places are seen as belonging to both regions. Typical of the gently undulating terrain are the many small rivers, streams and lakes. These include the rivers Wümme, Wieste, Fintau, Rodau, Wiedau and Vissel, as well as the twin lakes known in German as the Bullenseen. In this ancient landscape Low German is commonly spoken.

The Wümme Depression is designated by the European Environment Agency (EEA) as a Special Area of Conservation (SAC), no. DE2723331, within their Natura 2000 ecological network. The SAC has an area of 8,578.95 hectares (33.1235 sq mi).

The villages and towns of the Wümme Depression are:

- Rotenburg an der Wümme
- Scheeßel
- Lauenbrück
- Fintel
- Gyhum
- Sottrum
- Ahausen
- Ottersberg
- Fischerhude
- Bothel
- Visselhövede
