= List of nature reserves in Lower Saxony =

There are 764 nature reserves in the state of Lower Saxony in north Germany, covering a total area of 250,578 hectares (619,190 acres) as at 31 December 2008.

These reserves currently form about 4.72% of the land area in the state, including the coastal waters out to 12 nautical miles (22 km). In addition, there are two national parks and one biosphere reserve that are also under strict protection and which raise the area coverage to 11.32%.

The table below shows a selection of these reserves. Where a nature reserve extends over several rural (Landkreise) or urban districts (Kreisfreie Städte) these are given in order of the size area covered. By sorting on the column "Rural/Urban District" the reserves that are found wholly or partially within a district can be seen at a glance. In order to locate the other areas, use the search function of your computer keyboard (CTRL / Ctrl + F).

The NSG Nos. (i.e. nature reserve numbers) are based on the former provinces (Regierungsbezirken) (BR = Brunswick, HA = Hanover, LÜ = Lüneburg, WE = Weser-Ems).

NSG No.	Name of the nature reserve	Rural / Urban District	Area (ha)
BR 001	Riddagshausen	City of Brunswick	526
BR 006	Upper Harz	Goslar district	513
BR 017	Alleraue Forest (Allerauenwald) in the Drömling	Helmstedt district	94.7
BR 023	Bullenkuhle	Gifhorn district	2.3
BR 038	Seeburger See	Göttingen district	122.1
BR 043	Oker Valley	Goslar district 206 ha Wolfenbüttel district 40 ha	246
BR 051	Großes Moor (near Gifhorn)	Gifhorn district	2720
BR 054	Weper	Northeim district	200
BR 072	Lammer Holz	City of Brunswick	25
BR 075	Barnbruch	City of Wolfsburg 630 ha Gifhorn district 570 ha	1200
BR 078	Steinberg	Osterode district	12
BR 080	Staufenberg	Osterode district	157.9
BR 118	Braunschweiger Okeraue	City of Brunswick	320
BR 124	Oderaue	Landkreise Osterode and Northeim	510
BR 140	Wurmberg	Goslar district	183
HA 024	Dümmer	Diepholz district 552.5 ha Vechta district 160 ha Osnabrück district 32.5 ha	745
HA 214	Ith	Hameln-Pyrmont district 1962 ha, Holzminden district 753 ha	2715
HA 215	Mühlenberg	Schaumburg district	4,7
LÜ 002	Lüneburg Heath	Harburg district 10214.9 ha Soltau-Fallingbostel district 13222 ha	23436.9
LÜ 009	Kalkberg	Lüneburg district	7.6
LÜ 010	Brunsberg	Harburg district	60.6
LÜ 027	Bullensee	Rotenburg (Wümme) district	32
LÜ 098	Meißendorf Lakes and Bannetze Moor	Celle district	815
LÜ 134	Großes Moor (near Becklingen)	Celle district 666 ha Soltau-Fallingbostel district 184 ha	850
LÜ 168	Maujahn Moor	Lüchow-Dannenberg district	37
LÜ 170	Bornrieth Moor	Celle district	115
LÜ 185	Grundloses Moor	Heidekreis	295
LÜ 190	Kiehnmoor	Uelzen district 340 ha Celle district 100 ha	440
LÜ 212	Central Lüß Plateau Heaths	Celle district	293
LÜ 252	Tiste Bauernmoor	Rotenburg (Wümme) district	570
LÜ 277	Lutter	Celle district 1937.6 ha, Gifhorn district 497.7 ha	2435
LÜ 287	Lachte	Celle district 364 ha, Town of Celle 125 ha	489
WE 003	Darnsee	Osnabrück district	11
WE 241	Heidfeld	Schüttorf (Samtgemeinde)	200
WE 247	Steinberg	Emsland district	24

== Sources ==
- Ulrich Sippel: Stand der Ausweisung von Naturschutzgebieten in Niedersachsen. Hannover 2005, 127 pages. Aus Informationsdienst Naturschutz Niedersachsen ISSN 0934-7135. Niedersächsischer Landesbetrieb für Wasserwirtschaft, Küsten- und Naturschutz (NLWKN)
