= Wiedau =

River in Germany

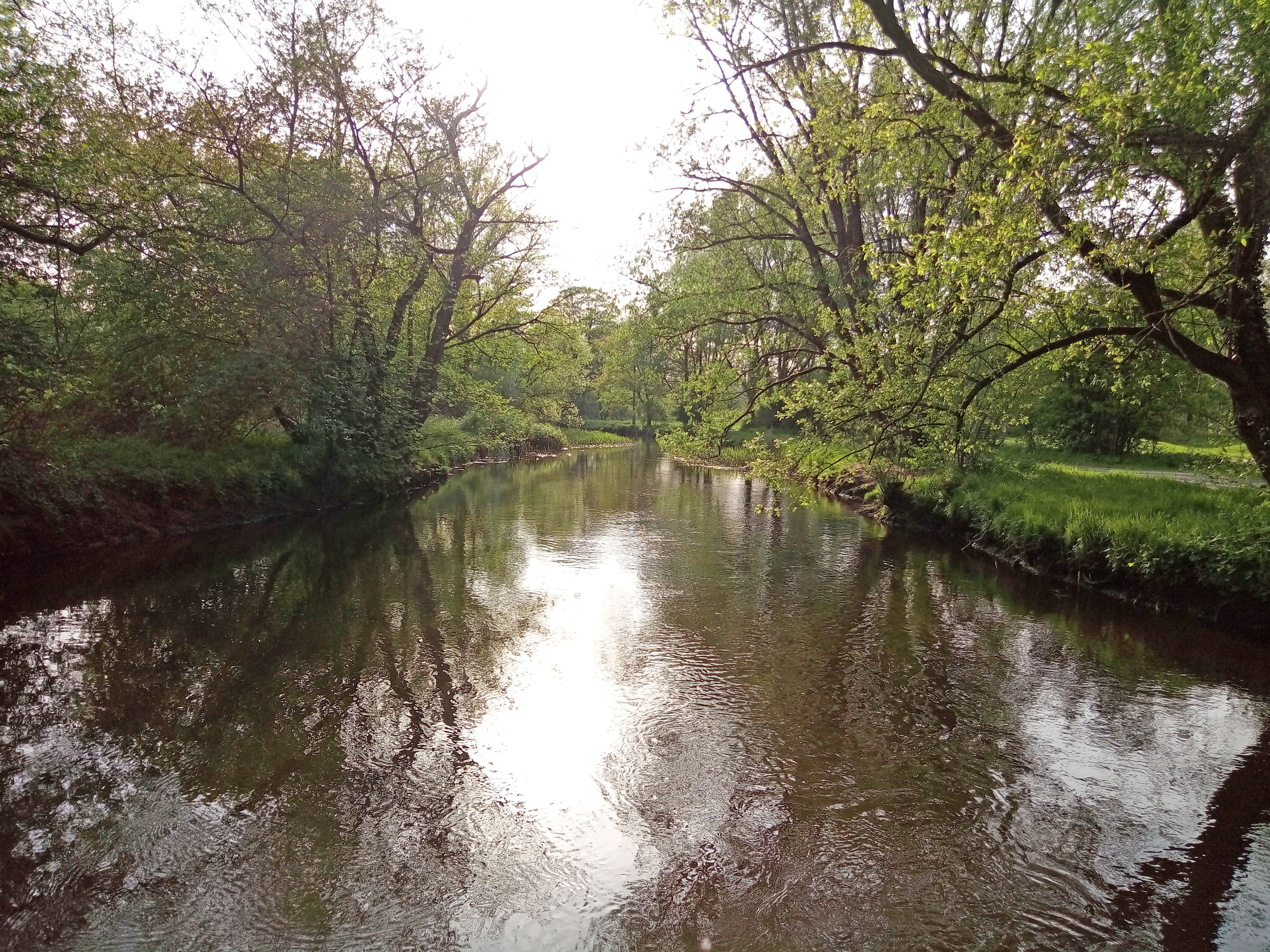
- The Wiedau in Rotenburg

Location
- Country: Germany
- State: Lower Saxony

Physical characteristics
- Source
  - location: confluence of the Hahnenbach and Mehlandsbach near Bellen (a district of Brockel)
  - coordinates: 53°03′50″N 9°34′21″E
  - elevation: 33 m
- Mouth
  - location: near Rotenburg into the Wümme
  - coordinates: 53°06′26″N 9°23′25″E
  - elevation: 18 m
- Length: 14.2 km (8.8 mi) (including the river Mehlandsbach: 27.4 km (17.0 mi))
- Basin size: 307 km^{2} (119 sq mi)
- Discharge
  - average: ca. 3.0 m^{3}/s (110 cu ft/s); before it joins the Rodau: 1.6 m^{3}/s (57 cu ft/s)

Basin features
- Progression: Wümme→ Lesum→ Weser→ North Sea
- Landmarks: Small towns: Rotenburg; Villages: Bothel, Hemsbünde

Wiedau is a river of Lower Saxony, Germany. It is a left-hand tributary of the Wümme.

The Wiedau begins near Bellen (a district of Brockel) in the vicinity of Hemslingen in the district of at the confluence of the Hahnenbach and the Mehlandsbach. In the area the Samtgemeinde Bothel, it flows through a densely wooded and near natural depression. It discharges into the Wümme in Rotenburg shortly after being joined by the only slightly smaller Rodau.

== Water sport ==
The Wiedau is popular with anglers and canoeists. At high water, the Wiedau can be navigated from the road bridge in Bellen near Hemslingen to its mouth on the Wümme by small kayaks, a distance of 23 km (14 mi).

== See also ==
- List of rivers of Lower Saxony
