= Achim-Verden Geest =

Coordinates: 52.9983°N 9.2933°E

The Achim-Verden Geest (German: Achim-Verdener Geest) is part of the Stade Geest. Its main part is in the northeast of the German state of Lower Saxony, a smaller part in the state of Bremen.

== Geography ==
The Achim-Verden Geest is an area of sandy terrain, which stretches along River Weser between the cities of Verden an der Aller, Achim and Bremen. It lies in the south of Elbe–Weser triangle. It borders in the north on the Wümme Depression and in the east on the Lüneburg Heath.

== Towns and villages ==
- Achim
- Ahausen
- Bremen
- Kirchlinteln
- Kirchwalsede
- Langwedel
- Oyten
- Westerwalsede
- Verden an der Aller
