= Glinde =

Glinde may refer to several places in Germany:

- Glinde, Schleswig-Holstein, a town in Schleswig-Holstein
- Glinde, Saxony-Anhalt, part of the town Barby, district of Salzlandkreis, Saxony-Anhalt
- a part of the village Oerel, itself part of the Samtgemeinde Geestequelle, district of Rotenburg, Lower Saxony
- a part of Bad Oldesloe, Schleswig-Holstein

See also: Glynde
