= Kalbe =

Kalbe may refer to:

- Kalbe, Saxony-Anhalt, town in Altmarkkreis Salzwedel, Saxony-Anhalt, Germany
- Kalbe, Lower Saxony, municipality in Rotenburg, Lower Saxony, Germany
- Kalbe (Meißner), mountain in Hesse, Germany
- Kalbe Farma, pharmaceutical company in North Jakarta, Indonesia

== See also ==
- Calbe, town in Salzlandkreis, Saxony-Anhalt, Germany
