= Rodau (Wümme) =

River in Germany

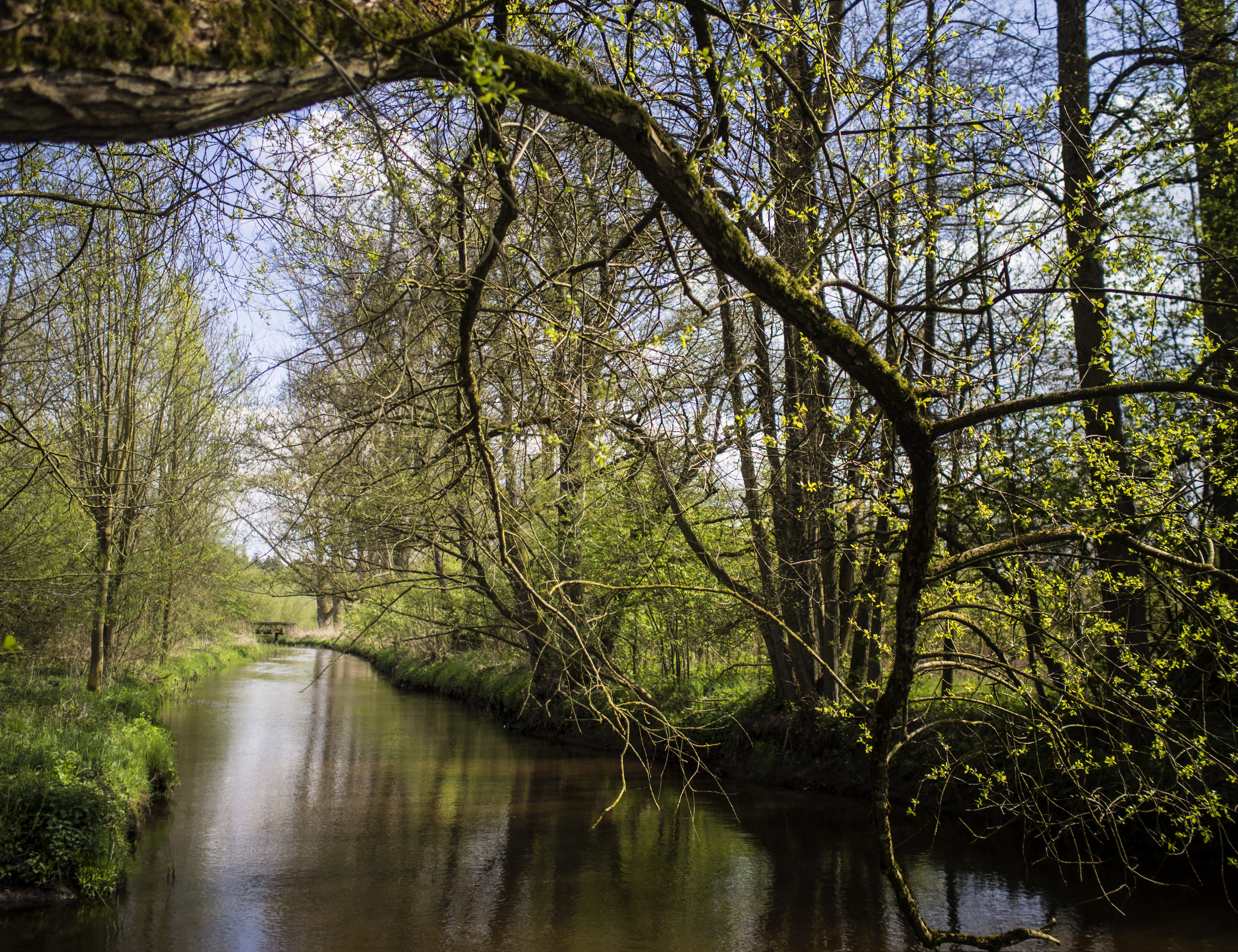

Location
- Country: Germany
- State: Lower Saxony

Physical characteristics
- Source
  - location: in Hiddingen near Visselhövede
  - coordinates: 53°06′03″N 9°24′19″E
  - elevation: 60 m
- Mouth
  - location: near Rotenburg an der Wümme into the Wiedau
  - coordinates: 53°06′26″N 9°23′25″E
  - elevation: 19.5 m
- Length: 21.4 km (13.3 mi)
- Basin size: 142 km^{2} (55 sq mi)
- Discharge
  - average: 1.4 m^{3}/s (49 cu ft/s)

Basin features
- Progression: Wiedau→ Wümme→ Lesum→ Weser→ North Sea
- Landmarks: Small towns: Rotenburg an der Wümme; Villages: Bothel

Rodau is a river of Lower Saxony, Germany. It is a left-hand tributary of the Wiedau.

The Rodau rises near Hiddingen, a borough of Visselhövede, in the district of Rotenburg an der Wümme at the foot of a 50-metre-thick (160 ft) ridge of end moraine that falls away to the northwest and dates to the Drenthe stage of the Saale glaciation. The river then crosses the densely wooded and near-natural Rosebruch in the area of the Samtgemeinde Bothel and discharges into the Wiedau at Rotenburg an der Wümme, before the Wiedau in turn enters the Wümme after only 1.3 kilometres (0.81 mi).

The Vissel joins the Rodau near Bothel. This stream rises in Visselhövede in one of the biggest springs in the Lower Saxon Plain and, at its mouth, carries around 25% more water than the Rodau, hence it is actually the main headstream of the Rodau.

== Water sport ==
The Rodau is a popular area with anglers and canoeists.

== See also ==
- List of rivers of Lower Saxony
