= Tiste Bauernmoor =

Nature reserve in Lower Saxony, Germany

Coordinates: 53°16′06.10″N 9°34′14.78″E

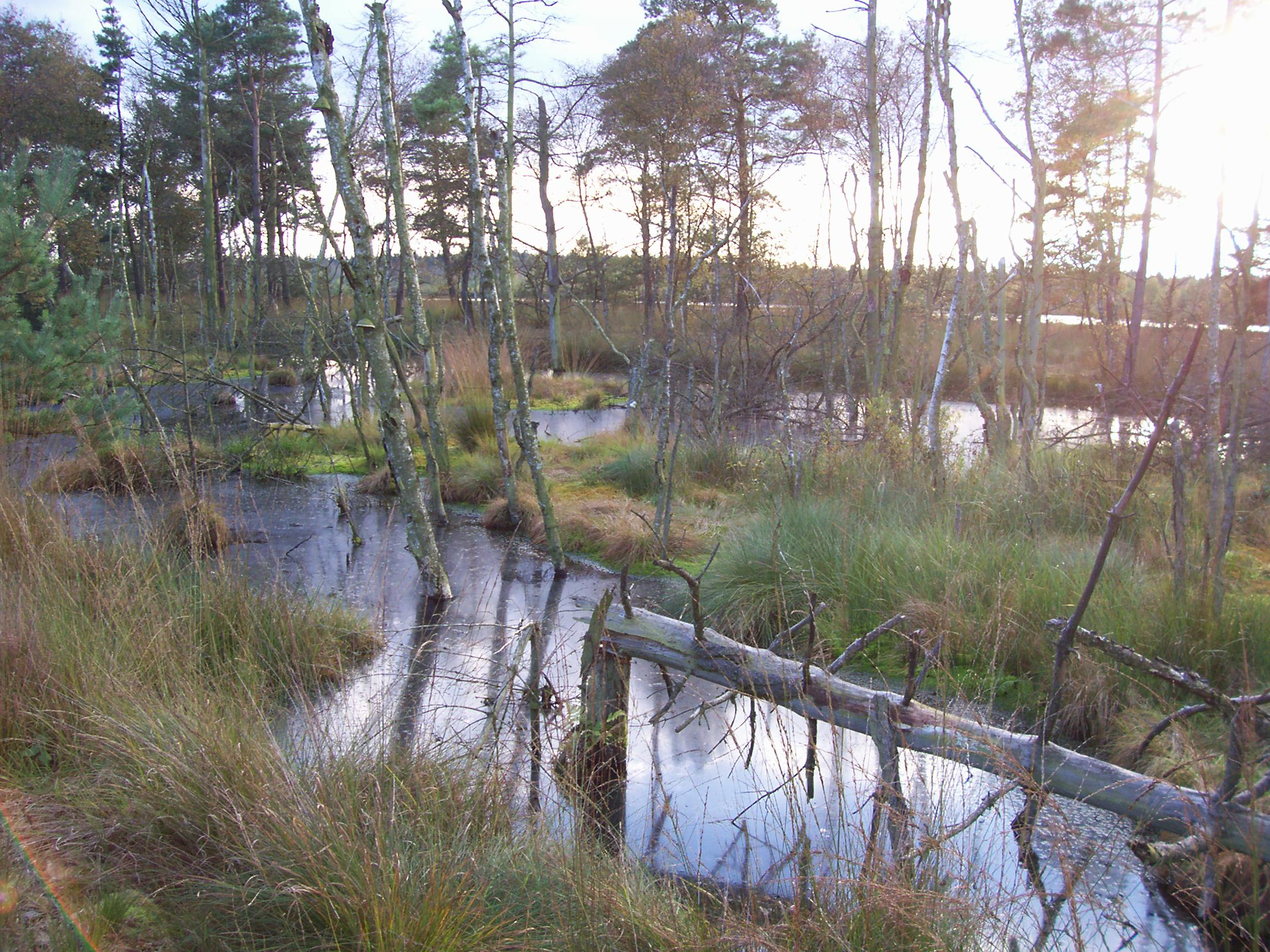
The Tiste Bauernmoor

The Tiste Bauernmoor (German: Tister Bauernmoor) is an area of raised bog on the Lüneburg Heath in north Germany that was designated as a nature reserve on 2 May 2002. It has an area of 570 hectares (1,400 acres) and belongs, together with the Ekelmoor, Avensermoor and Everstofer Moor, to the large Ekelmoor moorland region that has a total area of 1,220 hectares (3,000 acres).

== Location ==
The Tiste Bauernmoor lies near the village of Tiste from where it gets its name. Tiste is part of the collective municipality known as Samtgemeinde Sittensen in the district of Rotenburg in Lower Saxony. The moor is part of the Wümme Valley natural region.

== Renaturisation ==
Much of the moor was used for industrial peat-cutting. The northern part of the moor was converted to pasture, but is no longer farmed. In order to renaturalise it about a third of the nature reserve was re-flooded. The areas that were overgrown with Weymouth pines were cleared. These areas now form breeding grounds and staging areas for many species of bird, some of them rare. The nature reserve's terrain falls almost entirely within the European Union bird reserve of Sittensen Moor (Moore bei Sittensen). The district of Rotenburg (Wümme) acts as the local nature reserve authority.

== Flora and fauna ==
The crane has resettled in the area and now breeds here. In late autumn several thousand cranes rest on the moor before flying on to their winter quarters. This makes the Tiste Bauernmoor one of the most important sites for cranes on the Northwest German Plain. Other rare birds such as the sea eagle and the osprey have been seen here. The following birds of prey have also been observed on the moor: hobby, peregrine, merlin, marsh harrier, hen harrier, Montagu's harrier, red kite, black kite, European honey buzzard and rough-legged buzzard. In addition there is evidence that the following have bred here, or at least have been seen during the breeding season: Short-eared owl, great grey shrike, teal, garganey, shoveler, black stork, snipe, peewit, nightjar, grasshopper warbler, stonechat, whinchat and red-backed shrike. The list of residents runs to more than 40 species.

Due to the low level of nutrients, the acidic pH value of the water and the perpetually waterlogged terrain, a highly specialised plant environment has developed in the Tiste Bauernmoor. Dwarf-shrub heathland is found here together with cottongrass and peat moss or Sphagnum. Sundews, a form of carnivorous plant, also thrive here.

== Tourism ==
The moor can be visited using a former peat railway. The journey, with detailed explanations about the cutting of peat, lasts an hour. There is also a footpath into the area. A six-metre-high (20-foot) observation tower on the moor offers the opportunity to observe the bird life.
