= Vissel =

River in Germany

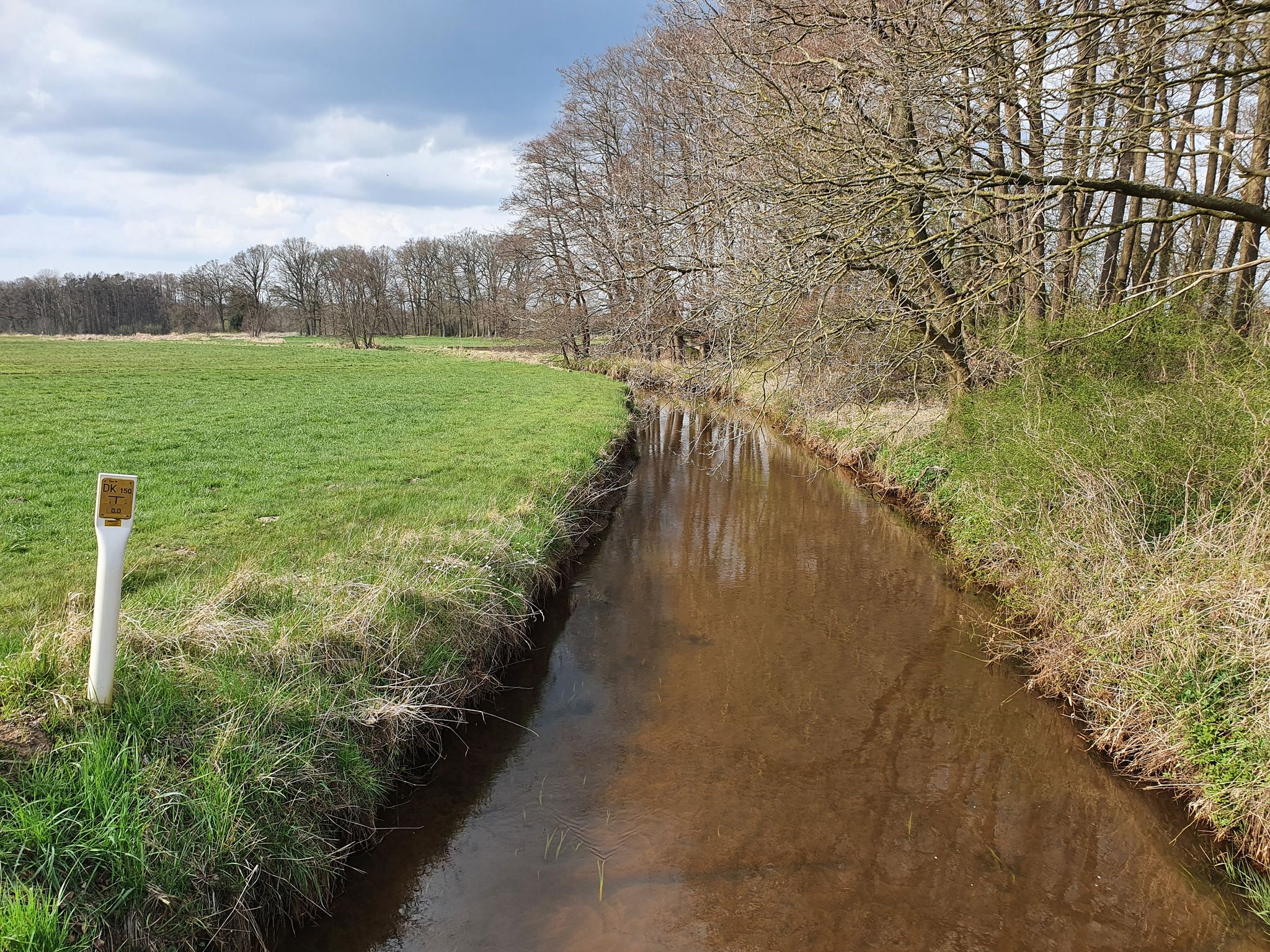

Location
- Country: Germany
- State: Lower Saxony
- District: Rotenburg

Physical characteristics
- Source
  - location: in Visselhövede
  - coordinates: 52°59′07″N 9°34′37″E
- Mouth
  - location: southwest of Bothel into the Rodau
  - coordinates: 53°03′37″N 9°29′26″E
- Length: 11.8 km (7.3 mi)

Basin features
- Progression: Rodau→ Wiedau→ Wümme→ Lesum→ Weser→ North Sea

Vissel (also Visselbach) is a stream in Lower Saxony, Germany, on the Lüneburg Heath. The Vissel rises at Visselhövede and flows into the Rodau southwest of Bothel.

== See also ==
- List of rivers of Lower Saxony
