= Bothel =

Bothel may refer to:

- Bothel, Cumbria in England
- Bothel, Lower Saxony in Germany
- Bothel (Samtgemeinde), a collective municipality around the German village Bothel
- Bothell, Washington in the United States
