= Vahlde =

- Municipality
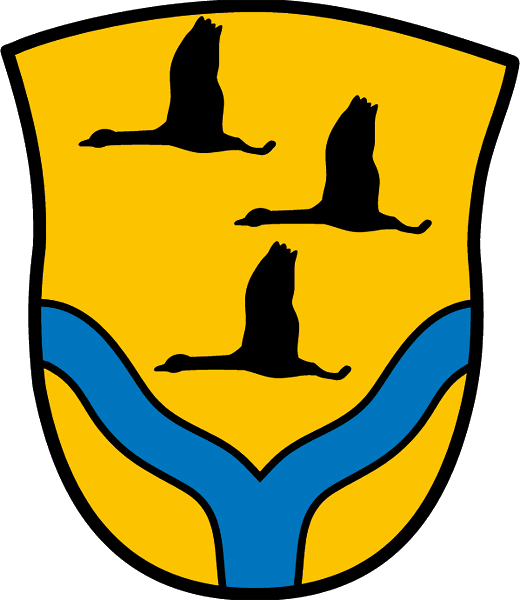
- Coat of arms

- Location of Vahlde within Rotenburg (Wümme) district
- Interactive map of Vahlde
- Location within Germany Location within Lower Saxony
- Coordinates: 53°11′05″N 09°37′52″E
- Country: Germany
- State: Lower Saxony
- District: Rotenburg (Wümme)
- Municipal assoc.: Fintel
- Subdivisions: 3

Government
  - Mayor: Artur Behrens

Area
  - Total: 17.53 km^{2} (6.77 sq mi)
- Elevation: 38 m (125 ft)

Population (2025-12-31)
  - Total: 703
  - Density: 40.1/km^{2} (104/sq mi)
- Time zone: UTC+01:00 (CET)
  - Summer (DST): UTC+02:00 (CEST)
- Postal codes: 27389
- Dialling codes: 04265, 04267
- Vehicle registration: ROW
- Website: www.fintel.de

Vahlde is a municipality in the district of Rotenburg, in Lower Saxony, Germany.

== Description and history ==
In 1180 Vahlde was first mentioned in a document of the Prince-Bishop of Verden. In 1648 the Prince-Bishopric was transformed into the Principality of Verden, which was first ruled in personal union by the Swedish Crown – interrupted by a Danish occupation (1712–1715) – and from 1715 on by the Hanoverian Crown. In 1807 the ephemeric Kingdom of Westphalia annexed the Principality, before France annexed it in 1810. In 1813 the Principality was restored to the Electorate of Hanover, which – after its upgrade to the Kingdom of Hanover in 1814 – incorporated the Principality in a real union and the Princely territory, including Vahlde, became part of the new Stade Region, established in 1823.

== Coat of arms ==
The coat of arms shows the silhouettes of three flying birds, symbolising the three subdivisions of the municipality. The blue lines under them, uniting in the bottom center, show the unification of the rivers Fintau and Ruschwede near the main village Vahlde.
