= Burgsittensen Moor Railway =

Railway in Germany

Coordinates: 53.2794°N 9.5672°E

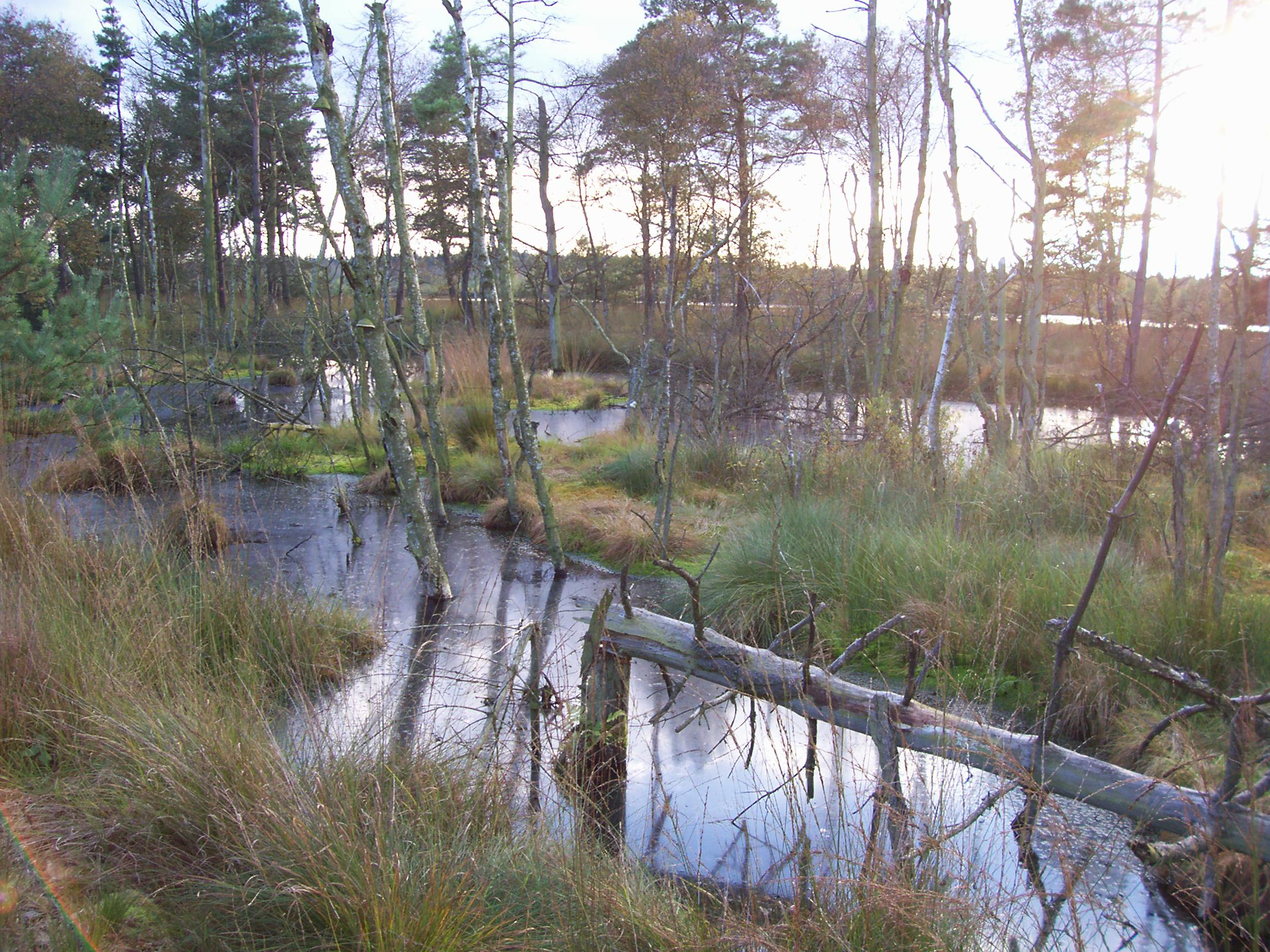
Tiste Moor area

The Burgsittensen Moor Railway (German: Moorbahn Burgsittensen) is a 600 mm (1 ft 11 5/8 in) narrow gauge light railway or Feldbahn, which is based on an old peat line near Tiste on the Lüneburg Heath in North Germany.

It worked from 1931 to the end of 1999, when the last peat-cutting licence in Tiste ran out. The licence permitted the cutting of peat which was then used inter alia for fuel. Because, by then, the Moor Railway line had become very much part of the village's history, a society was formed, the Moorbahn Burgsittensen, in order to preserve this piece of technical history for posterity. Today the little, narrow gauge line has become a magnet for tourists. Led by expert guides, groups are taken by rail to an observation tower with an overview of the boggy terrain known as the Tiste Bauernmoor. There is also a footpath to the hide, but there are no guided tours on foot.
