= Hahnenbach (Wiedau) =

River in Germany

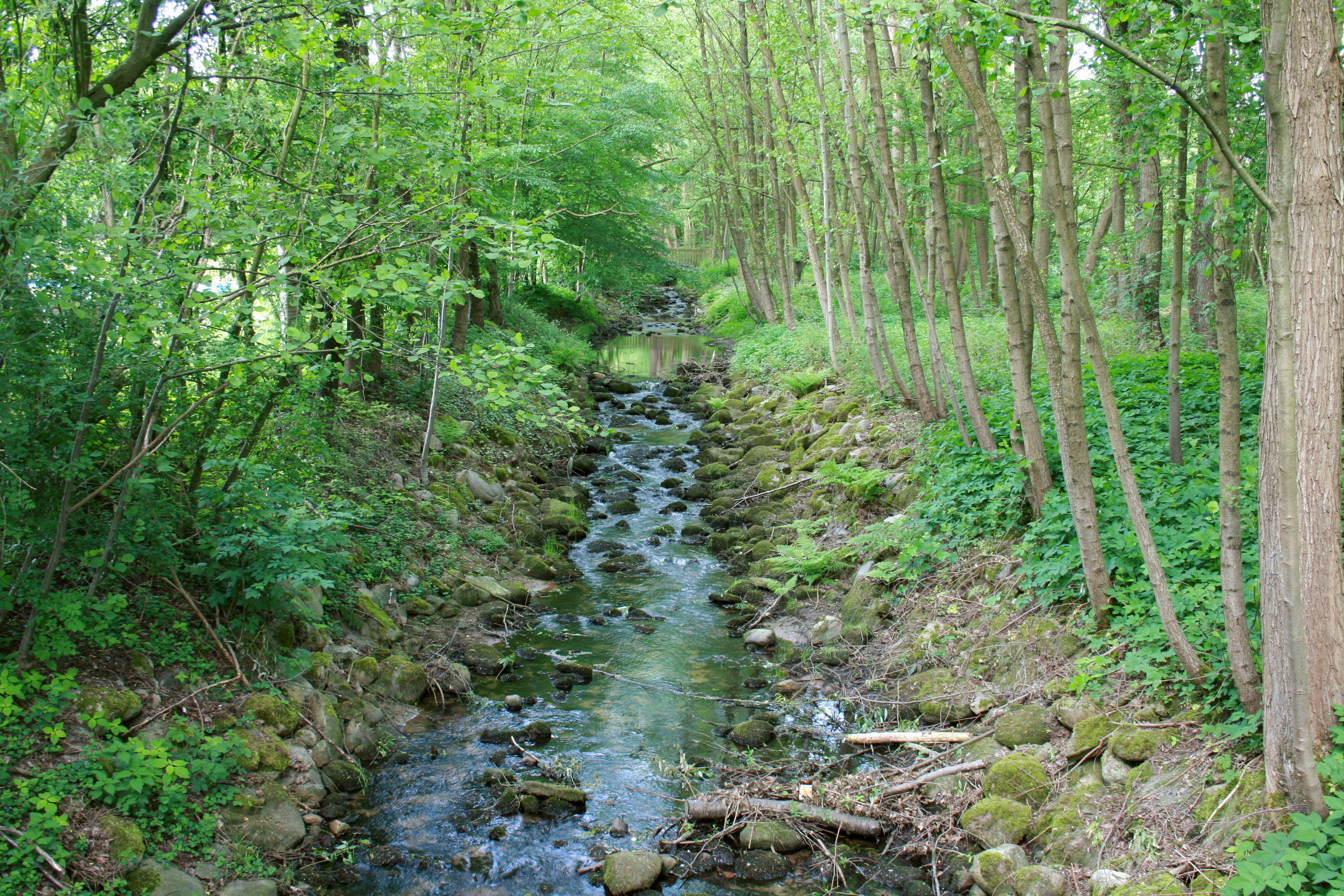

Location
- Country: Germany
- State: Lower Saxony

Physical characteristics
- Mouth: Wiedau
  - coordinates: 53.0639°N 9.5725°E
- Length: 17.6 km (10.9 mi)

Basin features
- Progression: Wiedau→ Wümme→ Lesum→ Weser→ North Sea

Hahnenbach is a river of Lower Saxony, Germany. It flows into the Wiedau near Hemslingen.

== See also ==
- List of rivers of Lower Saxony
