= Ebersdorf =

Ebersdorf may refer to the following places:

- Ebersdorf bei Coburg, in the district of Coburg, Bavaria, Germany
- Ebersdorf, Lower Saxony, in the district of Rotenburg, Lower Saxony, Germany
- Ebersdorf, Saalburg-Ebersdorf, a village in the town of Saalburg-Ebersdorf, Thuringia, Germany
- Ebersdorf, Austria, in the district of Hartberg, Styria, Austria

== See also ==
- Kaiserebersdorf, a former municipality, since 1982 a district of Vienna, Austria
- Kaiserebersdorf Castle, which has served at various times as a fortress, a Habsburg hunting lodge, and a prison
