= Fintel (Samtgemeinde) =

- Samtgemeinde
- Location of Fintel within Rotenburg district
- Interactive map of Fintel
- Location within Germany Location within Lower Saxony
- Country: Germany
- State: Lower Saxony
- District: Rotenburg
- Seat: Lauenbrück
- Subdivisions: 5 municipalities

Area
  - Total: 122.3 km^{2} (47.2 sq mi)

Population (2025-12-31)
  - Total: 8,014
  - Density: 65.53/km^{2} (169.7/sq mi)
- Time zone: UTC+01:00 (CET)
  - Summer (DST): UTC+02:00 (CEST)
- Website: www.sgfintel.de

Fintel is a Samtgemeinde ("collective municipality") in the district of Rotenburg, in Lower Saxony, Germany. Its seat is in the village Lauenbrück.

The Samtgemeinde Fintel consists of the following municipalities:

1. Fintel
2. Helvesiek
3. Lauenbrück
4. Stemmen
5. Vahlde
