= Rhade =

- Municipality
- Coat of arms

- Location of Rhade within Rotenburg district
- Interactive map of Rhade
- Location within Germany Location within Lower Saxony
- Coordinates: 53°19′44″N 09°06′56″E
- Country: Germany
- State: Lower Saxony
- District: Rotenburg
- Municipal assoc.: Selsingen
- Subdivisions: 2

Government
  - Mayor: Thomas Czekalla

Area
  - Total: 24.56 km^{2} (9.48 sq mi)
- Elevation: 13 m (43 ft)

Population (2025-12-31)
  - Total: 1,012
  - Density: 41.21/km^{2} (106.7/sq mi)
- Time zone: UTC+01:00 (CET)
  - Summer (DST): UTC+02:00 (CEST)
- Postal codes: 27404
- Dialling codes: 04285
- Vehicle registration: ROW

Rhade (German pronunciation: [ˈʁaːdə]) is a municipality in the district of Rotenburg, in Lower Saxony, Germany.

Rhade belonged — as to its government — to the Prince-Archbishopric of Bremen, established in 1180. In religious respect, however, Rhade formed part of the Roman Catholic Diocese of Verden until after 1566 its incumbent bishops lost papal recognition, except of a last Catholic bishop from 1630 to 1631, respectively. In 1648 the Prince-Archbishopric was transformed into the Duchy of Bremen, which was first ruled in personal union by the Swedish Crown - interrupted by a Danish occupation (1712–1715) - and from 1715 on by the Hanoverian Crown. In 1807 the ephemeric Kingdom of Westphalia annexed the Duchy, before France annexed it in 1810. In 1813 the Duchy was restored to the Electorate of Hanover, which - after its upgrade to the Kingdom of Hanover in 1814 - incorporated the Duchy in a real union and the Ducal territory, including Rhade, became part of the new Stade Region, established in 1823.
