= Selsingen (Samtgemeinde) =

Municipality in Lower Saxony, Germany

- Samtgemeinde
- Location of Selsingen within Rotenburg district
- Interactive map of Selsingen
- Location within Germany Location within Lower Saxony
- Country: Germany
- State: Lower Saxony
- District: Rotenburg
- Seat: Selsingen
- Subdivisions: 8 municipalities

Area
  - Total: 227.06 km^{2} (87.67 sq mi)

Population (2025-12-31)
  - Total: 9,060
  - Density: 39.9/km^{2} (103/sq mi)
- Time zone: UTC+01:00 (CET)
  - Summer (DST): UTC+02:00 (CEST)
- Website: www.selsingen.de

Selsingen is a Samtgemeinde ("collective municipality") in the district of Rotenburg, in Lower Saxony, Germany. Its seat is in the village Selsingen.

The Samtgemeinde Selsingen consists of the following municipalities:

- Anderlingen
- Deinstedt
- Farven
- Ostereistedt
- Rhade
- Sandbostel
- Seedorf
- Selsingen
