= Deinstedt =

- Municipality
- Flag Coat of arms

- Location of Deinstedt within Rotenburg (Wümme) district
- Interactive map of Deinstedt
- Location within Germany Location within Lower Saxony
- Coordinates: 53°24′57″N 09°13′28″E
- Country: Germany
- State: Lower Saxony
- District: Rotenburg (Wümme)
- Municipal assoc.: Selsingen
- Subdivisions: 2

Government
  - Mayor: Bruno Eybe

Area
  - Total: 20.27 km^{2} (7.83 sq mi)
- Elevation: 14 m (46 ft)

Population (2025-12-31)
  - Total: 620
  - Density: 31/km^{2} (79/sq mi)
- Time zone: UTC+01:00 (CET)
  - Summer (DST): UTC+02:00 (CEST)
- Postal codes: 27446
- Dialling codes: 04284, 04762
- Vehicle registration: ROW

Deinstedt (German pronunciation: [ˈdaɪnʃtɛt]; Low German: Deins) is a municipality in the district of Rotenburg, in Lower Saxony, Germany.

Deinstedt belonged to the Prince-Archbishopric of Bremen, established in 1180. In 1648 the Prince-Archbishopric was transformed into the Duchy of Bremen, which was first ruled in personal union by the Swedish Crown – interrupted by a Danish occupation (1712–1715) – and from 1715 on by the Hanoverian Crown. In 1807 the ephemeral Kingdom of Westphalia annexed the Duchy, before France annexed it in 1810. In 1813 the Duchy was restored to the Electorate of Hanover, which – after its upgrade to the Kingdom of Hanover in 1814 – incorporated the Duchy in a real union and the Ducal territory, including Deinstedt, became part of the new Stade Region, established in 1823.
