= Sandbostel =

- Municipality
- Coat of arms

- Location of Sandbostel within Rotenburg (Wümme) district
- Interactive map of Sandbostel
- Location within Germany Location within Lower Saxony
- Coordinates: 53°24′34″N 09°07′50″E
- Country: Germany
- State: Lower Saxony
- District: Rotenburg (Wümme)
- Municipal assoc.: Selsingen
- Subdivisions: 4

Government
  - Mayor: Michael Behnken (Ind.)

Area
  - Total: 31.54 km^{2} (12.18 sq mi)
- Elevation: 8 m (26 ft)

Population (2025-12-31)
  - Total: 780
  - Density: 25/km^{2} (64/sq mi)
- Time zone: UTC+01:00 (CET)
  - Summer (DST): UTC+02:00 (CEST)
- Postal codes: 27446
- Dialling codes: 04284, 04764
- Vehicle registration: ROW, BRV
- Website: www.selsingen.de

Sandbostel is a municipality in Lower Saxony (Niedersachsen) in northwestern Germany, 43 km north-east of Bremen, 60 km west of Hamburg. It is part of the Samtgemeinde Selsingen. In 2024, it had 799 inhabitants. The Oste flows through the municipality.

== History ==
Sandbostel belonged to the Prince-Archbishopric of Bremen, established in 1180. In 1648, the Prince-Archbishopric was transformed into the Duchy of Bremen, which was first ruled in personal union by the Swedish Crown - interrupted by a Danish occupation (1712–1715) - and from 1715 on by the Hanoverian Crown. In 1807, the ephemeric Kingdom of Westphalia annexed the Duchy, before France annexed it in 1810. In 1813, the Duchy was restored to the Electorate of Hanover, which - after its upgrade to the Kingdom of Hanover in 1814 - incorporated the Duchy in a real union and the Ducal territory, including Sandbostel, became part of the new Stade Region, established in 1823.

In 1932, during the Great Depression the Lutheran Church of the State of Hanover opened a camp for workless singles, employed in public works (roadworks, amelioration) near Sandbostel.

In 1939, the Sandbostel camp, meanwhile taken over by the Nazi trade union Reichsarbeitsdienst, was converted into the Prisoner-of-war camp Stalag X-B and a camp of internment for civilian enemy aliens. Until 1945 about a million inmates passed through the camp. Estimates of the number of deaths vary between 8,000 and around 50,000. A couple of the original camp buildings still exist in the commercial estate Immenheim. The cemetery in which several thousand prisoners are buried in mass graves is located just outside the town. There is a memorial to them.
