= Vierden =

- Municipality
- Location of Vierden within Rotenburg (Wümme) district
- Interactive map of Vierden
- Location within Germany Location within Lower Saxony
- Coordinates: 53°19′43″N 09°30′31″E
- Country: Germany
- State: Lower Saxony
- District: Rotenburg (Wümme)
- Municipal assoc.: Sittensen
- Subdivisions: 5

Government
  - Mayor: Harald Schmitchen (CDU)

Area
  - Total: 21.34 km^{2} (8.24 sq mi)
- Elevation: 34 m (112 ft)

Population (2025-12-31)
  - Total: 770
  - Density: 36/km^{2} (93/sq mi)
- Time zone: UTC+01:00 (CET)
  - Summer (DST): UTC+02:00 (CEST)
- Postal codes: 27419
- Dialling codes: 04169, 04282
- Vehicle registration: ROW
- Website: www.vierden.de

Vierden (German pronunciation: [ˈfiːɐ̯dn̩]) is a municipality in the district of Rotenburg, in Lower Saxony, Germany.

Vierden belonged to the Prince-Archbishopric of Bremen, established in 1180. In 1648, the Prince-Archbishopric was transformed into the Duchy of Bremen, which was first ruled in personal union by the Swedish Crown - interrupted by a Danish occupation (1712–1715) - and from 1715 onwards by the Hanoverian Crown. In 1807, the ephemeral Kingdom of Westphalia annexed the Duchy, before France later annexed it in 1810. In 1813, the Duchy was restored to the Electorate of Hanover which, after its upgrade to the Kingdom of Hanover in 1814, incorporated the Duchy into a real union. As a result, the Ducal territory, including Vierden, became part of the new Stade Region, established in 1823.
