= Stemmen =

- Municipality
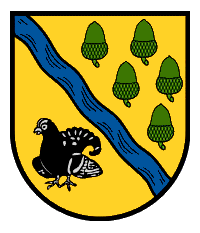
- Coat of arms

- Location of Stemmen within Rotenburg (Wümme) district
- Interactive map of Stemmen
- Location within Germany Location within Lower Saxony
- Coordinates: 53°13′N 09°33′E
- Country: Germany
- State: Lower Saxony
- District: Rotenburg (Wümme)
- Municipal assoc.: Fintel

Government
  - Mayor: Reinhard Trau

Area
  - Total: 24.73 km^{2} (9.55 sq mi)
- Elevation: 29 m (95 ft)

Population (2025-12-31)
  - Total: 799
  - Density: 32.3/km^{2} (83.7/sq mi)
- Time zone: UTC+01:00 (CET)
  - Summer (DST): UTC+02:00 (CEST)
- Postal codes: 27389
- Dialling codes: 04267
- Vehicle registration: ROW

Stemmen (German pronunciation: [ˈʃtɛmən]) is a municipality in the district of Rotenburg, in Lower Saxony, Germany.

Stemmen belonged to the Prince-Bishopric of Verden, established in 1180. In 1648 the Prince-Bishopric was transformed into the Principality of Verden, which was first ruled in personal union by the Swedish Crown - interrupted by a Danish occupation (1712–1715) - and from 1715 on by the Hanoverian Crown. In 1807 the ephemeric Kingdom of Westphalia annexed the Principality, before France annexed it in 1810. In 1813 the Principality was restored to the Electorate of Hanover, which - after its upgrade to the Kingdom of Hanover in 1814 - incorporated the Principality in a real union and the Princely territory, including Stemmen, became part of the new Stade Region, established in 1823.
