= Selsingen =

- Municipality
- Coat of arms

- Location of Selsingen within Rotenburg (Wümme) district
- Interactive map of Selsingen
- Location within Germany Location within Lower Saxony
- Coordinates: 53°22′N 09°13′E
- Country: Germany
- State: Lower Saxony
- District: Rotenburg (Wümme)
- Municipal assoc.: Selsingen
- Subdivisions: 6

Government
  - Mayor: Bernd Schleßelmann (CDU)

Area
  - Total: 41.86 km^{2} (16.16 sq mi)
- Elevation: 27 m (89 ft)

Population (2025-12-31)
  - Total: 3,579
  - Density: 85.50/km^{2} (221.4/sq mi)
- Time zone: UTC+01:00 (CET)
  - Summer (DST): UTC+02:00 (CEST)
- Postal codes: 27446
- Dialling codes: 04284
- Vehicle registration: ROW

Selsingen is a municipality in the district of Rotenburg, in Lower Saxony, Germany. It is situated approximately 15 kilometres (9.3 mi) southeast of Bremervörde, and 45 kilometres (28 mi) northeast of Bremen, and is twinned with the English village of Sawston in Cambridgeshire.

Selsingen was under the secular governance of the Prince-Archbishopric of Bremen, established in 1180. However, in respect to religious governance, Selsingen formed part of the Roman Catholic Diocese of Verden. In 1648 the Prince-Archbishopric was transformed into the Duchy of Bremen, which was first ruled in personal union by the Swedish and from 1715 on by the Hanoverian Crown. In 1823 the Duchy was abolished and its territory became part of the Stade Region.

Selsingen is also the seat of the Samtgemeinde ("collective municipality") Selsingen.
