= Sittensen =

- Municipality
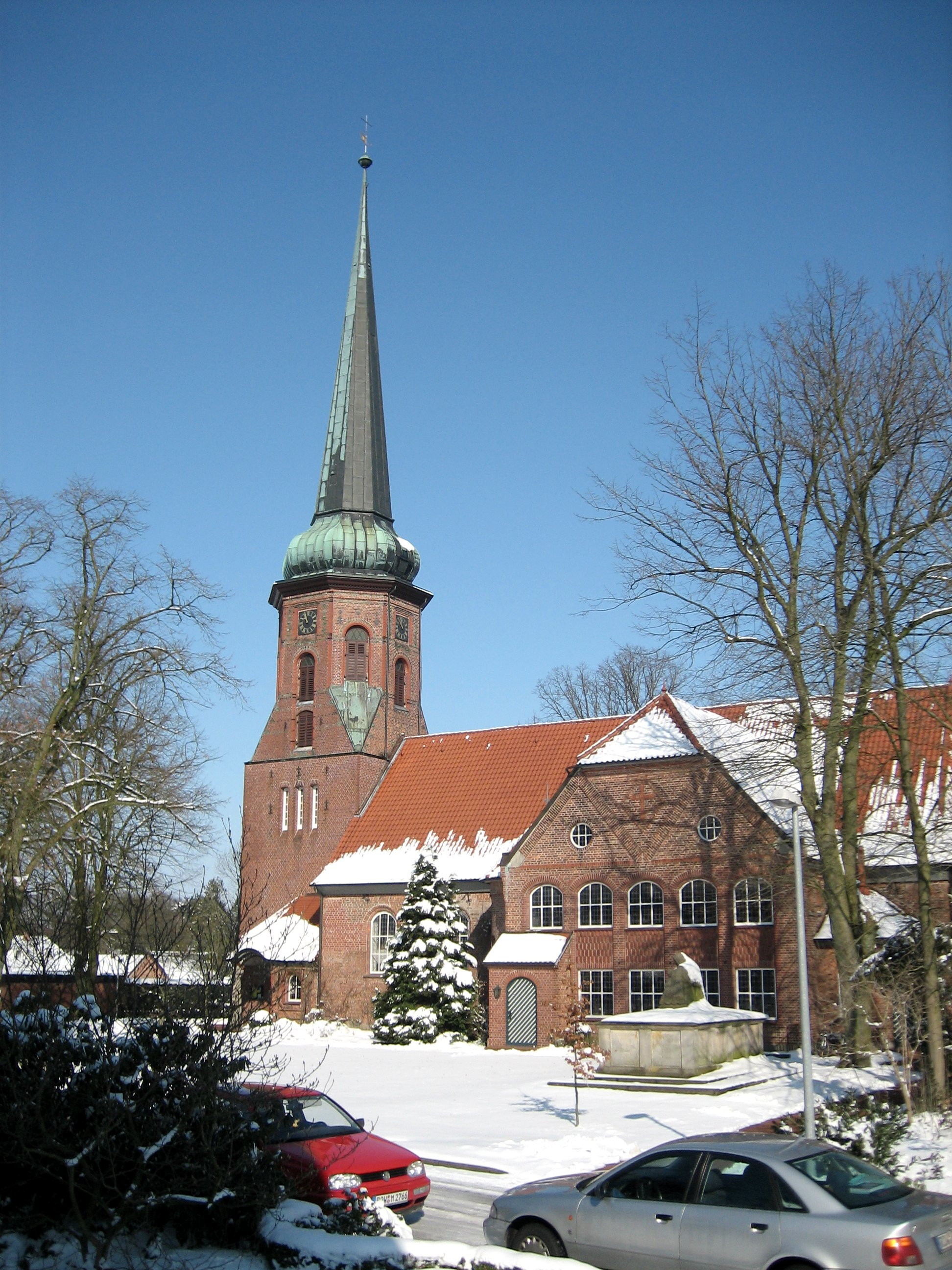
- The St. Dionysius church of Sittensen on a winter day.

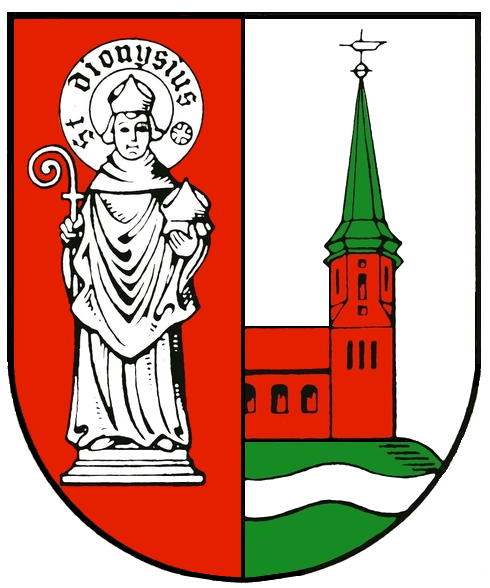
- Coat of arms

- Location of Sittensen within Rotenburg (Wümme) district
- Interactive map of Sittensen
- Location within Germany Location within Lower Saxony
- Coordinates: 53°17′N 09°30′E
- Country: Germany
- State: Lower Saxony
- District: Rotenburg (Wümme)
- Municipal assoc.: Sittensen

Government
  - Mayor: Diedrich Höyns (SPD)

Area
  - Total: 18.55 km^{2} (7.16 sq mi)
- Elevation: 31 m (102 ft)

Population (2025-12-31)
  - Total: 6,264
  - Density: 337.7/km^{2} (874.6/sq mi)
- Time zone: UTC+01:00 (CET)
  - Summer (DST): UTC+02:00 (CEST)
- Postal codes: 27419
- Dialling codes: 04282
- Vehicle registration: ROW or BRV
- Website: www.sittensen.de

Sittensen is a municipality in the district of Rotenburg, in Lower Saxony, Germany. It is situated approximately 20 km northeast of Rotenburg, and 45 km southwest of Hamburg.

Sittensen belonged - as to its government - to the Prince-Archbishopric of Bremen, established in 1180. In religious respect, however, Sittensen formed part of the Roman Catholic Diocese of Verden until after 1566 when its incumbent bishops lost papal recognition, except of a last Catholic bishop from 1630 to 1631, respectively. In 1648 the Prince-Archbishopric was transformed into the Duchy of Bremen, which was first ruled in personal union by the Swedish and from 1715 on by the Hanoverian Crown. In 1823, the Duchy was abolished and its territory became part of the Stade Region.

Sittensen is also the seat of the Samtgemeinde ("collective municipality") Sittensen.
