= Tarmstedt (Samtgemeinde) =

Samtgemeinde in Lower Saxony

- Samtgemeinde
- Location of Tarmstedt within Rotenburg district
- Interactive map of Tarmstedt
- Location within Germany Location within Lower Saxony
- Country: Germany
- State: Lower Saxony
- District: Rotenburg
- Seat: Tarmstedt
- Subdivisions: 8 municipalities

Area
  - Total: 186.82 km^{2} (72.13 sq mi)

Population (2025-12-31)
  - Total: 10,951
  - Density: 58.618/km^{2} (151.82/sq mi)
- Time zone: UTC+01:00 (CET)
  - Summer (DST): UTC+02:00 (CEST)
- Website: www.tarmstedt.de

Tarmstedt is a Samtgemeinde ("collective municipality") in the district of Rotenburg, in Lower Saxony, Germany. Its seat is in the village Tarmstedt.

The Samtgemeinde Tarmstedt consists of the following municipalities:

1. Breddorf
2. Bülstedt
3. Hepstedt
4. Kirchtimke
5. Tarmstedt
6. Vorwerk
7. Westertimke
8. Wilstedt
