= Wieste =

River in Germany

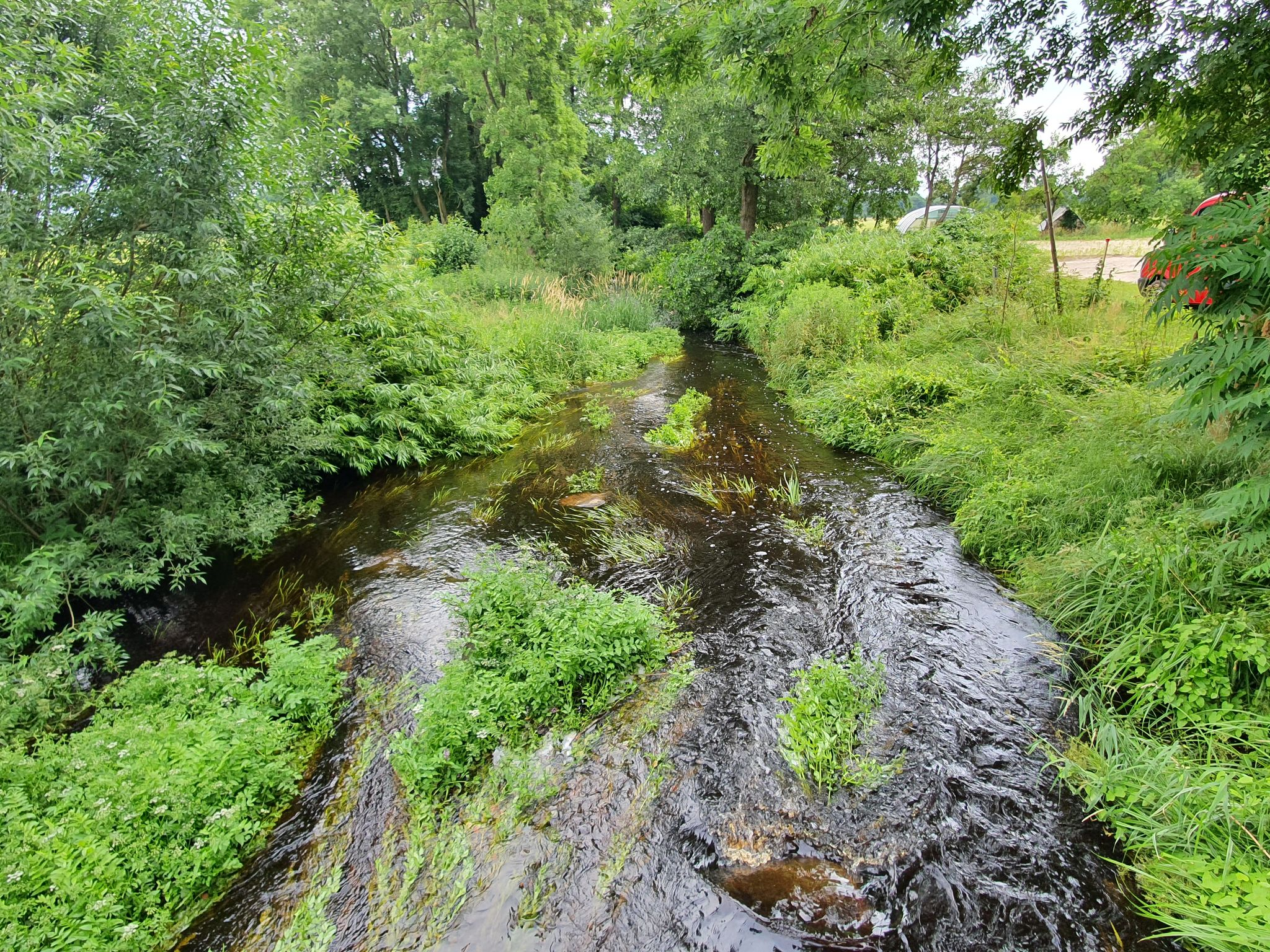

Location
- Country: Germany
- State: Lower Saxony

Physical characteristics
- Mouth
  - location: Wümme
  - coordinates: 53.1005°N 9.1478°E
- Length: 25.2 km (15.7 mi)

Basin features
- Progression: Wümme→ Lesum→ Weser→ North Sea

Wieste is a river of Lower Saxony, Germany. It flows into the Wümme near Ottersberg.

== See also ==
- List of rivers of Lower Saxony
