= Kalbe, Lower Saxony =

Kalbe
- Municipality
- Location of Kalbe within Rotenburg (Wümme) district
- Interactive map of Kalbe
- Location within Germany Location within Lower Saxony
- Coordinates: 53°17′38″N 09°33′07″E
- Country: Germany
- State: Lower Saxony
- District: Rotenburg (Wümme)
- Municipal assoc.: Sittensen

Government
  - Mayor: Bernd Petersen

Area
  - Total: 10.27 km^{2} (3.97 sq mi)
- Elevation: 41 m (135 ft)

Population (2025-12-31)
  - Total: 616
  - Density: 60.0/km^{2} (155/sq mi)
- Time zone: UTC+01:00 (CET)
  - Summer (DST): UTC+02:00 (CEST)
- Postal codes: 27419
- Dialling codes: 04282
- Vehicle registration: ROW
- Website: www.sittensen.de

Kalbe (German pronunciation: [ˈkalbə]) is a municipality in the district of Rotenburg, in Lower Saxony, in northern Germany.

== History ==
Kalbe belonged to the Prince-Archbishopric of Bremen, established in 1180. In 1648 the Prince-Archbishopric was transformed into the Duchy of Bremen, which was first ruled in personal union by the Swedish Crown - interrupted by a Danish occupation (1712–1715) - and from 1715 on by the Hanoverian Crown. In 1807 the ephemeral Kingdom of Westphalia annexed the Duchy, before France annexed it in 1810. In 1813 the Duchy was restored to the Electorate of Hanover, which - after its upgrade to the Kingdom of Hanover in 1814 - incorporated the Duchy in a real union and the Ducal territory, including Kalbe, became part of the new Stade Region, established in 1823.

During the final stages of World War II, on 25 March 1945, Kalbe was the site of a stopover during the German-organised march of Polish prisoners of war from the Oflag II-D camp to the Stalag X-B camp.
