= Stade Geest =

Coordinates: 53.3893°N 9.1483°E

The Stade Geest (German: Stader Geest; Northern Low Saxon: Stoder Geest) is a natural region of low, sandy heath (geest) in the North German Plain.

It includes a large part of the Elbe-Weser Triangle between the cities of Hamburg, Bremen and Cuxhaven and is bordered by the natural regions of the Elbe Marsch, Weser Marsch, Weser-Aller Plain and Lüneburg Heath. It is number D27 in the Federal Agency for Nature Conservation's list of natural regions of Germany.

The region known as the Stade Geest belongs administratively to the districts of Osterholz, Verden, Cuxhaven, Rotenburg (Wümme) and Stade, which used to be within the former province of Stade (Regierungsbezirk Stade). Small parts of the Geest also belong to the cities of Bremen and Bremerhaven

== Subdivisions ==
The Stade Geest is further subdivided into the morainic areas of young drift (Jungmoränen) left by the Vistula glaciation: the Wesermünde Geest and Zeven Geest, which are separated by the Hamme-Oste Depression, and the Achim-Verden Geest, that is separated from the other two by the Wümme Depression.
