= Kalbe (Meißner) =

Mountain in Germany

Coordinates: 51°13′N 9°52′E

Highest point
- Elevation: 719.5 m (2,361 ft)

Geography
- Location: Hesse, Germany

Kalbe (German pronunciation: [ˈkalbə]) is a mountain of Hesse, Germany.
