= Sittensen (Samtgemeinde) =

- Samtgemeinde
- Location of Sittensen within Rotenburg district
- Interactive map of Sittensen
- Location within Germany Location within Lower Saxony
- Country: Germany
- State: Lower Saxony
- District: Rotenburg
- Seat: Sittensen
- Subdivisions: 9 municipalities

Area
  - Total: 139.04 km^{2} (53.68 sq mi)

Population (2025-12-31)
  - Total: 11,937
  - Density: 85.853/km^{2} (222.36/sq mi)
- Time zone: UTC+01:00 (CET)
  - Summer (DST): UTC+02:00 (CEST)
- Website: sittensen.de

Sittensen is a Samtgemeinde ("collective municipality") in the district of Rotenburg, in Lower Saxony, Germany. Its seat is in the village Sittensen.

== Municipalities ==
The Samtgemeinde Sittensen consists of the following municipalities:

1. Groß Meckelsen
2. Hamersen
3. Kalbe
4. Klein Meckelsen
5. Lengenbostel
6. Sittensen
7. Tiste
8. Vierden
9. Wohnste
