= Geestequelle =

- Samtgemeinde
- Location of Geestequelle within Rotenburg district
- Interactive map of Geestequelle
- Location within Germany Location within Lower Saxony
- Country: Germany
- State: Lower Saxony
- District: Rotenburg
- Seat: Oerel
- Subdivisions: 5 municipalities

Area
  - Total: 140.87 km^{2} (54.39 sq mi)

Population (2025-12-31)
  - Total: 6,484
  - Density: 46.03/km^{2} (119.2/sq mi)
- Time zone: UTC+01:00 (CET)
  - Summer (DST): UTC+02:00 (CEST)
- Website: www.geestequelle.de

Geestequelle is a Samtgemeinde ("collective municipality") in the district of Rotenburg, in Lower Saxony, Germany. It is situated west of Bremervörde, and approx. 50 km northeast of Bremen. It is named after the source (German: Quelle) of the small river Geeste. Its seat is in Oerel.

The Samtgemeinde Geestequelle consists of the municipalities of Alfstedt, Basdahl, Ebersdorf, Hipstedt, and Oerel.
