= Heidfeld (nature reserve) =

Coordinates: 52°21′34″N 7°15′0″E

- IUCN category IV (habitat/species management area)
- Interactive map of Heidfeld
- Location: Hopsten, Steinfurt, North Rhine-Westphalia, Germany
- Nearest city: Rheine
- Area: 192.12 ha (474.7 acres)
- Established: 1988
- Governing body: North Rhine-Westphalia State Agency for Nature, Environment and Consumer Protection

Heidfeld is a Naturschutzgebiet (nature reserve) in Lower Saxony in the area of Engden in the Schüttorf Samtgemeinde in the County of Bentheim and the municipality of Emsbüren in Landkreis Emsland.

The nature reserve is designated NSG WE 241 and has an area of 200 hectares. 164 of its hectares are located in Bentheim while 36 hectares lie within Emslands. The Ahlder flows through the north-eastern area of the reserve. Currently, the forest is mostly mixed pine interspersed with oak and beech trees.

The nature reserve is between Schüttorf und Emsbüren and to the west of A 31. It is located in a protected forest area, that is also home to an environmentally friendly forestry industry. Since 1998, 36.8 hectares of the forest areas are designated as protected. In a part of the protected area some of its trees are taken for commercial use.

The area has been under protected as a nature reserve since 12 December 2003. It was placed under the appropriate conversation authority in Landkreis Emsland.
