= Darnsee =

Lake in Bramsche, Lower Saxony, Germany

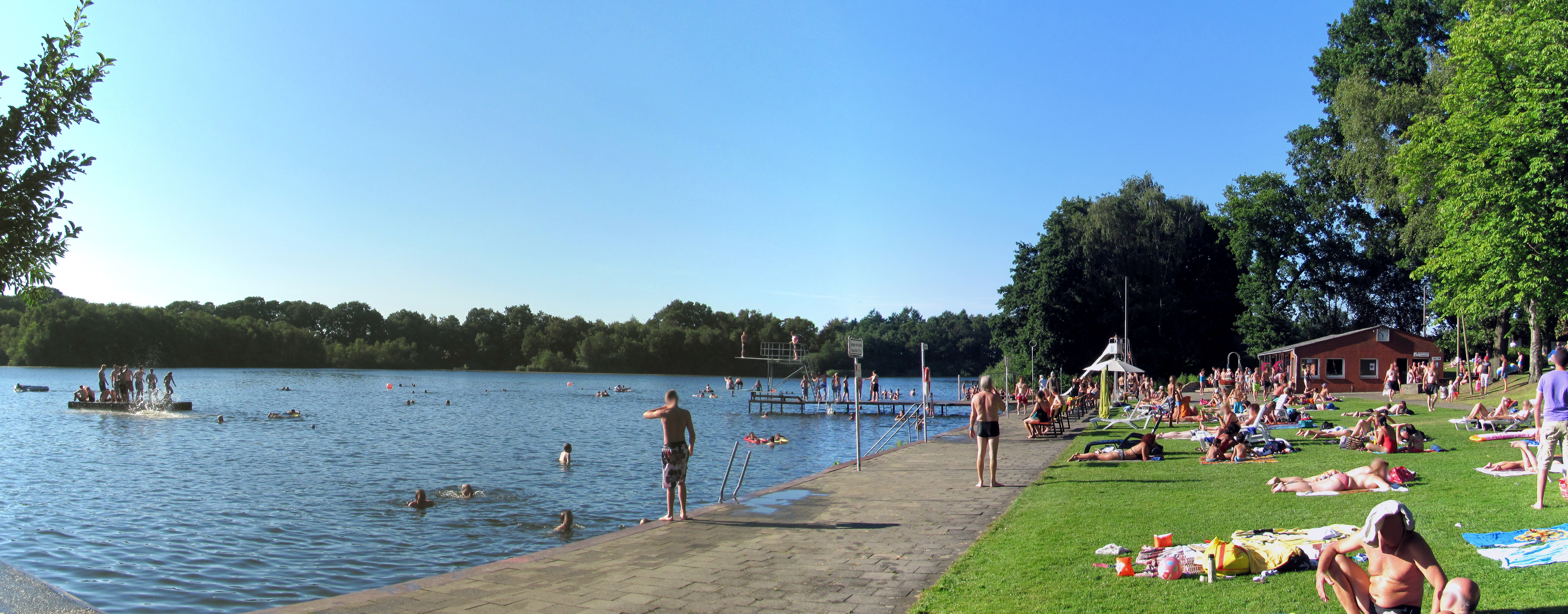

- Location within Lower Saxony
- Location: Bramsche, Lower Saxony, Germany
- Coordinates: 52°25′17″N 7°59′59″E
- Basin countries: Germany
- Max. depth: 8 m (26 ft)

Darnsee is a 8-metre (26 ft) deep lake in Bramsche, Lower Saxony, Germany.
