= Fintau =

River in Germany

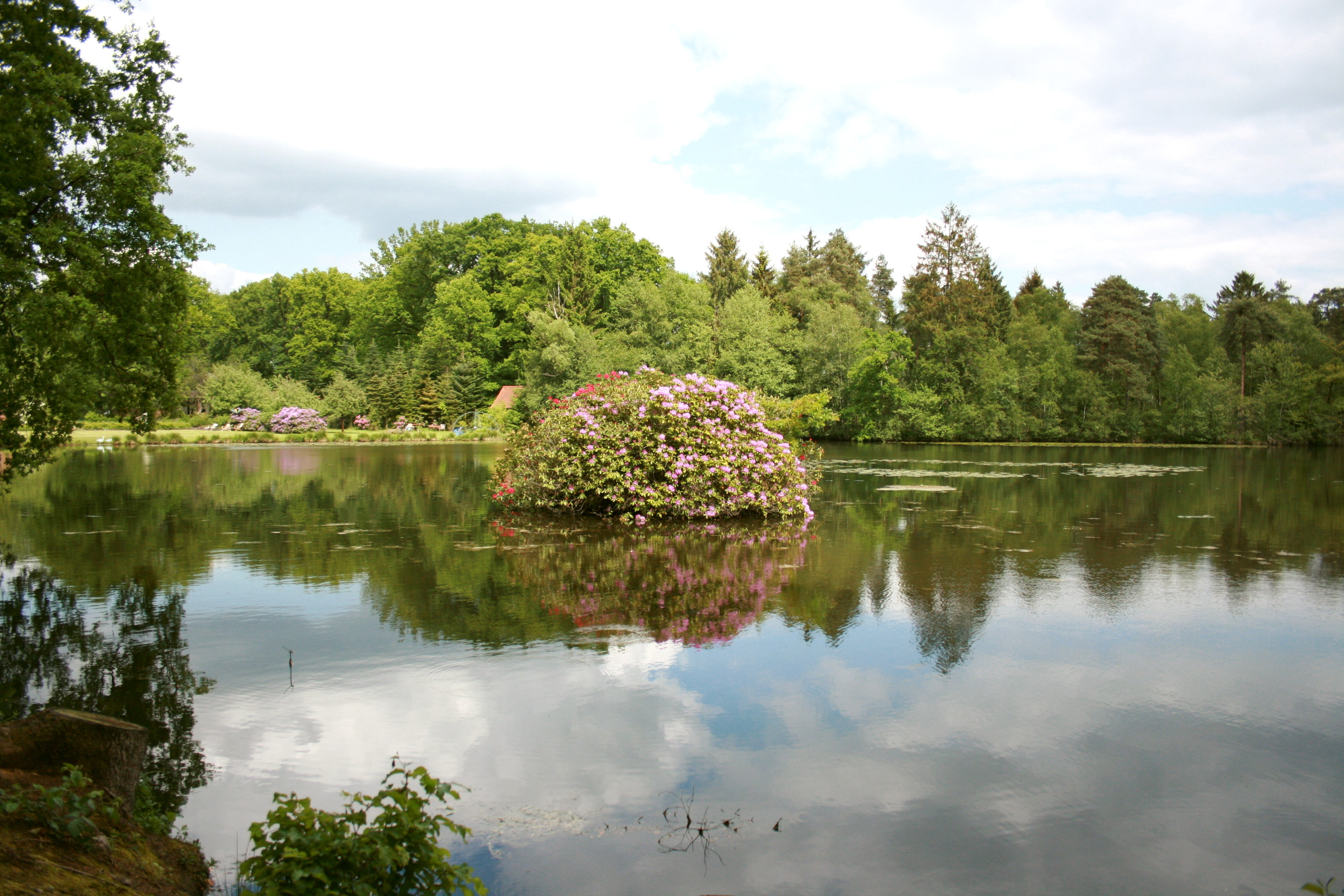

Location
- Country: Germany
- State: Lower Saxony

Physical characteristics
- Mouth
  - location: Wümme
  - coordinates: 53.2026°N 9.5468°E
- Length: 21.1 km (13.1 mi)

Basin features
- Progression: Wümme→ Lesum→ Weser→ North Sea

Fintau (German pronunciation: [ˈfɪntaʊ]) is a river of Lower Saxony, Germany. It flows into the Wümme in Lauenbrück.

== See also ==
- List of rivers of Lower Saxony
