= Kleiner Bullensee =

Lake in Lower Saxony, Germany

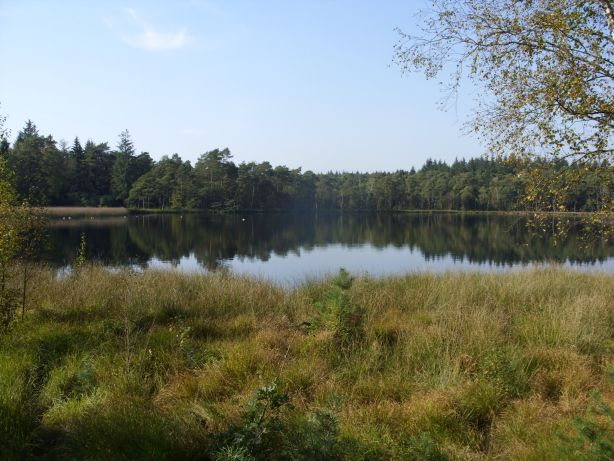
- Kleiner Bullensee (2011)

- Location within Lower Saxony
- Location: Rotenburg (Wümme), Lower Saxony
- Coordinates: 53.062882°N 9.409575°E
- Basin countries: Germany
- Max. length: 0.25 km (0.16 mi)
- Max. width: 0.15 km (0.093 mi)

Kleiner Bullensee is a lake in Rotenburg (Wümme), Lower Saxony, Germany. It lies within the Großes und Weißes Moor Naturschutzgebiet (nature reserve). A nearby lake is called Großer Bullensee.
