= Ahausen =

Village in Germany

- Municipality
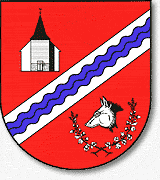
- Coat of arms

- Location of Ahausen within Rotenburg (Wümme) district
- Interactive map of Ahausen
- Location within Germany Location within Lower Saxony
- Coordinates: 53°03′51″N 9°18′53″E
- Country: Germany
- State: Lower Saxony
- District: Rotenburg (Wümme)
- Municipal assoc.: Sottrum
- Subdivisions: 2

Government
  - Mayor: Bernhard Hasselhoff

Area
  - Total: 34.41 km^{2} (13.29 sq mi)
- Elevation: 25 m (82 ft)

Population (2025-12-31)
  - Total: 1,882
  - Density: 54.69/km^{2} (141.7/sq mi)
- Time zone: UTC+01:00 (CET)
  - Summer (DST): UTC+02:00 (CEST)
- Postal codes: 27367
- Dialling codes: 04269
- Vehicle registration: ROW
- Website: www.sottrum.de

Ahausen is a village in the district of Rotenburg, in Lower Saxony, Germany. Ahausen is administratively part of the collective community of Sottrum.

== History ==
The first record of the village was in 1226 as "Ouhusen". Then Ahausen belonged to the Prince-Bishopric of Verden, established in 1180. The town was destroyed in the Thirty Years War (1618–1648) by the forces of Count Tilly. In 1648 the Prince-Bishopric was transformed into the Principality of Verden, which was first ruled in personal union by the Swedish Crown — interrupted by a Danish occupation (1712–1715) — and from 1715 on by the Hanoverian Crown. The Kingdom of Hanover incorporated the Principality in a real union and the Princely territory, including Ahausen, became part of the new Stade Region, established in 1823.

== Geography ==
Ahausen is located 8 km (5 miles) southwest of Rotenburg, 35 km (22 miles) east of Bremen and 70 km (44 miles) southwest of Hamburg. The Wümme river flows from east to west about 2 km north of the center of Ahausen.

== Coat of arms ==
The Coat of Arms symbolizes the local church, the Wümme river and other local streams, and the nearby nature preserve known as "Wolf's Ground" (Wolfsgrund).

== Intersections ==
Ahausen is 2 km north of Federal Highway 215 and about 10 km from Autobahns 1 and 27.

== Attractions ==
The Evangelical Lutheran church is the village's landmark. The church was rebuilt in 1637 and again in 1848.

The Ahauser mill with its 9-acre (36,000 m^{2}) mill pond is a popular tourist attraction.

The area around Ahausen is heavily forested, and the many trails throughout are ideal for hiking. There are also large areas of nature preserve consisting of moorland/heath. Wolfsgrund is a well known preserve to the south.
