= Bothel (Samtgemeinde) =

Samtgemeinde in Lower Saxony

- Samtgemeinde

- Location of Bothel within Rotenburg district
- Interactive map of Bothel
- Location within Germany Location within Lower Saxony
- Country: Germany
- State: Lower Saxony
- District: Rotenburg
- Founded: 1971
- Seat: Bothel
- Subdivisions: 6 municipalities

Area
  - Total: 148.94 km^{2} (57.51 sq mi)

Population (2025-12-31)
  - Total: 8,334
  - Density: 55.96/km^{2} (144.9/sq mi)
- Time zone: UTC+01:00 (CET)
  - Summer (DST): UTC+02:00 (CEST)
- Website: www.bothel.de

Bothel is a Samtgemeinde ("collective municipality") in the district of Rotenburg, in Lower Saxony, Germany, established in 1971. Its seat is in the village Bothel.

The Samtgemeinde Bothel consists of the following municipalities:

1. Bothel
2. Brockel
3. Hemsbünde
4. Hemslingen
5. Kirchwalsede
6. Westerwalsede

== Public health ==
Since an epimediological study finding a disproportionate increase in cases of leukemia and lymphoma in men in Bothel was published in 2014, there has been strong opposition to fracking in natural gas production within the Bothel Samtgemeinderat.
