= Bothel, Lower Saxony =

Bothel
- Municipality
- Location of Bothel within Rotenburg district
- Interactive map of Bothel
- Location within Germany Location within Lower Saxony
- Coordinates: 53°4′N 9°30′E
- Country: Germany
- State: Lower Saxony
- District: Rotenburg

Government
  - Mayor: Erika Schmidt (SPD)

Area
  - Total: 16.71 km^{2} (6.45 sq mi)
- Elevation: 30 m (98 ft)

Population (2025-12-31)
  - Total: 2,390
  - Density: 143/km^{2} (370/sq mi)
- Time zone: UTC+01:00 (CET)
  - Summer (DST): UTC+02:00 (CEST)
- Postal codes: 27386
- Dialling codes: 04266
- Vehicle registration: ROW
- Website: bothel.de

Bothel (German pronunciation: [ˈboːtl̩]) is a municipality in the district of Rotenburg, Germany in the Stade Geest region of central Lower Saxony. It has 2,500 inhabitants. Bothel was founded by workers of the nearby Trochel Forest. The name developed from Borstel which is Old Saxon and means "little woods".

Bothel belonged to the Prince-Bishopric of Verden, established in 1180. In 1648 the Prince-Bishopric was transformed into the Principality of Verden, which was first ruled in personal union by the Swedish Crown – interrupted by a Danish occupation (1712–1715) – and from 1715 on by the Hanoverian Crown. In 1807 the ephemeric Kingdom of Westphalia annexed the Principality, before France annexed it in 1810. In 1813 the Principality was restored to the Electorate of Hanover, which – after its upgrade to the Kingdom of Hanover in 1814 – incorporated the Principality in a real union and the Princely territory, including Bothel, became part of the new Stade Region, established in 1823.

Today the community has an old town part with typical Low Saxon farm houses and a modern center with town hall, schools and shopping facilities. So Bothel is important for the surrounding villages.

Bothel is also the seat of the Samtgemeinde ("collective municipality") Bothel.
