= Rotenburg (district) =

District in Lower Saxony, Germany

Coordinates: 53°15′N 9°20′E

- District
- Flag Coat of arms
- Country: Germany
- State: Lower Saxony
- Capital: Rotenburg

Government
  - District admin.: Marco Prietz (CDU)

Area
  - Total: 2,070 km^{2} (800 sq mi)

Population (31 December 2022)
  - Total: 167,604
  - Density: 81/km^{2} (210/sq mi)
- Time zone: UTC+01:00 (CET)
  - Summer (DST): UTC+02:00 (CEST)
- Vehicle registration: ROW, BRV
- Website: www.lk-row.de

Rotenburg is a district (Landkreis) in Lower Saxony, Germany. It is landlocked by (from the north and clockwise) the districts of Stade, Harburg, Heidekreis, Verden, Osterholz and Cuxhaven.

== History ==
In medieval times the region was part of the bishoprics of Bremen and Verden. After the Protestant Reformation the bishoprics became secular principalities, colloquially called Bremen-Verden, and finally parts of the Kingdom of Hanover.

The present district was established in 1977 by merging the former districts of Rotenburg and Bremervörde.

== Geography ==
The Wümme River runs through the district from east to west. The marshy area to both sides of the river is called the Wümmeniederung (Wümme Depression).

== Coat of arms ==
The coat of arms displays:

- a lion carrying a cross; the lion was the heraldic animal of Hanover, the cross is symbolising the Prince-Bishopric of Verden
- two criss-crossed keys from the arms of the Prince-Archbishopric of Bremen

== Towns and municipalities ==
Clickable map of towns and municipalities in the district

Towns	Samtgemeinden
1. Bremervörde; 2. Rotenburg; 3. Visselhövede; Free municipalities: 1. Gnarrenburg; 2. Scheeßel	1. Bothel; 1. Bothel^{1}; 2. Brockel; 3. Hemsbünde; 4. Hemslingen; 5. Kirchwalsede; 6. Westerwalsede; 2. Fintel; 1. Fintel; 2. Helvesiek; 3. Lauenbrück^{1}; 4. Stemmen; 5. Vahlde; 3. Geestequelle; 1. Alfstedt; 2. Basdahl; 3. Ebersdorf; 4. Hipstedt; 5. Oerel^{1}	4. Selsingen; 1. Anderlingen; 2. Deinstedt; 3. Farven; 4. Ostereistedt; 5. Rhade; 6. Sandbostel; 7. Seedorf; 8. Selsingen^{1}; 5. Sittensen; 1. Groß Meckelsen; 2. Hamersen; 3. Kalbe; 4. Klein Meckelsen; 5. Lengenbostel; 6. Sittensen^{1}; 7. Tiste; 8. Vierden; 9. Wohnste	6. Sottrum; 1. Ahausen; 2. Bötersen; 3. Hassendorf; 4. Hellwege; 5. Horstedt; 6. Reeßum; 7. Sottrum^{1}; 7. Tarmstedt; 1. Breddorf; 2. Bülstedt; 3. Hepstedt; 4. Kirchtimke; 5. Tarmstedt^{1}; 6. Vorwerk; 7. Westertimke; 8. Wilstedt; 8. Zeven; 1. Elsdorf; 2. Gyhum; 3. Heeslingen; 4. Zeven^{1, 2}
	^{1}seat of the Samtgemeinde; ^{2}town
