= Aue (Elbe) =

River in Germany

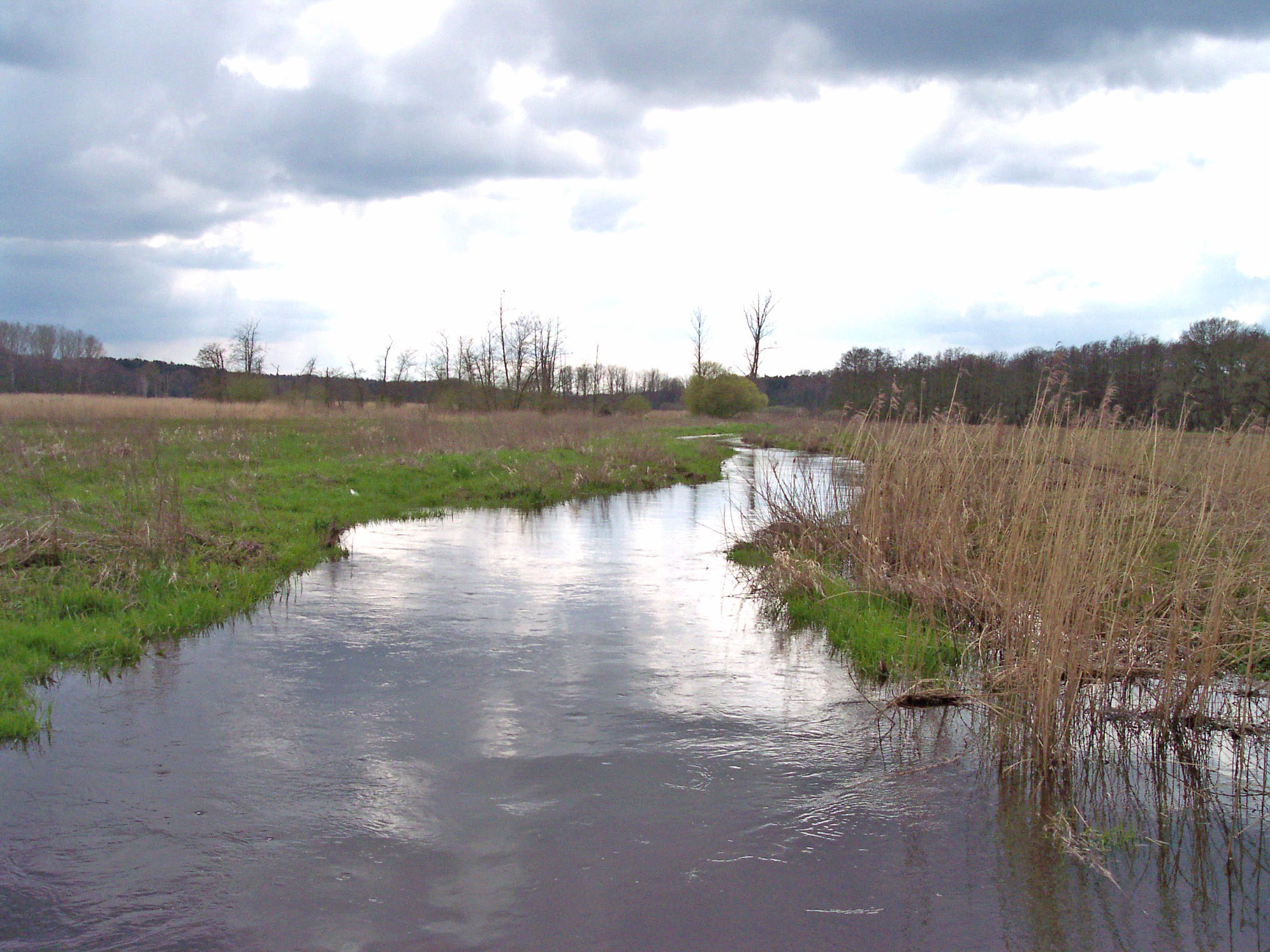
- The Aue between Bliedersdorf and Horneburg in spring 2006

- Location of mouth

Location
- Location: Lower Saxony, Germany
- Reference no.: DE: 596

Physical characteristics
- Source
  - location: near Ahlerstedt
  - coordinates: 53°24′41.75″N 9°29′12.25″E
  - elevation: 43 m above sea level (NN)
- Mouth
  - location: In Horneburg at its confluence with the Landwettern to form the Lühe
  - coordinates: 53°30′43.5″N 9°35′27.25″E
  - elevation: 2 m above sea level (NN)
- Length: 31.5 km (19.6 mi)

Basin features
- Progression: Lühe → Elbe → North Sea
- River system: Elbe
- Landmarks: Villages: Ahlerstedt, Bargstedt, Harsefeld, Bliedersdorf, Horneburg
- Tributaries
  - left: Tiefenbach
  - right: Brakengraben, Steinbeck, Landwettern, Rellerbach

The Aue (German pronunciation: [ˈaʊə]) is a river in northern Germany in the district of Stade in Lower Saxony. It has a length of about 30 km (19 mi).

== Course ==
The Aue rises in the vicinity of Klethen near Ahlerstedt and flows through the towns and villages of:

- Ahrensmoor-West,
- Ahrenswohlde,
- Bokel,
- Klethen,
- Oersdorf,
- Kakerbeck,
- Bargstedt/Klein Hollenbeck,
- Harsefeld,
- Issendorf and
- Bliedersdorf

to Horneburg, where it changes its name and from there on flows as the Lühe for a further 12.7 km (7.9 mi) to the River Elbe.

== Flood ==
In August 2002 a flood, caused by a long period of heavy rain in the catchment area of the river, broke through the dykes at Horneburg and caused considerable damage there. Horneburg responded to the threat of further flooding by building a stronger quay wall within the village and renovating the dykes.

== Gallery ==
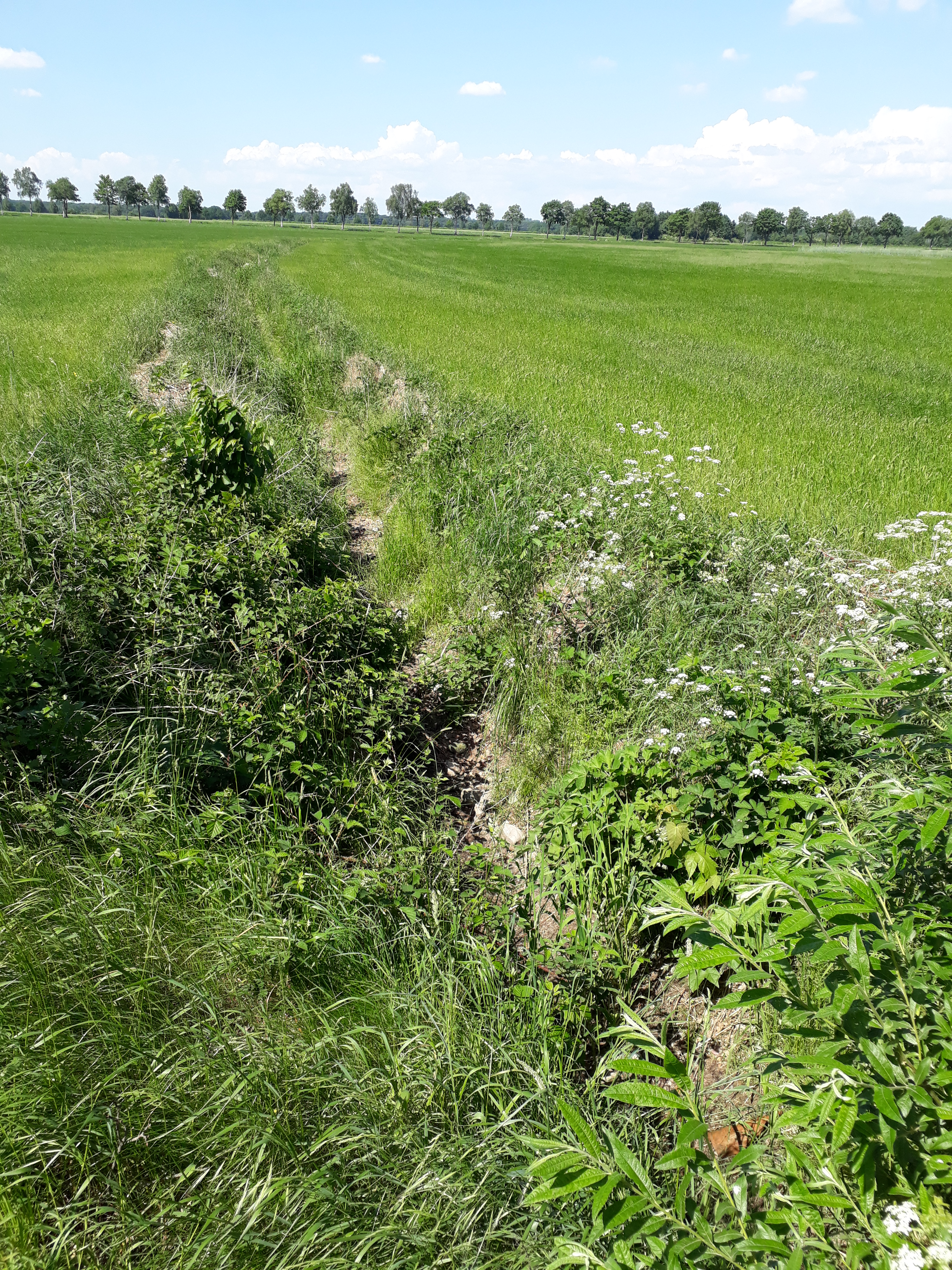
The Aue in Ahrensmoor

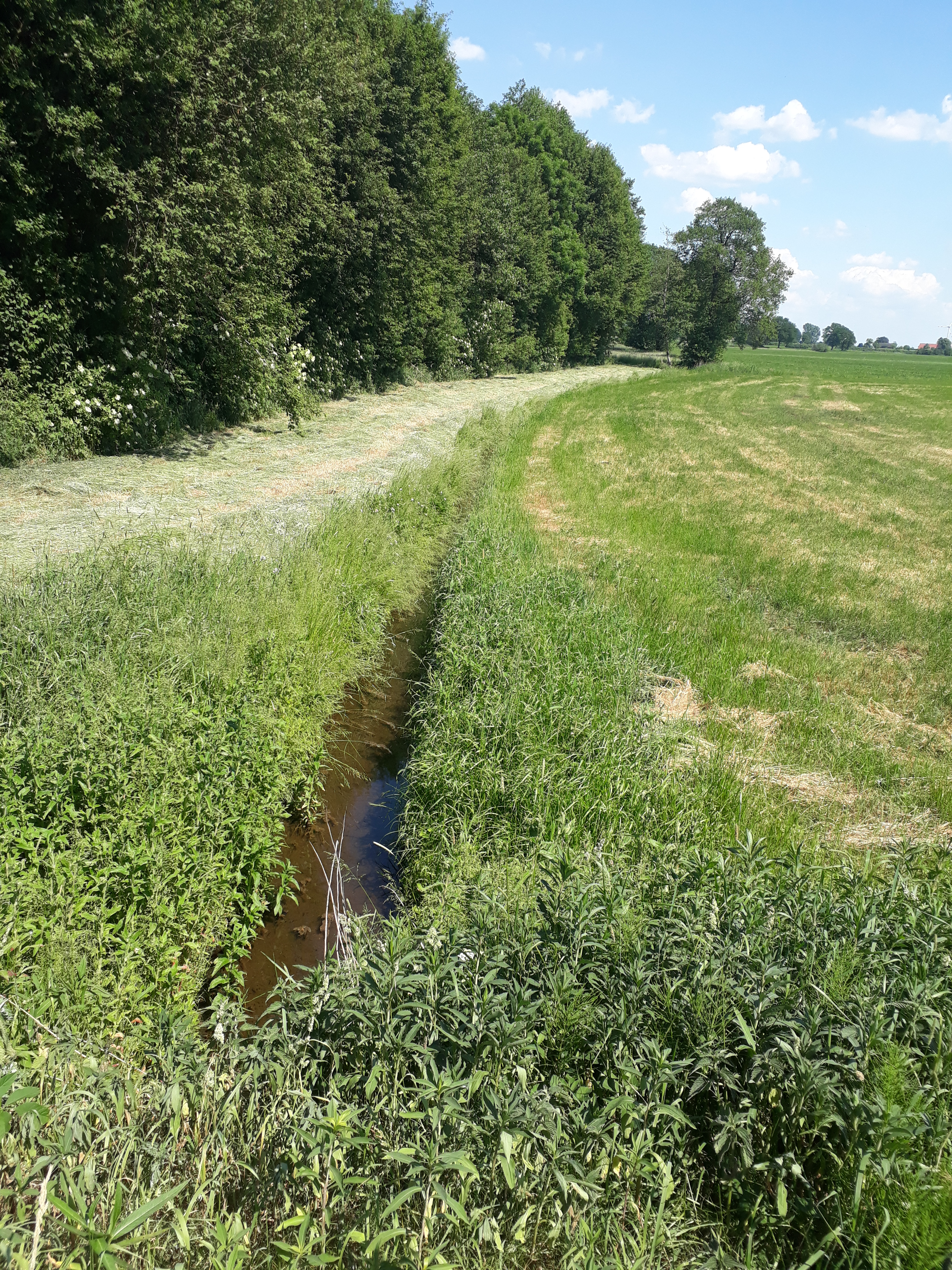
The Aue near Ahrenswohlde

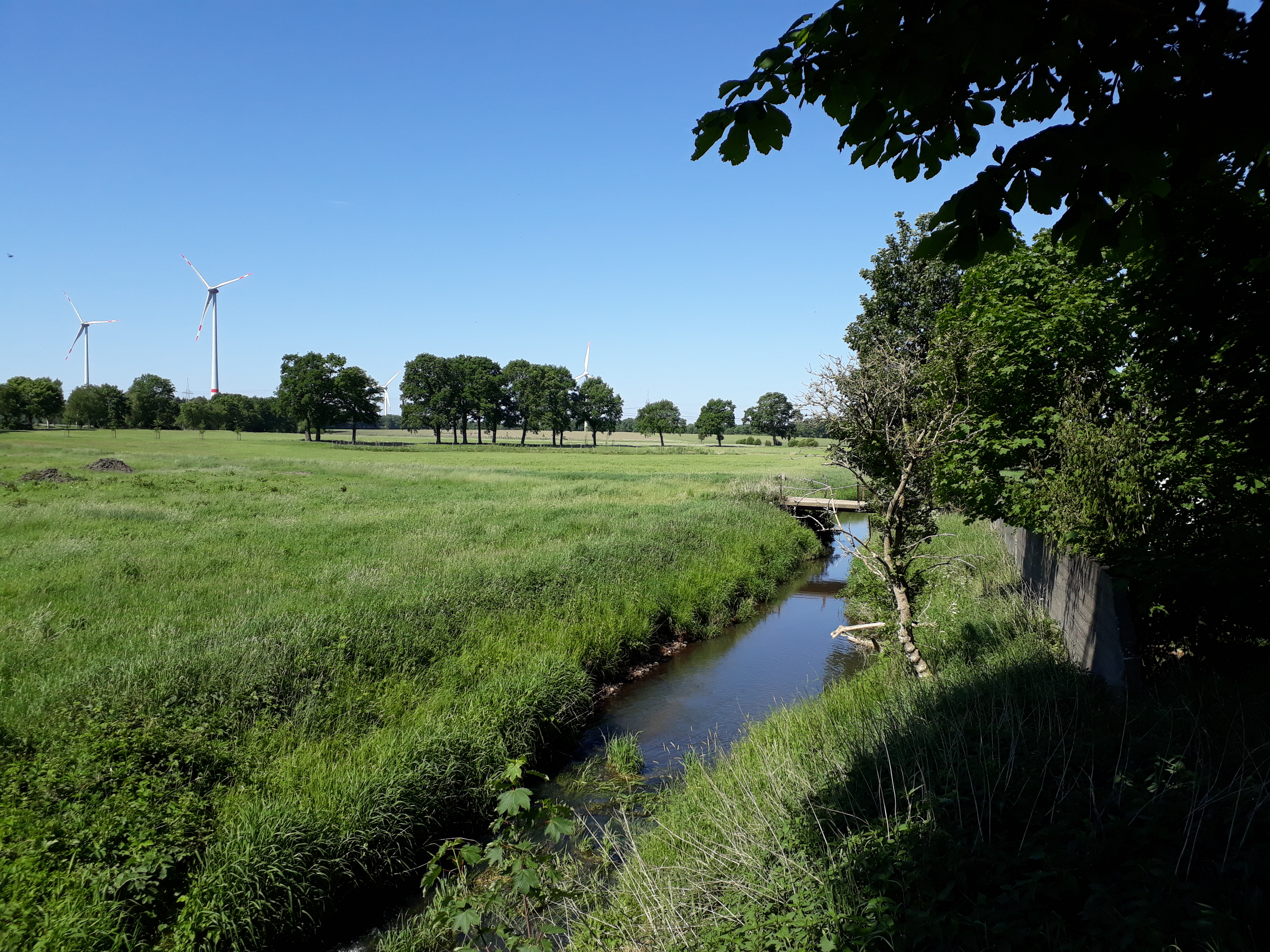
The Aue in Oersdorf

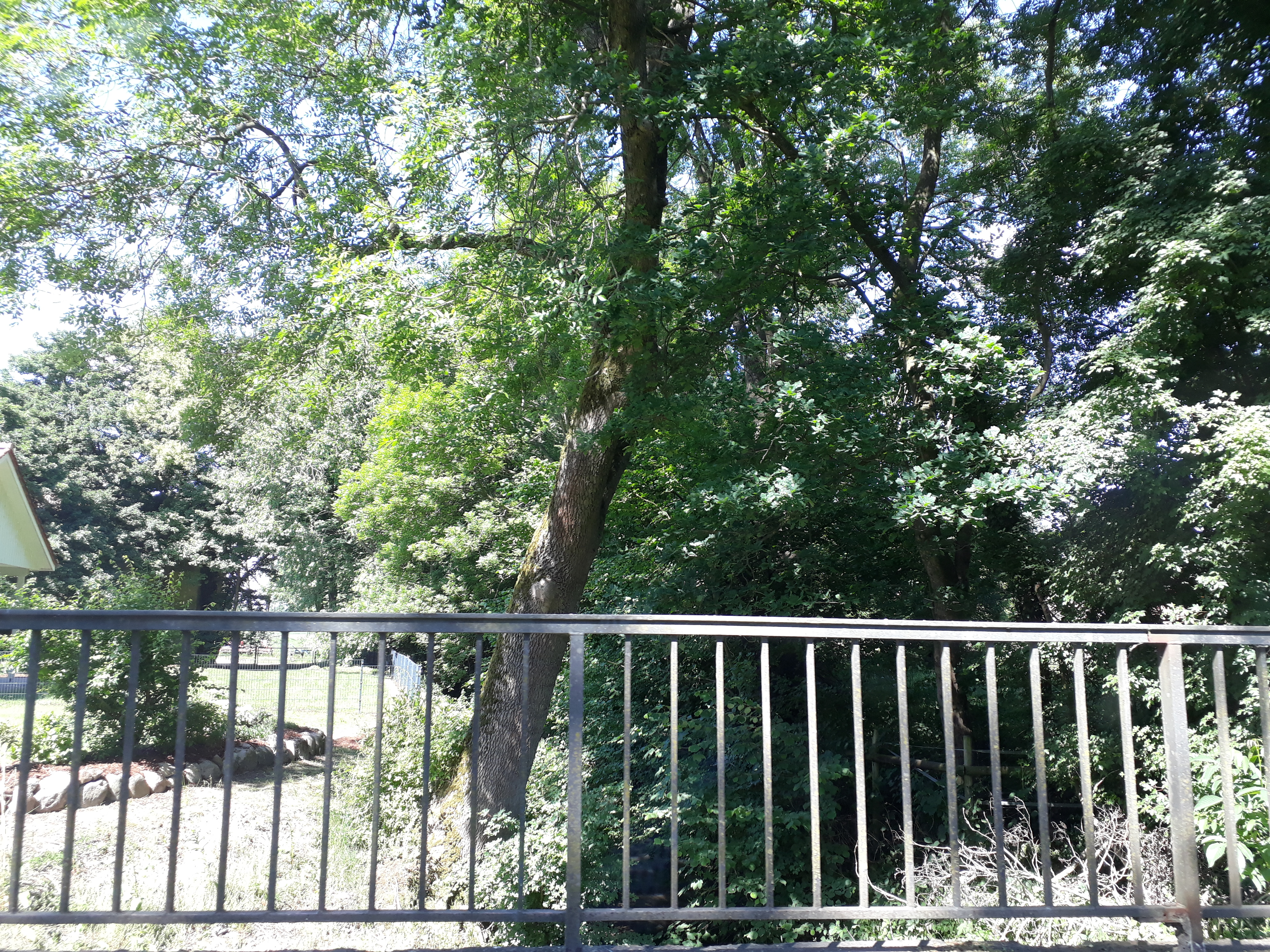
The Aue in Klethen

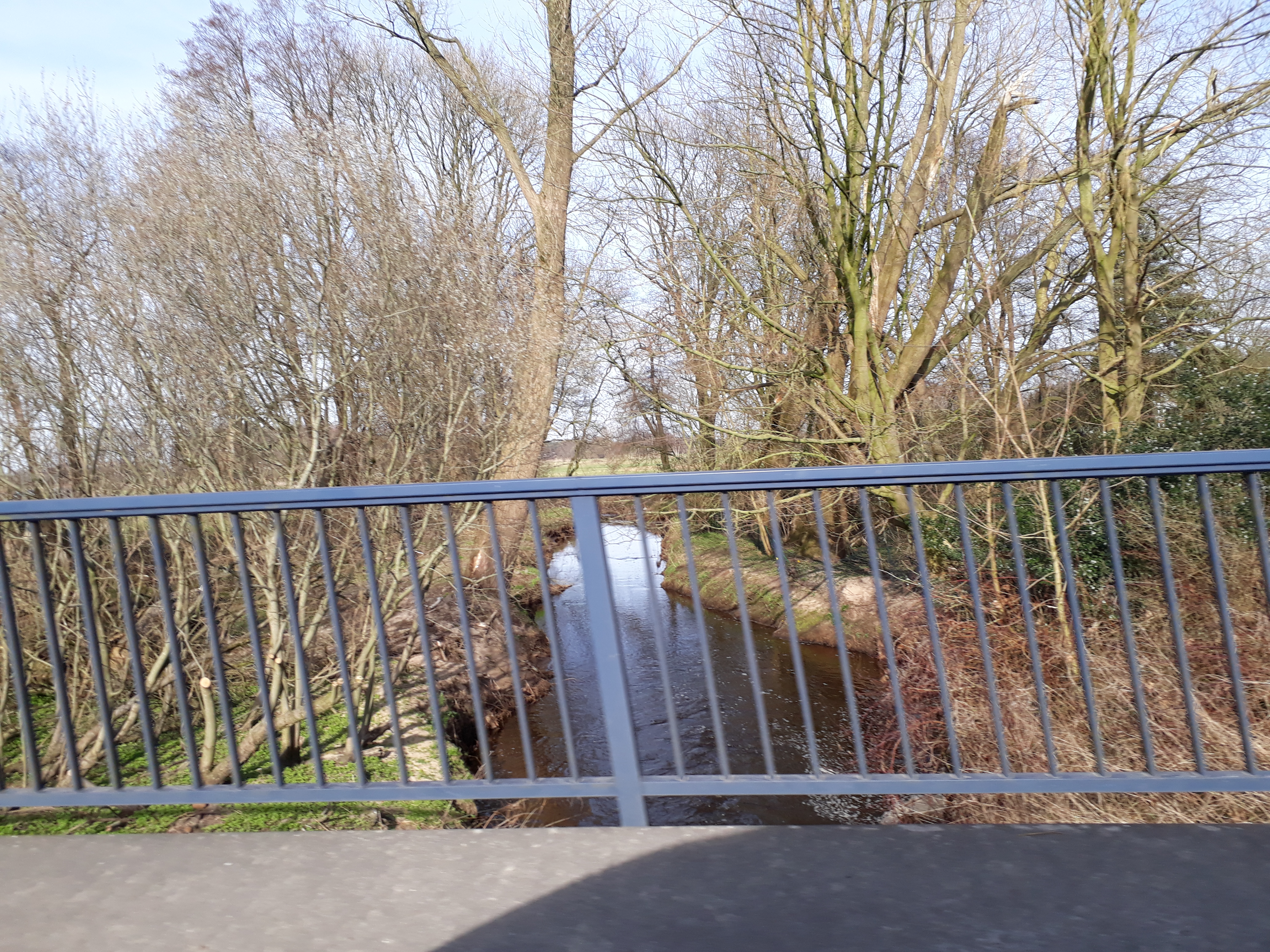
The Aue in Kakerbeck

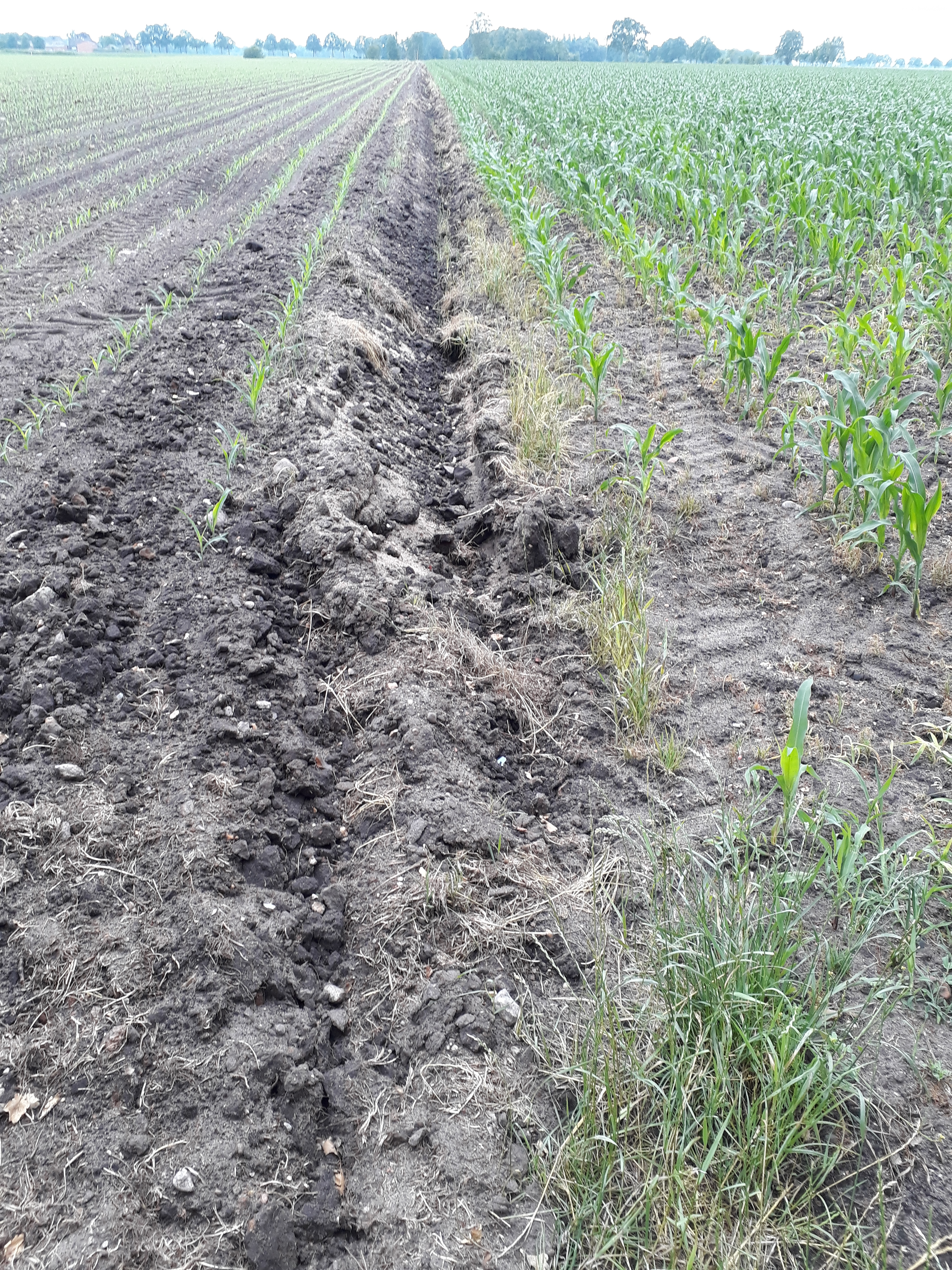
Source of the Aue near Ahrensmoor-Nord

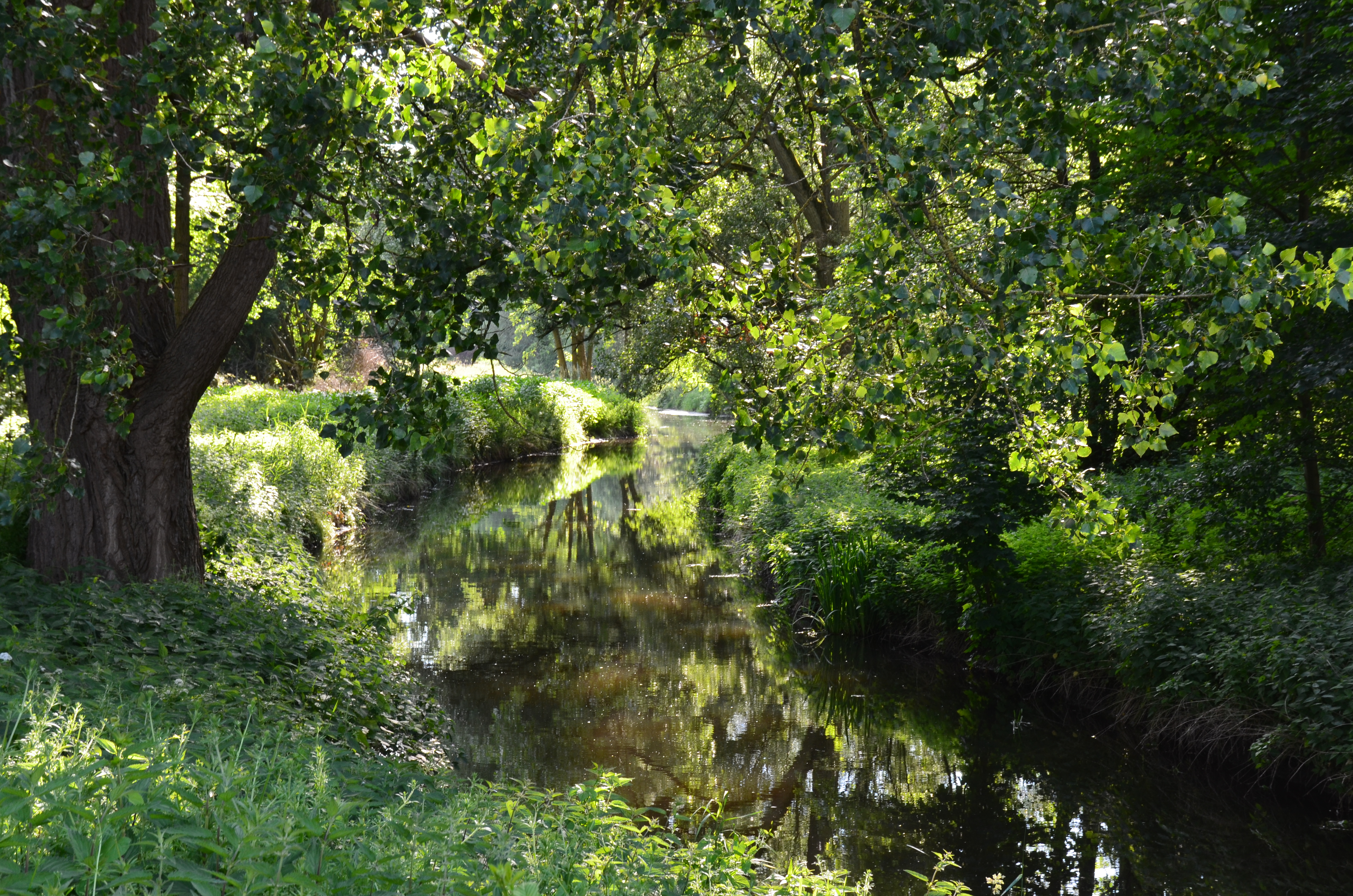
The Aue near Harsefeld (June 2017)

== See also ==
- List of rivers of Lower Saxony
