= Bliedersdorf =

Bliedersdorf Bliedersdorf (German) Bliersdörp (Low Saxon)
- Municipality
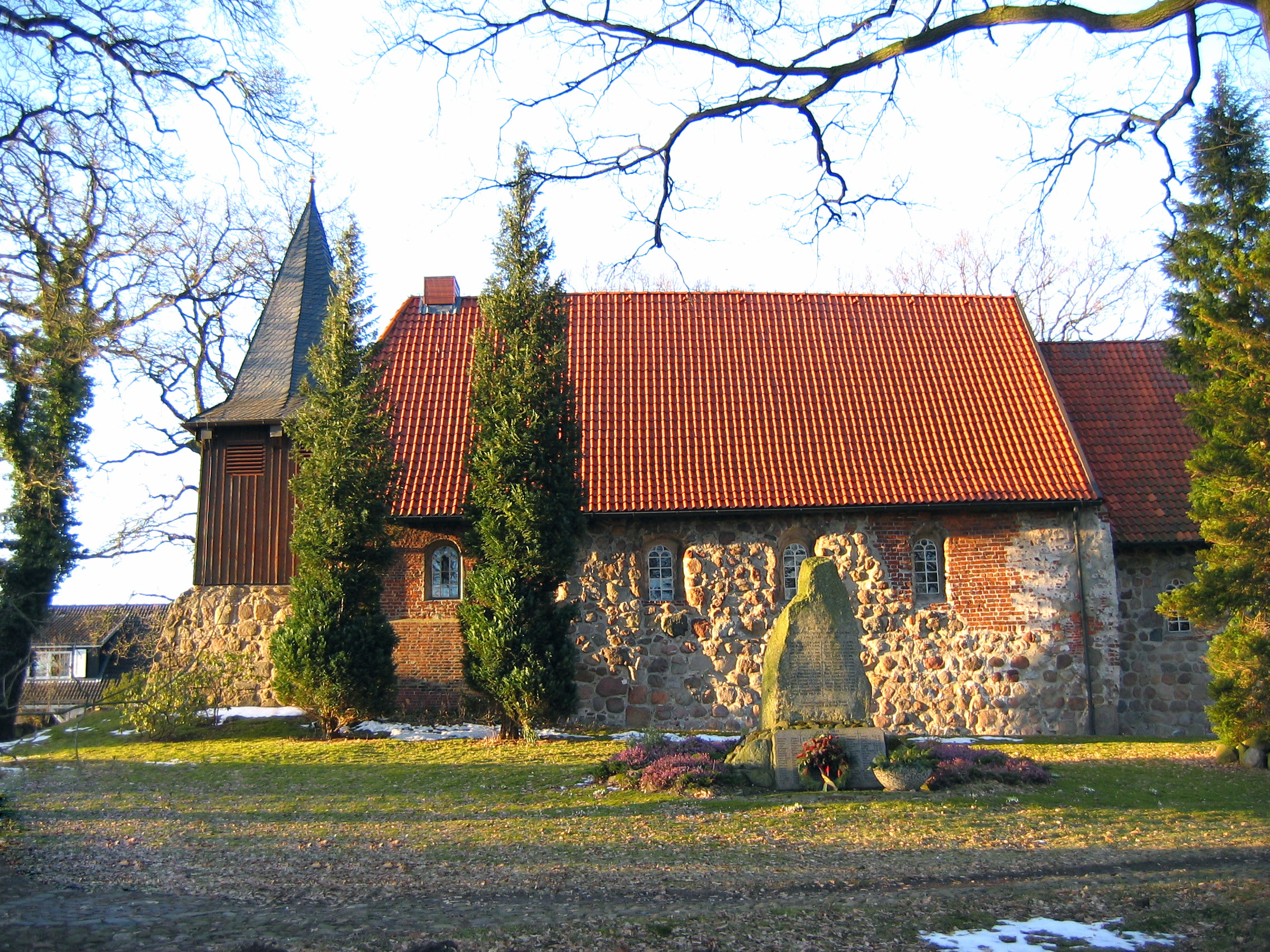
- St. Catherine's Church

- Coat of arms

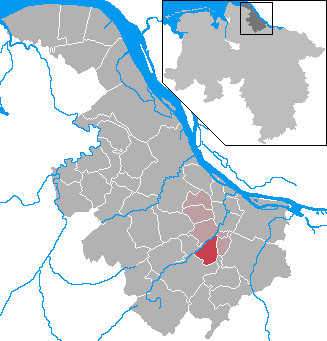
- Location of Bliedersdorf within Stade district
- Interactive map of Bliedersdorf
- Location within Germany Location within Lower Saxony
- Coordinates: 53°28′58″N 9°34′16″E
- Country: Germany
- State: Lower Saxony
- District: Stade
- Municipal assoc.: Horneburg
- Subdivisions: 3 villages

Government
  - Mayor: Tobias Terne (CDU)

Area
  - Total: 12.41 km^{2} (4.79 sq mi)
- Elevation: 23 m (75 ft)

Population (2025-12-31)
  - Total: 1,881
  - Density: 151.6/km^{2} (392.6/sq mi)
- Time zone: UTC+01:00 (CET)
  - Summer (DST): UTC+02:00 (CEST)
- Postal codes: 21640
- Dialling codes: 04163
- Vehicle registration: STD
- Website: www.horneburg.de

Bliedersdorf (German pronunciation: [ˈbliːdɐsˌdɔʁf]; in Low Saxon: Bliersdörp) is a municipality in the district of Stade, Lower Saxony, Germany. It is east of Nottensdorf, southwest of Horneburg, and northwest of the simple dolmen megaliths of Grundoldendorf.

Like the rest of Stade, it is part of the Elbe-Weser Triangle.

== Early years ==
The Archbishopric of Bremen, formed in 1180, included what would become known as Bliedersdorf. The local church, St. Catherine's, was built from fieldstones and completed in 1240; it was named for Catherine of Alexandria.

In the mid-16th century, the inhabitants adopted Lutheranism, in recognition of the principle of Cuius regio, eius religio formalized by the Peace of Augsburg. During the Leaguist occupation under Tilly (1628–1630), they were targets of the Counter-Reformation.

In 1648 the Prince-Archbishopric was transformed into the Duchy of Bremen, which was first ruled in personal union by the Swedish and from 1715 on by the Hanoverian Crown. In 1807 the Kingdom of Westphalia annexed the duchy, before France annexed it in 1810. In 1813 the duchy was restored to the Electorate of Hanover, which – after its upgrade to the Kingdom of Hanover in 1814 – incorporated the Duchy in a real union and the ducal territory, including Bliedersdorf, became part of the Stade Region, established in 1823.

== Modern history ==
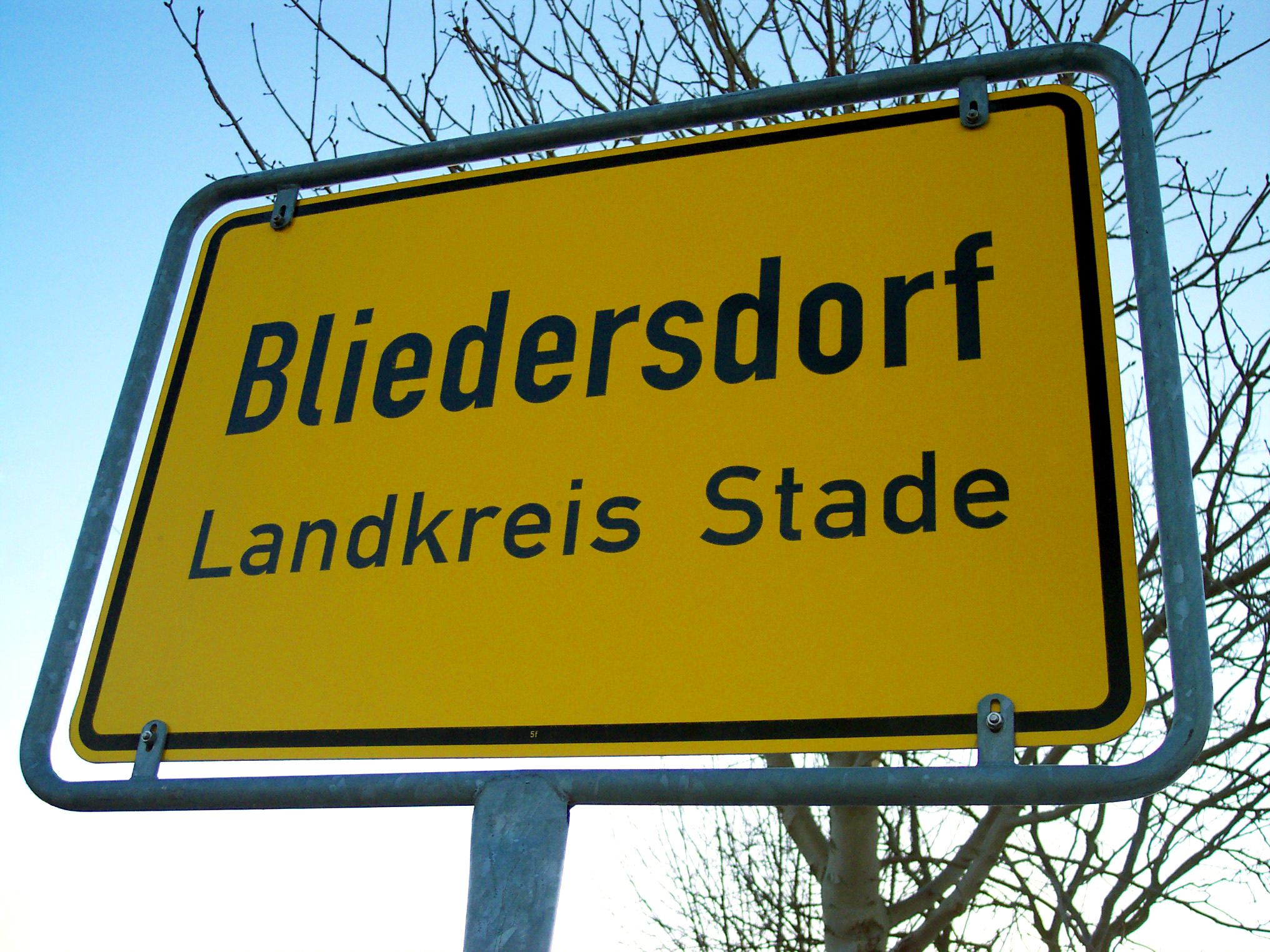

In 1866, Bliedersdorf, like the rest of the Stade Region, became part of the Kingdom of Prussia, which was then followed by the establishment of the Free State of Prussia (1918–1946/47) and then Lower Saxony.

Modern Bliedersdorf is part of the Horneburg Samtgemeinde ("municipal association"), which also includes Horneburg itself, Agathenburg, Dollern, and Nottensdorf.

Bliedersdorf consists of three villages: Bliedersdorf itself, Postmoor and Rutenbeck.
