= Party of Reason =

Libertarian political party in Germany

Party of Reason Partei der Vernunft
- Leader: Friedrich Dominicus
- General Secretary: Dirk Hesse
- Deputy leaders: Enrico Pietzsch, Charles Krüger
- Executive director: Maria Zanke
- Treasurer: Alexander Malchow
- Additional executive committee members: Georg Semmler, Stefanie Kaiser, Lilia Kalaschnikova
- Founded: 30 May 2009
- Headquarters: Markgrafenstr. 15; 76646 Bruchsal; Germany
- Membership (2011): > 1,000
- Ideology: Austro-libertarianism; Euroscepticism; Right-libertarianism
- International affiliation: International Alliance of Libertarian Parties,
- Colors: Yellow Black; Blue (formerly)
- Slogan: "Wir lieben Freiheit." (We love liberty.)
- Bundestag: 0 / 709
- Regional Parliaments: 0 / 1,855
- European Parliament: 0 / 96

Website
- www.parteidervernunft.de

The Party of Reason (German: Partei der Vernunft, PdV) is a libertarian political party in Germany founded in May 2009 by Oliver Janich.

The party's policies are based on the Austrian School of economics. It campaigns for libertarian positions, including a minimal state and free markets. It supports various positions such as not believing in anthropogenic global warming.

In September 2013, the PDV, together with libertarian parties from Spain (Party of Individual Freedom), France (Liberal Democratic Party) and the Netherlands (Libertarian Party) signed the Utrecht Declaration and Covenant of European Classical Liberal and Libertarian Parties, establishing the European Party for Individual Liberty (EPIL).

== Elections ==
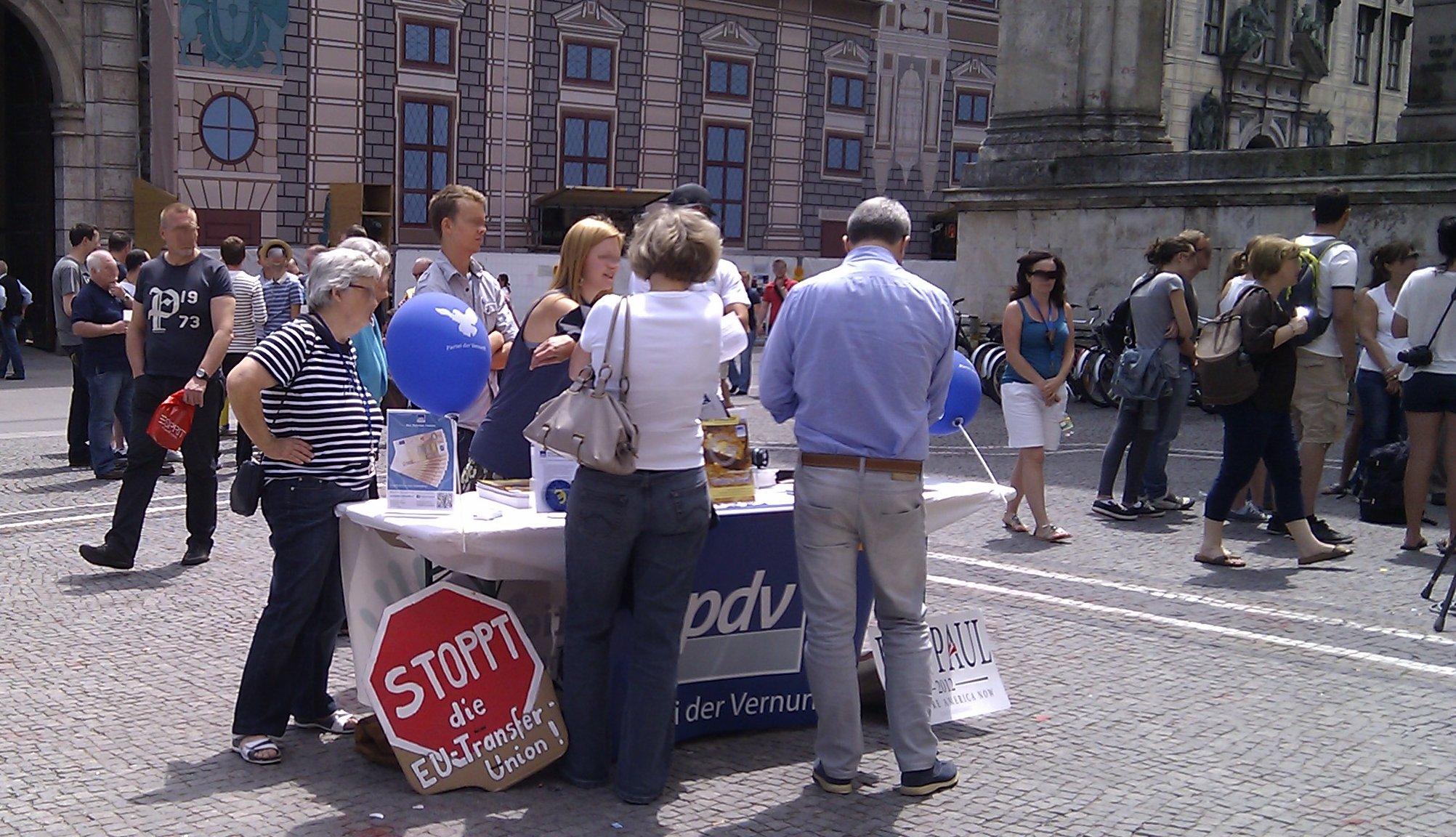
Party of Reason information booth about the European Stability Mechanism (ESM), Munich, June 2012

In 2011, the PDV participated in the local elections in Lower Saxony, winning one seat in the Flecken Harsefeld municipal council, two seats in the Samtgemeinde Harsefeld municipal council, and a further seat in the Bremervörde municipal council.

Harald Ebert, member of the City council of Erding, and former member of the Free Democratic Party (FDP), joined the PDV in 2012.

The party's first participation in German state elections was in the 2012 North Rhine-Westphalia state election on 13 May 2012, but it did not secure any seats in the Landtag.

The PDV participated 2013 federal election on 22 September 2013, attaining ballot access in four states (Baden-Württemberg, Bavaria, North Rhine-Westphalia and Rhineland-Palatinate), and winning almost 25,000 second votes (0.1%). The party also fielded a number of direct candidates.

== Election results ==
=== European Parliament ===
Election	List leader	Votes	%	Seats	+/–	EP Group
2024	Dirk Hesse	29,508	0.07 (#30)	0 / 96	New	–
