= Oliver Janich =

German journalist and author (born 1969)

Personal details
- Born: Oliver Markus Raoul Janich; 3 January 1969 (age 57) Munich, Germany
- Party: Party of Reason (2009–2013)
- Profession: Journalist; Author
- Website: Personal website (in German)

Oliver Markus Raoul Janich (born 3 January 1969) is a German far-right conspiracy theorist, former journalist, author and banned YouTuber. He is the founder and former president of the libertarian minor party, Partei der Vernunft (Party of Reason). In 2022, he was sentenced to a prison term in Germany.

== Investigations and conspiracy theories ==
Janich worked as an editor for the German magazine Focus Money where he was effectively let go in 2010 for advertising his own political party, the Party of Reason, in the magazine.

=== Investigations against Janich for alleged stock market manipulation ===
Together with two friends from the time he studied economics, Janich was part of a network of stock traders and stock market journalists ("Bosler-Clique") who systemically raised the share prices of rather unknown listed companies, whose shares had previously been bought by people in their network, by promoting the purchase of the companies shares. In September 2010, the Public Prosecutor's Office of Munich ordered a search of the offices and apartments of approximately 30 suspects including Janich. The ringleaders of the conspiracy, of whom Janich was not one according to findings from the trial, were convicted in 2012. Several stock market journalists had reduced their sentences by admitting their crimes and only received suspended sentences at most.

He currently resides in the Philippines. In August 2022, he was arrested by the Philippine authorities at a resort in Romblon.

=== Conspiracy theories ===
As a financial journalist, Janich represented conspiracy theories about 9/11 in several of his articles and these theories are present in his books as well. Furthermore, he spread conspiracy theories about alleged election fraud during the 2018 Bavarian state election without providing any evidence.

Janich published a YouTube video against the appointment of Sinan Selen as Vice President of the Federal Office for the Protection of the Constitution, claiming that Selen had gotten the job "at the request of the Turkish government". According to German magazine Spiegel Online, his YouTube videos contain "partly racist statements and employ anti-Semitic conspiracy theories".

Janich is considered a disseminator of the QAnon conspiracy theories.

== Party of Reason ==
Janich founded the Party of Reason after the proposal to found a party, which he made in a Focus Money column, received positive feedback from his readers.

On 17 April 2013, Janich resigned as chairman of the party.

== Political views ==
Janich supported the Alternative for Germany (AfD) ahead of the 2017 German federal election. In 2018 he compared a documentary of the children's TV-channel KiKa with the propaganda of Joseph Goebbels. Also in 2018, Janich distributed a video that allegedly showed journalists staging images of refugees in a maritime emergency. Journalist Jacques Pezet later exposed the video as fake. After the 2018 Bavarian state election, the German television channel Bayerische Rundfunk reported on its website that Janich was distributing videos that were alleging fraud during the election without providing any proof whatsoever.

In June 2020, the German TV-program Frontal, showed in a feature on conspiracy theorists, how Janich was talking about tribunals for politicians and journalists, saying that "Many of the people in power today actually belong hanged".

== Works ==
- Money-Management. Rationalität und Anwendung des Fixed-fractional-Ansatzes. TM-Börsenverlag, Rosenheim 1996, ISBN 3-930851-10-5
- Das Kapitalismus-Komplott. Die geheimen Zirkel der Macht und ihre Methoden. FinanzBuch-Verlag, München 2010, ISBN 978-3-89879-577-7
- Die Vereinigten Staaten von Europa. Geheimdokumente enthüllen: Die dunklen Pläne der Elite. FinanzBuch-Verlag, München 2013, ISBN 978-3-89879-820-4
