= Jost Fitschen =

German botanist

Jost Fitschen (1 January 1869, in Brest (Lower Saxony) – 26 January 1947, in Hamburg-Altona) was a German botanist known for his work in the field of dendrology.

Beginning in 1889, he worked as a schoolteacher in the town of Geversdorf, afterwards teaching classes in Magdeburg (1894–1901), where he worked closely with Otto Schmeil. With Schmeil, he was co-author of the popular "Flora von Deutschland", a book on German flora that was published over many editions (98th edition issued in 2023). From 1901 to 1930, he taught classes in Altona, where for a period of time he also served as an academic rector. In his later years, he suffered from a nervous disorder that placed severe limitations on his activities.

== Publications ==
- Flora von Deutschland : ein Hilfsbuch zum Bestimmen der zwischen den deutschen Meeren und den Alpen wildwachsenden und angebauten Pflanzen (with Otto Schmeil) Leipzig : Quelle & Meyer, edition 30, 1922 – Flora of Germany: An auxiliary book to determine wild and frequently cultivated plants in Germany.
- Handbuch der Nadelholzkunde: Systematik, Beschreibung, Verwendung u. Kultur d. Ginkgoaceen, Freiland-Koniferen u. Gnetaceen. Für Gärtner, Forstbeamte u. Botaniker. Mit Beitr. v. H. Klebahn u.a. Mit 204 Textabb (with Ludwig Beissner) 1930 – Handbook of softwoods : systematics, descriptions, usage in cultivation of Ginkgoaceae, free-range conifers and Gnetaceae. For gardeners, forestry officials and botanists. with contributions by Heinrich Klebahn, inter alia with 204 text abbreviations.
- Gehölzflora ein Buch zum Bestimmen der in Deutschland und den angrenzenden Ländern wildwachsenden und angepflanzten Bäume und Sträucher. 3., erw. Aufl 1935 – Woody plants; a book for the determination of wild and cultivated trees and shrubs in Germany and neighboring countries.
