= Neukloster station =

Railway station in Buxtehude, Germany

Neukloster
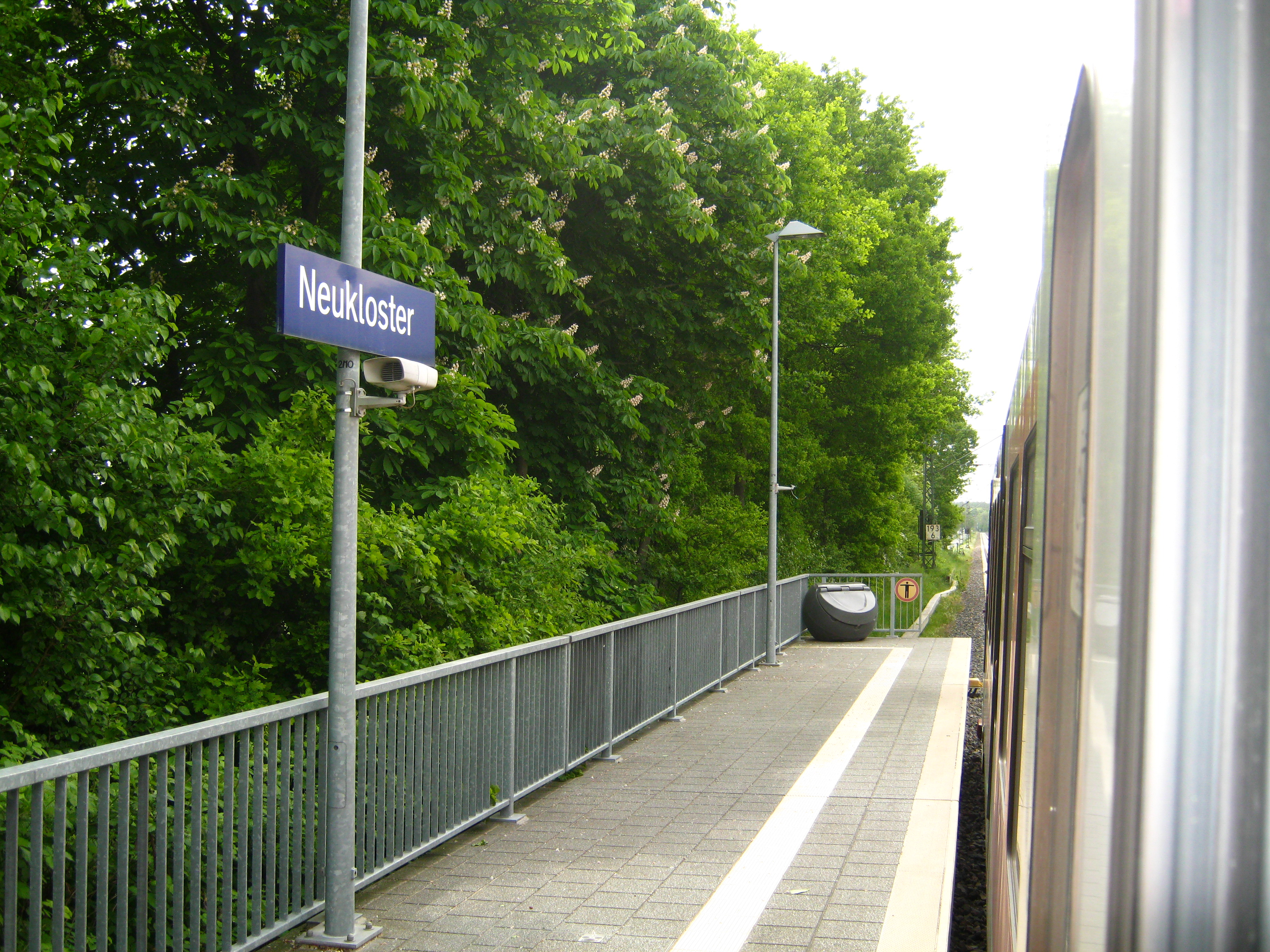

General information
- Location: Jorker Straße 10; 21614 Neukloster; Germany
- Coordinates: 53°28′53″N 9°38′22″E
- Line: Hamburg S-Bahn

Construction
- Structure type: At grade
- Parking: Park and ride
- Accessible: yes

Other information
- Station code: ds100: DB station code: 4411; Type: Category: 6
- Fare zone: HVV: D/709

History
- Opened: 1 April 1881; 145 years ago
- Electrified: 29 September 1968; 57 years ago

Services
Preceding station	Hamburg S-Bahn	Following station
Horneburg towards Stade	S5	Buxtehude towards Elbgaustraße
Location
- Location within Lower Saxony Location within Germany Location within Europe

Neukloster (German: Bahnhof or Haltestelle Neukloster) is a rapid transit train station, located in Neukloster, a village now part of the town Buxtehude, Lower Saxony. The trains of the Hamburg S-Bahn serve the station with the line S5 from Elbgaustraße station via central station to Stade.

== See also ==
- List of Hamburg S-Bahn stations
