= Dollern station =

Railway station in Dollern, Germany

Dollern
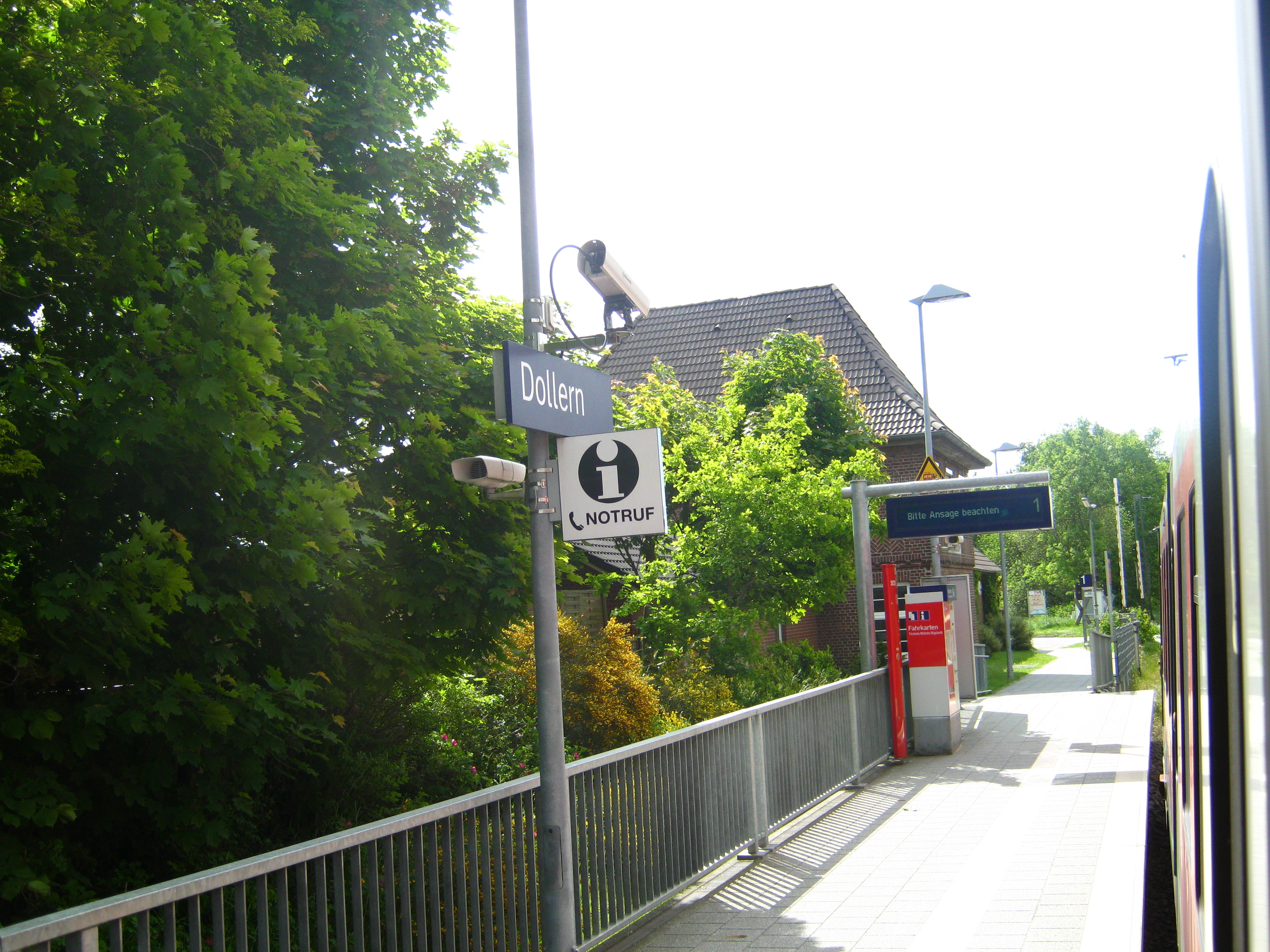
- Dollern Station in 2013

General information
- Location: Am Bahnhof 1; 21739 Dollern, Germany
- Coordinates: 53°32′45″N 9°33′27″E
- Lines: Hamburg S-Bahn

Construction
- Structure type: At grade
- Parking: Park and ride
- Accessible: yes

Other information
- Station code: ds100: DB station code: 1255; Type: Category: 6
- Fare zone: HVV: D/729

History
- Opened: 1 April 1881; 145 years ago
- Electrified: 29 September 1968; 57 years ago

Services
Preceding station	Hamburg S-Bahn	Following station
Agathenburg towards Stade	S5	Horneburg towards Elbgaustraße
Location
- Location within Lower Saxony Location within Germany Location within Europe

Dollern (German: Bahnhof or Haltestelle Dollern) is a rapid transit railway station, located in the village Dollern, Lower Saxony. The trains of the Hamburg S-Bahn serve the station on the line S5 from Elbgaustraße station via central station to Stade.
