= Bargstedt =

Bargstedt is the name of the following places in Germany:

- Bargstedt, Lower Saxony
- Bargstedt, Schleswig-Holstein
