= Agathenburg station =

Railway station in Agathenburg, Germany

Agathenburg
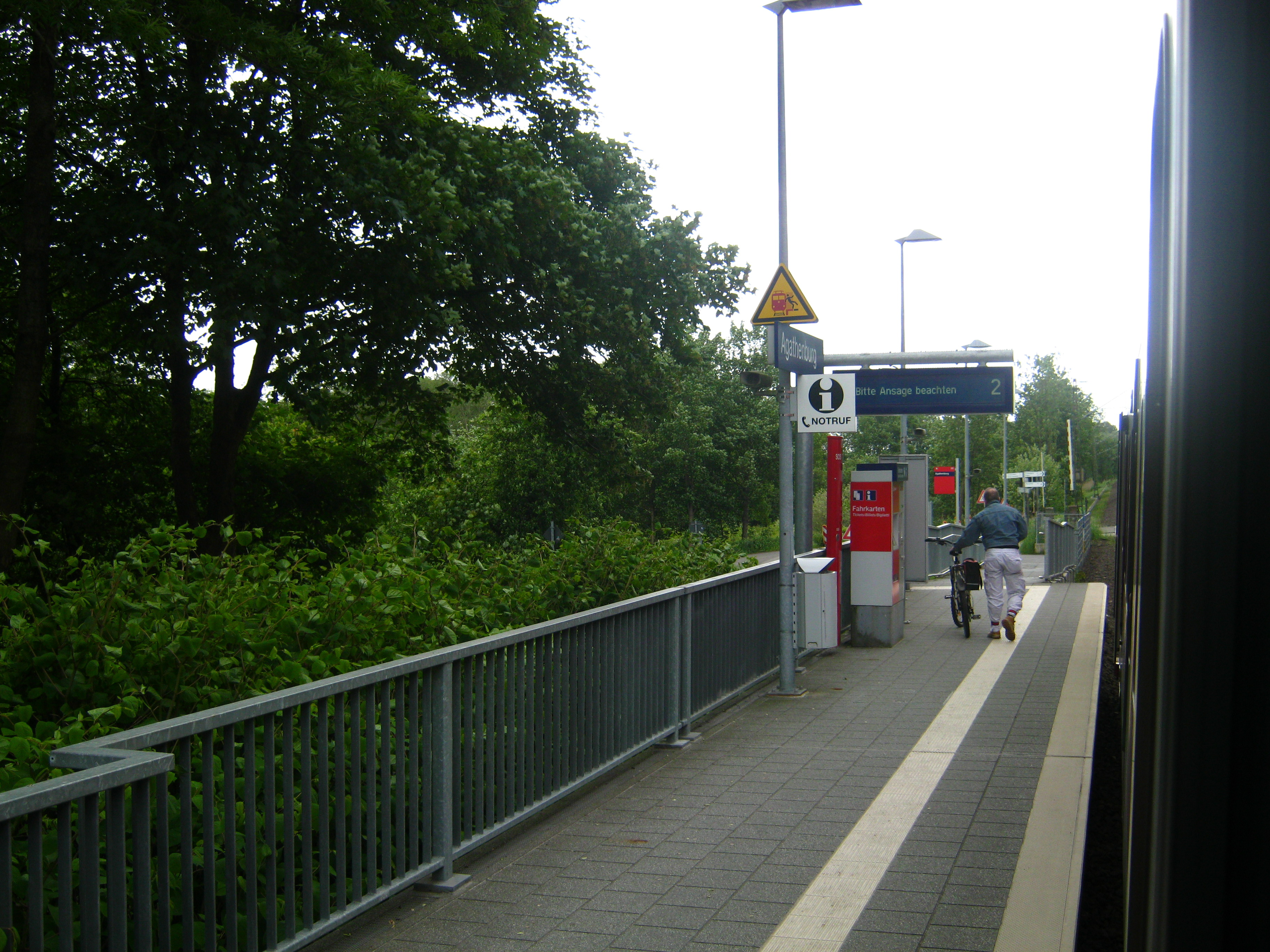
- The platform of Agathenburg station from an arriving train in 2013

General information
- Location: Bahnhofstr. 7; 21684 Agathenburg, Germany
- Coordinates: 53°33′48″N 9°31′56″E
- Lines: Hamburg S-Bahn

Construction
- Structure type: At grade
- Parking: Park and ride
- Accessible: yes

Other information
- Station code: ds100: DB station code: 0020; Type: Category: 6
- Fare zone: HVV: D and E/729 and 809

History
- Opened: 1 April 1881; 145 years ago
- Electrified: 29 September 1968; 57 years ago

Services
Preceding station	Hamburg S-Bahn	Following station
Stade Terminus	S5	Dollern towards Elbgaustraße
Location
- Location within Lower Saxony Location within Germany Location within Europe

Agathenburg (German: Bahnhof or Haltestelle Agathenburg) is a rapid transit railway station, located in the Agathenburg village, Lower Saxony.

The station is located on the edge of the village, accessed via Bahnhofstraße. The station car park is on the far side of the railway line, accessed via a level crossing on Wiesenweg.

The trains of the Hamburg S-Bahn serve the station with the line S5 from Elbgaustraße station via central station to Stade.

== See also ==
- List of Hamburg S-Bahn stations
