= Horneburg station =

Railway station in Horneburg, Germany

Horneburg
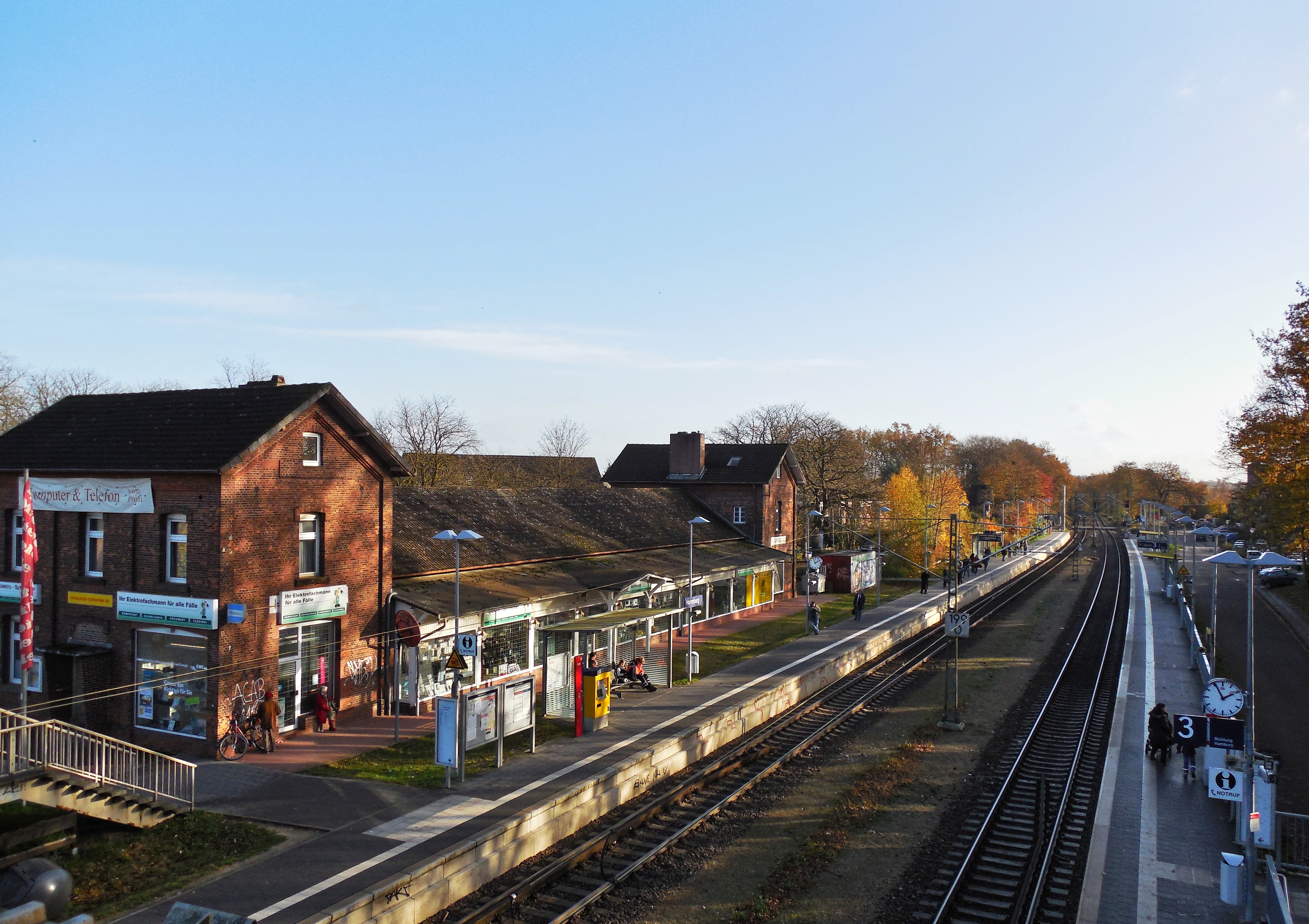
- Horneburg station in 2013

General information
- Location: Bahnhofstr. 1; 21640 Horneburg; Germany
- Coordinates: 53°30′36″N 9°34′29″E
- Lines: Regional rail Niederelbebahn Hamburg S-Bahn

Construction
- Structure type: Terrain cutting
- Parking: Park and ride
- Accessible: yes

Other information
- Station code: ds100: DB station code: 2915; Type: Category: 5
- Fare zone: HVV: D/719 and 729

History
- Opened: 1881
- Electrified: 1968

Services
Preceding station	Start	Following station
Stade towards Cuxhaven	RE 5	Buxtehude towards Hamburg Hbf
Preceding station	Hamburg S-Bahn	Following station
Dollern towards Stade	S5	Neukloster towards Elbgaustraße
Location
- Location within Lower Saxony Location within Germany Location within Europe

The rapid transit railway station Horneburg (German: Bahnhof or Haltestelle Horneburg) is located in the Horneburg village, Lower Saxony. The trains of the Hamburg S-Bahn serve the station with the line S5 from Elbgaustraße station via central station to Stade. It is also a station for the Niederelbebahn line from Hamburg to Cuxhaven.

== See also ==
- List of Hamburg S-Bahn stations
