= Horneburg (Samtgemeinde) =

- Samtgemeinde
- Location of Horneburg within Stade district
- Interactive map of Horneburg
- Location within Germany Location within Lower Saxony
- Coordinates: 53°30′N 09°35′E
- Country: Germany
- State: Lower Saxony
- District: Stade
- Seat: Horneburg
- Subdivisions: 5 municipalities

Area
  - Total: 60.02 km^{2} (23.17 sq mi)

Population (2025-12-31)
  - Total: 14,122
  - Density: 235.3/km^{2} (609.4/sq mi)
- Time zone: UTC+01:00 (CET)
  - Summer (DST): UTC+02:00 (CEST)
- Website: www.horneburg.de

Horneburg is a Samtgemeinde ("collective municipality") in the district of Stade, in Lower Saxony, Germany. Its seat is in the village Horneburg.

== Municipalities ==
The Samtgemeinde Horneburg consists of the following municipalities:

1. Agathenburg
2. Bliedersdorf
3. Dollern
4. Horneburg
5. Nottensdorf
