= Brest, Germany =

Brest
- Municipality
- Coat of arms

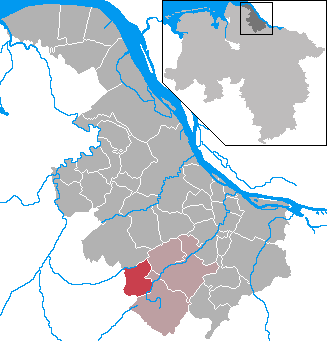
- Location of Brest within Stade district
- Interactive map of Brest
- Location within Germany Location within Lower Saxony
- Coordinates: 53°27′N 9°23′E
- Country: Germany
- State: Lower Saxony
- District: Stade
- Municipal assoc.: Harsefeld
- Subdivisions: 3

Government
  - Mayor: Dieter Tomforde (SPD)

Area
  - Total: 24.6 km^{2} (9.5 sq mi)
- Elevation: 29 m (95 ft)

Population (2025-12-31)
  - Total: 780
  - Density: 32/km^{2} (82/sq mi)
- Time zone: UTC+01:00 (CET)
  - Summer (DST): UTC+02:00 (CEST)
- Postal codes: 21698
- Dialling codes: 04762
- Vehicle registration: STD
- Website: www.brest.de

Brest (German pronunciation: [bʁɛst]) is a municipality in the district of Stade, Lower Saxony, northern Germany.

It belonged to the Prince-Archbishopric of Bremen. In 1648 the Prince-Archbishopric was transformed into the Duchy of Bremen, which was first ruled in personal union by the Swedish and from 1715 on by the Hanoverian Crown. In 1823, the Duchy was abolished and its territory became part of the Stade Region.

Brest has fewer than 800 residents. Notable people from the town include the botanist Jost Fitschen (1869-1947). The town’s present dimensions were formed in 1972 from three then-independent towns: Brest, Reith and Wohlerst.
