= Otto Schmeil =

German zoologist, botanist and educator (1860–1943)

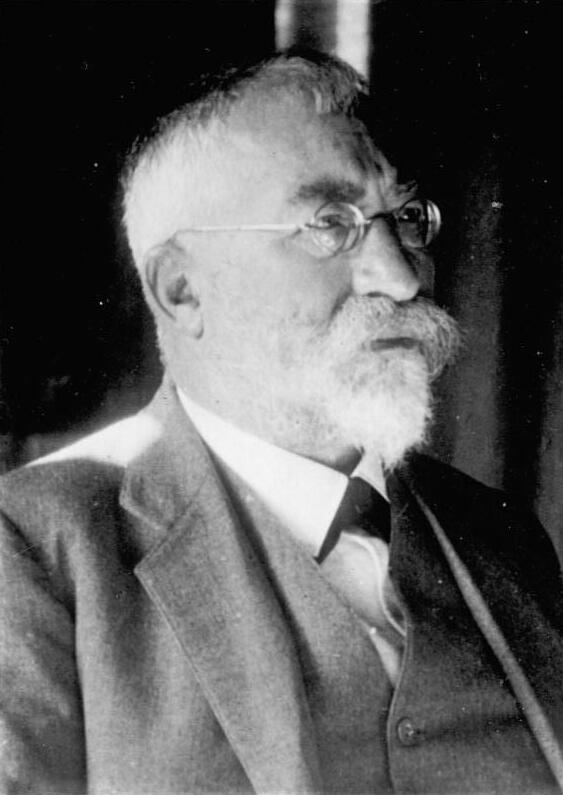
Otto Schmeil (1860–1943)

Otto Schmeil (3 February 1860, Großkugel – 3 February 1943, Heidelberg) was a German zoologist, botanist and educator. He is remembered for his reform efforts in regards to biology education; as a zoologist, he specialized in research of copepods and promoted the idea of "living communities" in nature.

Following the death of his parents, he became a student of the Francke Foundations in Halle an der Saale. Beginning in 1880, he worked as schoolteacher in the community of Zörbig, then returned to Halle as a teacher in 1883. In 1891 he obtained his doctorate in zoology at Leipzig as a student of Rudolf Leuckart, and three years later was named rector of the Wilhelmstädter Volksschule in Magdeburg. In 1904 he left the teaching profession in order to pursue a literary career.

During his tenure at Magdeburg, he focused on education reform, in particular, the teaching of biology. In this regard, he strove to move away from the literal approach of instruction, while stressing the need for students to observe nature firsthand and to discover its causal relationships. His "Über die Reformbestrebungen auf dem Gebiete des naturgeschichtlichen Unterrichts" (On reform efforts in the areas of natural history teaching) was published over several editions.

== Selected writings ==
- "Beiträge zur Kenntnis der Süsswasser-Copepoden Deutschlands mit besonderer Berücksichtigung der Cyclopiden." In: Zeitschrift für Naturwissenschaft 64, 1891 (dissertation) – Contributions to the knowledge of freshwater copepods in Germany with special emphasis on Cyclopoida.
- Deutschlands freilebende Süsswasser-Copepoden. In: Bibliotheca zoologica 1892, 1893 – German free-swimming freshwater copepods.
- Das Tierreich. Copepoda. I. Gymnoplea, Berlin 1898 (with Wilhelm Giesbrecht) – The animal kingdom. Copepoda. I. Gymnoplea.
- In 1901 Schmeil's Lehrbuch der Zoologie (1898) was translated into English and published as Text-Book of Zoology treated from a biological standpoint (Adam and Charles Black, London); translator: Rudolph Rosenstock, editor: Joseph Thomas Cunningham.
- Flora von Deutschland und seinen angrenzenden Gebieten, 1903 (with Jost Fitschen) – Flora of Germany and its neighboring regions.
- Über die Reformbestrebungen auf dem Gebiete des naturgeschichtlichen Unterrichts. sixth edition Stuttgart, 1905 – On reform efforts in the areas of natural history instruction.
- Lehrbuch der Botanik für höhere Lehranstalten und die Hand des Lehrers, sowie für alle Freunde der Natur. 28. Auflage, Quelle und Meyer, Leipzig 1911 – Textbook of botany for institutions of higher learning, etc.
- Pflanzen der Heimat Eine Auswahl der verbreitetsten Pflanzen unserer Fluren in Wort und Bild. second edition, Quelle und Meyer, Leipzig 1913 – Varieties of plants; a selection of the most common plants in text and illustrations.
