= Focus Money =

Business magazine in Germany

- Categories: Business magazine
- Frequency: Weekly
- Publisher: Focus Magazin Verlag
- Founded: 2000
- First issue: 30 March 2000; 25 years ago
- Company: Hubert Burda Media
- Country: Germany
- Based in: Munich
- Language: German
- Website: Focus Money
- ISSN: 1615-4576
- OCLC: 85602834

Focus Money (stylized in all caps) is a business magazine published in Munich, Germany. It is one of the spin-offs of the German news magazine Focus and has been in circulation since 2000.

== History and profile ==
Focus Money was first published on 30 March 2000. Its slogan was "Fakten machen Geld" (German: "Facts make money"). The magazine is part of Hubert Burda Media and is published by Focus Magazin Verlag weekly on Wednesdays. Its headquarters is in Munich.

The magazine covers articles on business, politics, companies, finance, tax, law, investment, insurance, telecommunications, motoring and careers. Its target audience is decision makers in business and in society. It annually publishes a list of major German tax consultancy and audit firms.

The first editor-in-chief of Focus Money was Manfred Schumacher who resigned from the post on 5 April 2000, only five days after the start of the magazine. Frank Pöpsel replaced him in the post.

In 2005 Focus Magazine started an e-paper, Der Vermögensverwalter (German: The Asset Manager), which is emailed to subscribers.

== Circulation ==
In 2001 Focus Money had a circulation of 149,000 copies. The magazine sold 135,751 copies during the first quarter of 2005. The circulation of the magazine was down to 142,210 copies in 2010. During the first quarter of 2015, its circulation was down to 126,846 copies. In the fourth quarter 2016 the magazine sold 123,378 copies.

== See also ==
List of magazines in Germany
