= Harsefeld (Samtgemeinde) =

Samtgemeinde in Lower Saxony, Germany

- Samtgemeinde
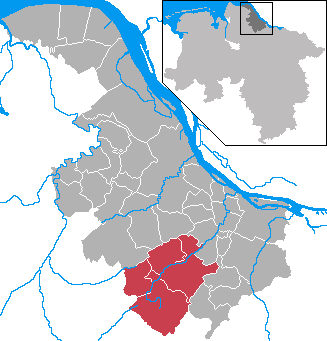
- Location of Harsefeld within Stade district
- Interactive map of Harsefeld
- Location within Germany Location within Lower Saxony
- Coordinates: 53°27′N 09°30′E
- Country: Germany
- State: Lower Saxony
- District: Stade
- Seat: Harsefeld
- Subdivisions: 4 municipalities

Area
  - Total: 165.54 km^{2} (63.92 sq mi)

Population (2025-12-31)
  - Total: 23,183
  - Density: 140.04/km^{2} (362.71/sq mi)
- Time zone: UTC+01:00 (CET)
  - Summer (DST): UTC+02:00 (CEST)
- Website: www.harsefeld.de

Harsefeld is a Samtgemeinde ("collective municipality") in the district of Stade, in Lower Saxony, Germany. Its seat is in the village Harsefeld.

The Samtgemeinde Harsefeld consists of the following municipalities:

1. Ahlerstedt
2. Bargstedt
3. Brest
4. Harsefeld
