= Horneburg =

- Municipality
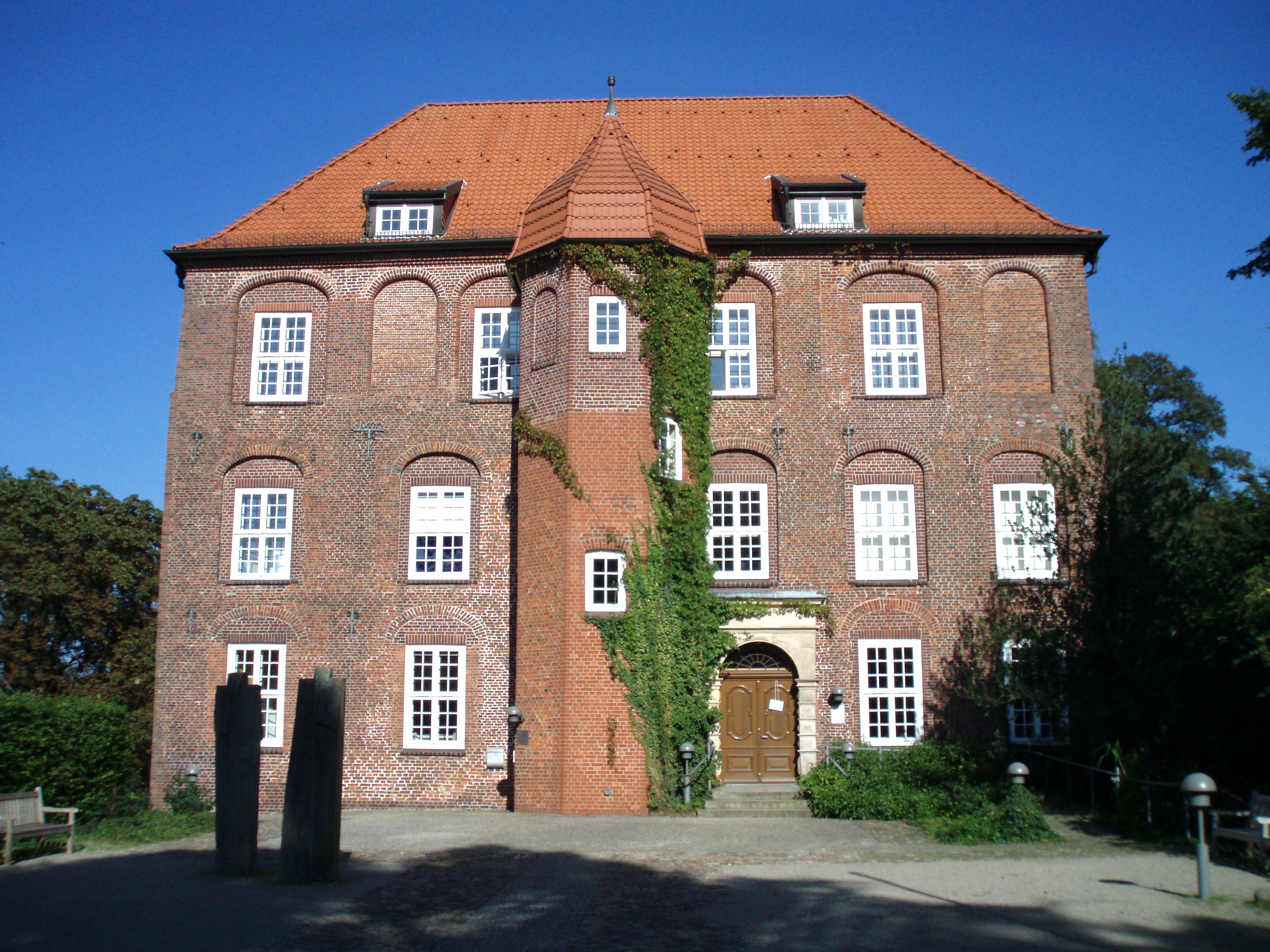
- 17th-century Agathenburg Castle which is now a museum and cultural venue

- Coat of arms

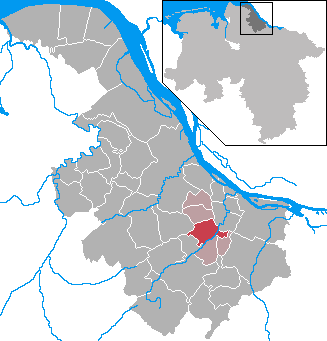
- Location of Horneburg within Stade district
- Interactive map of Horneburg
- Location within Germany Location within Lower Saxony
- Coordinates: 53°30′34″N 9°34′30″E
- Country: Germany
- State: Lower Saxony
- District: Stade
- Municipal assoc.: Horneburg

Government
  - Mayor: Hans-Jürgen Detje (CDU)

Area
  - Total: 17.13 km^{2} (6.61 sq mi)
- Elevation: 12 m (39 ft)

Population (2025-12-31)
  - Total: 6,883
  - Density: 401.8/km^{2} (1,041/sq mi)
- Time zone: UTC+01:00 (CET)
  - Summer (DST): UTC+02:00 (CEST)
- Postal codes: 21640
- Dialling codes: 04163
- Vehicle registration: STD
- Website: www.horneburg.de

Horneburg (German pronunciation: [ˈhɔʁnəbʊʁk]; Low German: Hornborg) is a municipality west of Hamburg (Germany) in the district of Stade in Lower Saxony.

Horneburg is also the seat of the Samtgemeinde ("collective municipality") Horneburg.

== History ==
Horneburg belonged to the Prince-Archbishopric of Bremen. In 1648 the Prince-Archbishopric was transformed into the Duchy of Bremen, which was first ruled in personal union by the Swedish and from 1715 on by the Hanoverian Crown. In 1823 the Duchy was abolished and its territory became part of the Stade Region.

== Concentration camp ==
During World War II a concentration camp was established in Horneburg. It was a subcamp to the Neuengamme concentration camp. From October 1944 until February 1945 about 200 Hungarian Jewish women and 50 Dutch women were forced to work making valves for the Philips-Valvo-Röhrenwerke. Dutch women were also forced to work in the port of Horneburg. The Hungarian women came from Auschwitz-Birkenau camp, the Dutch women transported from Ravensbrück concentration camp. In mid-February 1945 the SS deported the women to the subcamp Porta Westfalica. 300 Hungarian women coming from a subcamp of Groß Rosen and Auschwitz were transported to Horneburg on February 24, 1945. These women were transported to Bergen-Belsen on April 8, 1945, where they arrived on April 11.

== Memorial ==
On October 22, 1997 a memorial stone with a plaque were installed at the location of the camp, at the street crossing Vordamm/Auedamm, Horneburg.

== Transport ==
The rapid transit system of Hamburg S-Bahn—with the trains of the line S3—and the regional rail serve Horneburg at the railway station.

== See also ==
- List of subcamps of Neuengamme

== Notes ==
=== References ===
- Official German list: Verzeichnis der Konzentrationslager und ihrer Außenkommandos gemäß § 42 Abs. 2 BEG (in German)
- Memorial Neuengamme website (in German)
