= Ahlerstedt =

- Municipality
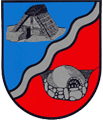
- Coat of arms

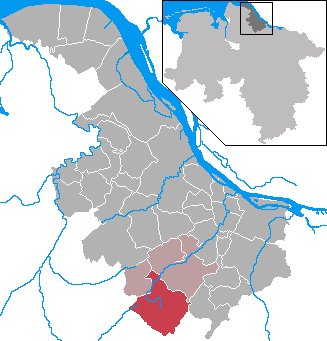
- Location of Ahlerstedt within Stade district
- Interactive map of Ahlerstedt
- Location within Germany Location within Lower Saxony
- Coordinates: 53°24′25″N 9°27′10″E
- Country: Germany
- State: Lower Saxony
- District: Stade
- Municipal assoc.: Harsefeld
- Subdivisions: 8

Government
  - Mayor: Uwe Arndt (FW)

Area
  - Total: 62.56 km^{2} (24.15 sq mi)
- Elevation: 37 m (121 ft)

Population (2025-12-31)
  - Total: 5,452
  - Density: 87.15/km^{2} (225.7/sq mi)
- Time zone: UTC+01:00 (CET)
  - Summer (DST): UTC+02:00 (CEST)
- Postal codes: 21702
- Dialling codes: 04166
- Vehicle registration: STD
- Website: www.ahlerstedt.de

Ahlerstedt (German pronunciation: [ˈaːlɐʃtɛt]) is a municipality in the District of Stade, Lower Saxony, Germany.

It belonged to the Prince-Archbishopric of Bremen. In 1648, the Prince-Archbishopric was transformed into the Duchy of Bremen, which was first ruled in personal union by the Swedish and from 1715 on by the Hanoverian Crown. In 1823 the Duchy was abolished and its territory became part of the Stade Region.

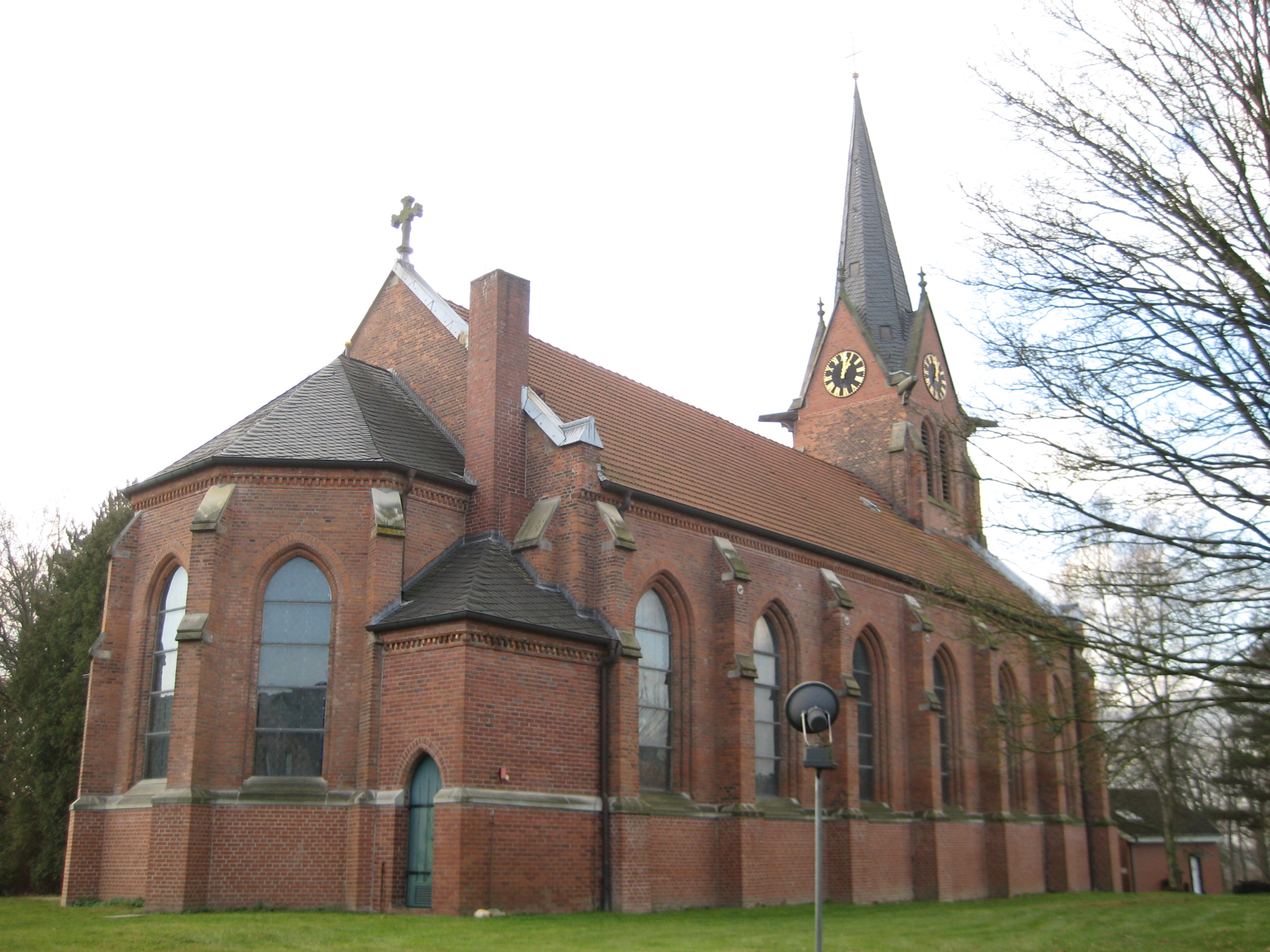
Ahlerstedt Protestant church built in 1865

== Local council ==
The local council has 17 members, according to the 2016 elections:

- FWG: 11 seats
- CDU: 3 seats
- SPD: 2 seats
- NPD: 1 seats
