= Geversdorf =

- Ortsteil of Cadenberge
- Coat of arms
- Interactive map of Geversdorf
- Location within Germany Location within Lower Saxony
- Coordinates: 53°48′N 09°05′E
- Country: Germany
- State: Lower Saxony
- District: Cuxhaven
- Municipality: Cadenberge

Area
  - Total: 21.62 km^{2} (8.35 sq mi)
- Elevation: 0–5 m (0–16 ft)

Population (2015-12-31)
  - Total: 726
  - Density: 33.6/km^{2} (87.0/sq mi)
- Time zone: UTC+01:00 (CET)
  - Summer (DST): UTC+02:00 (CEST)
- Postal codes: 21784
- Dialling codes: 04752, 04753 and 04772
- Vehicle registration: CUX

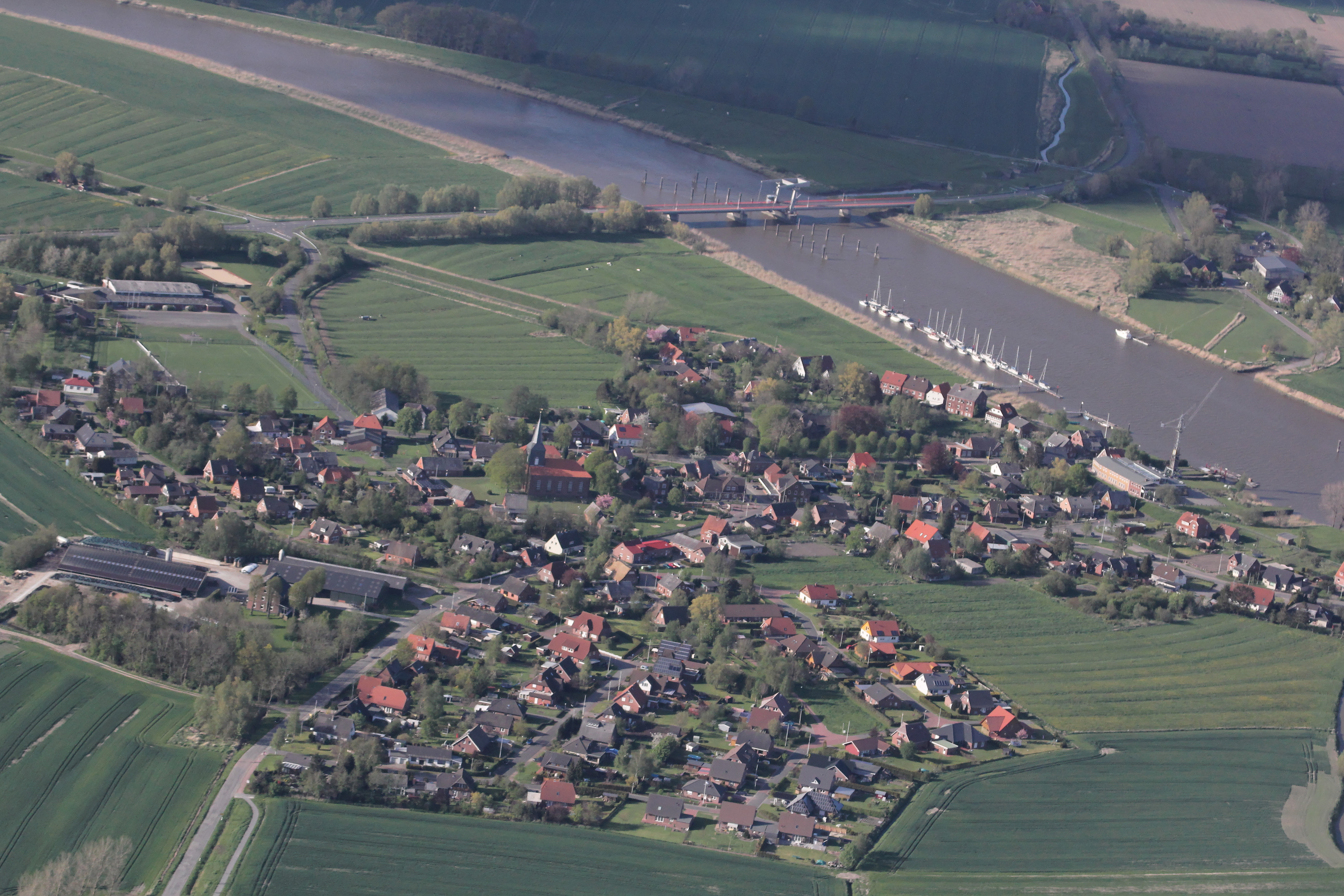
Geversdorf

Geversdorf is a village and a former municipality in the district of Cuxhaven, in Lower Saxony, Germany. Since 1 November 2016, it is part of the municipality Cadenberge.

Geversdorf belonged to the Prince-Archbishopric of Bremen, established in 1180. In 1648 the Prince-Archbishopric was transformed into the Duchy of Bremen, which was first ruled in personal union by the Swedish Crown – interrupted by a Danish occupation (1712-1715) – and from 1715 on by the Hanoverian Crown. The Kingdom of Hanover incorporated the Duchy in a real union and the Ducal territory became part of the new Stade Region, established in 1823.
