= Nottensdorf =

- Municipality
- Coat of arms

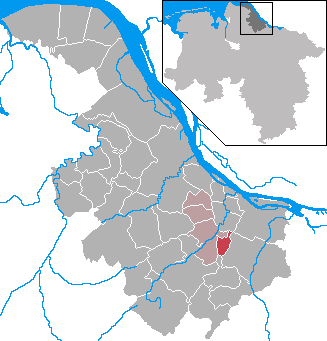
- Location of Nottensdorf within Stade district
- Interactive map of Nottensdorf
- Location within Germany Location within Lower Saxony
- Coordinates: 53°29′N 9°36′E
- Country: Germany
- State: Lower Saxony
- District: Stade
- Municipal assoc.: Horneburg

Government
  - Mayor: Hans Alpers-Janke (CDU)

Area
  - Total: 7.14 km^{2} (2.76 sq mi)
- Elevation: 22 m (72 ft)

Population (2025-12-31)
  - Total: 1,601
  - Density: 224/km^{2} (581/sq mi)
- Time zone: UTC+01:00 (CET)
  - Summer (DST): UTC+02:00 (CEST)
- Postal codes: 21640
- Dialling codes: 04163
- Vehicle registration: STD
- Website: www.horneburg.de

Nottensdorf is a municipality in the district of Stade, Lower Saxony, Germany.

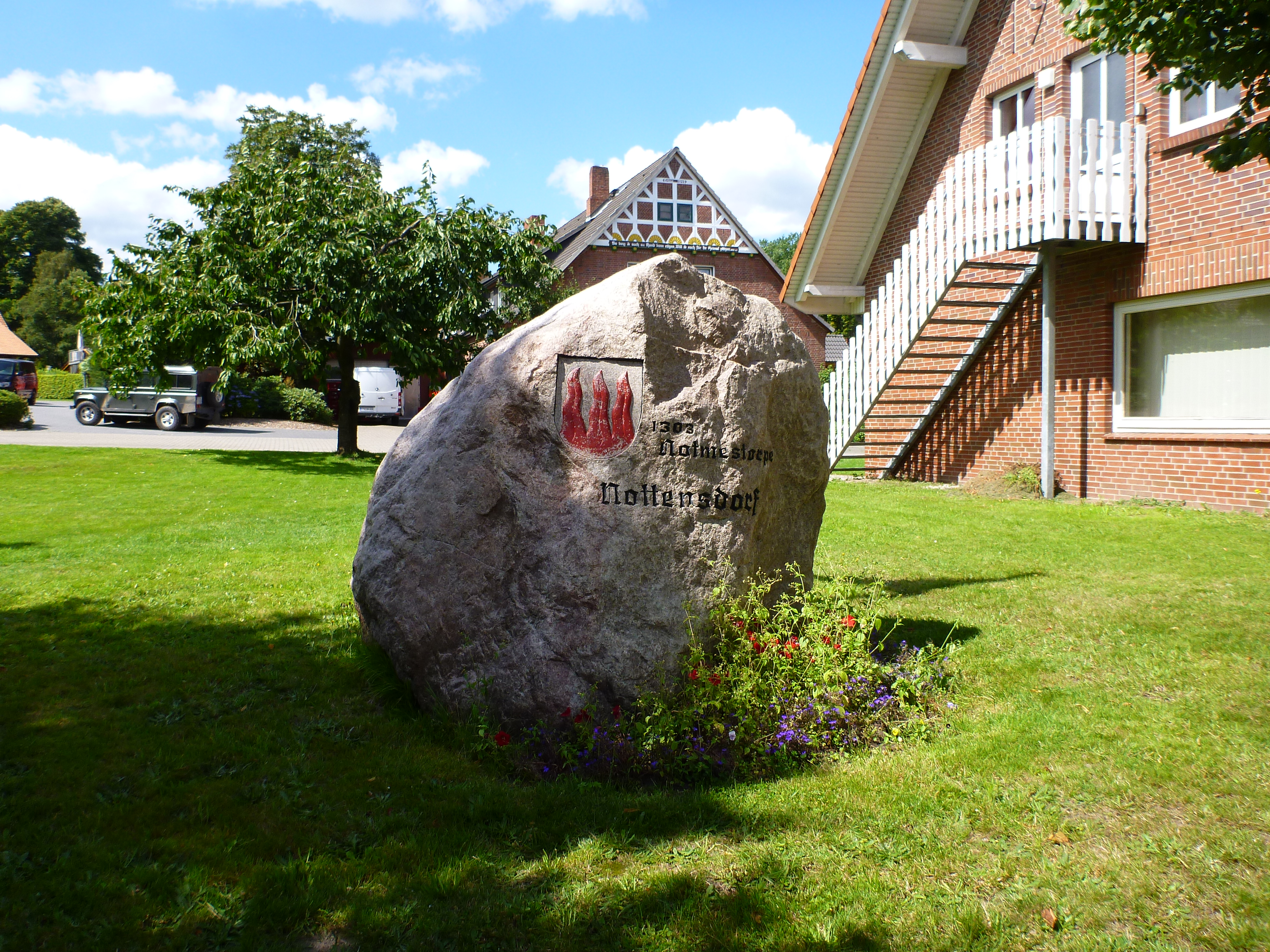
Memorial stone commemorating the historical mention of Notmestorpe, the old name of the village in 1303

== History ==
Nottensdorf belonged to the Prince-Archbishopric of Bremen, established in 1180. In 1648 the Prince-Archbishopric was transformed into the Duchy of Bremen, which was first ruled in personal union by the Swedish Crown - interrupted by a Danish occupation (1712–1715) - and from 1715 on by the Hanoverian Crown. In 1807 the ephemeric Kingdom of Westphalia annexed the Duchy, before France annexed it in 1810. In 1813 the Duchy was restored to the Electorate of Hanover, which - after its upgrade to the Kingdom of Hanover in 1814 - incorporated the Duchy in a real union and the Ducal territory, including Nottensdorf, became part of the new Stade Region, established in 1823.

In the village the grave of Hans Much can be found. On the erratic block on top of it, the inscription „HANS MUCH 1880–1932“ is visible. Around the grave, cobblestones with the names of his dogs are displayed.
