= Agathenburg =

Agathenburg Gothenborg (Low German)
- Municipality
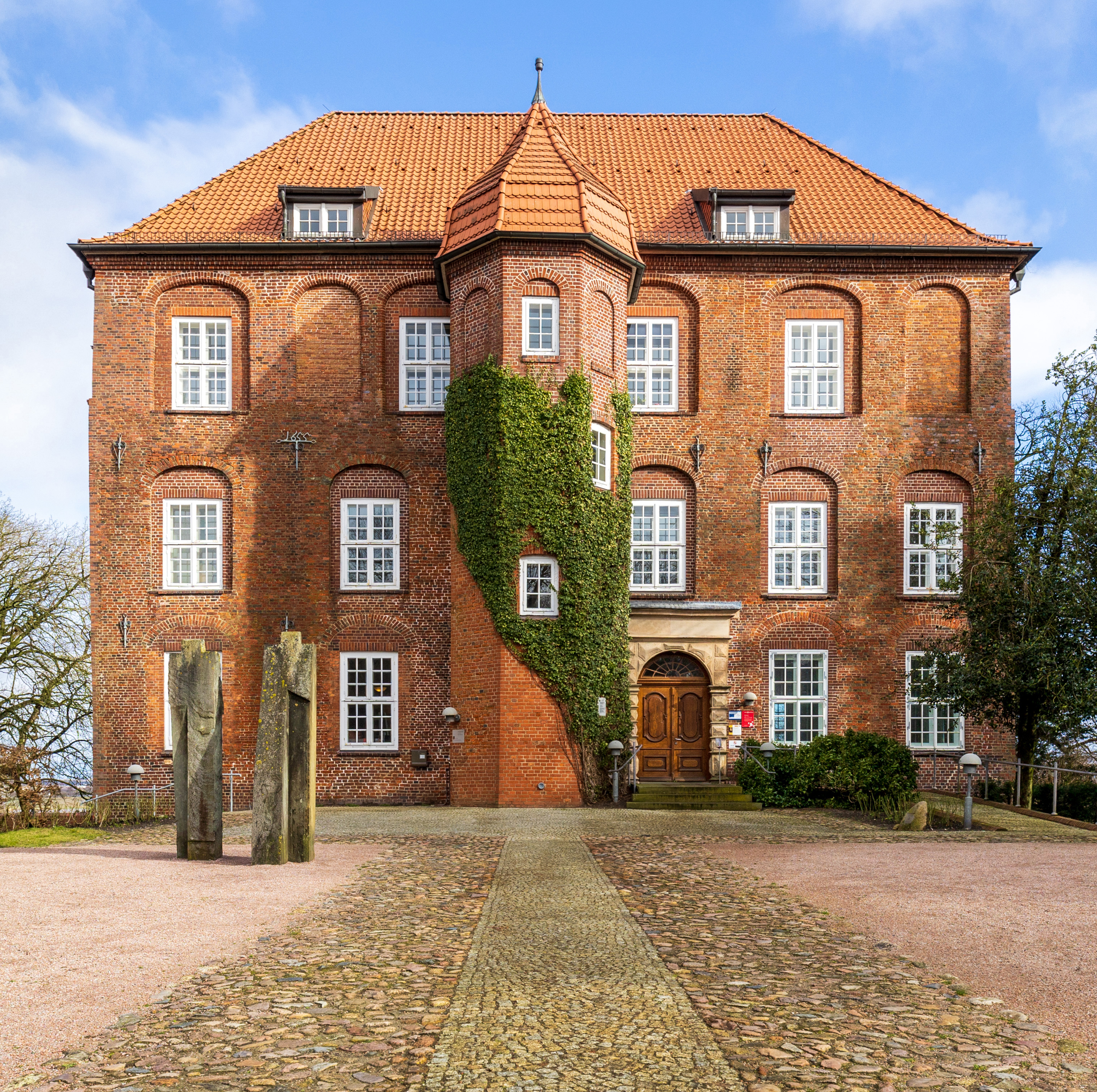
- Agathenburg Castle

- Coat of arms

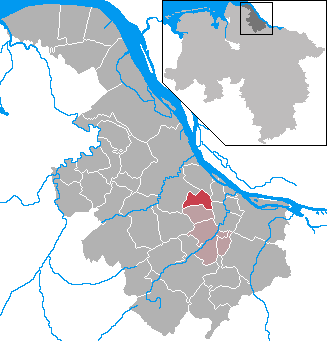
- Location of Agathenburg within Stade district
- Interactive map of Agathenburg
- Location within Germany Location within Lower Saxony
- Coordinates: 53°33′50″N 9°31′47″E
- Country: Germany
- State: Lower Saxony
- District: Stade
- Municipal assoc.: Horneburg

Government
  - Mayor: Gerd Allers

Area
  - Total: 11.32 km^{2} (4.37 sq mi)
- Elevation: 16 m (52 ft)

Population (2025-12-31)
  - Total: 1,375
  - Density: 121.5/km^{2} (314.6/sq mi)
- Time zone: UTC+01:00 (CET)
  - Summer (DST): UTC+02:00 (CEST)
- Postal codes: 21684
- Dialling codes: 04141
- Vehicle registration: STD

Agathenburg (in High German, in Low Saxon: Gothenborg) is a municipality in the district of Stade, Lower Saxony, Germany. It was formerly known as Lieth.

== History ==
Lieth, as it was originally named, belonged to the Prince-Archbishopric of Bremen, a territory of imperial immediacy established in 1180. In the mid-16th century the inhabitants of Lieth adopted Lutheranism. During the Leaguist occupation under Johan 't Serclaes, Count of Tilly, Lieth suffered from attempts of re-Catholicisation.

In 1648 the prince-archbishopric was transformed into the Duchy of Bremen, which was first ruled in personal union by the Swedish Crown – interrupted by a Danish occupation (1712–1715) – and from 1715 on by the House of Hanover. In 1807 the ephemeric Kingdom of Westphalia annexed the duchy, before France annexed it in 1810. In 1813 the Duchy of Bremen was restored to the Electorate of Hanover, which – after its upgrade to the Kingdom of Hanover in 1814 – incorporated the duchy in a real union and the ducal territory, including Agathenburg, became part of the Stade Region, established in 1823.

== Sights ==
In 1655 the ducal Bremen-Verden general governor, Hans Christoff von Königsmarck erected a castle in Lieth and named it after his wife Agathe von Leesten. The name of the castle also became the toponym of the village Lieth.

== Transport ==
The rapid transit system of Hamburg S-Bahn serves Agathenburg with a railway station.

Agathenburg is also well connected to the town of Stade through buses operated under HVV.
