= Harsefeld =

Harsefeld Harsfeld
- Municipality
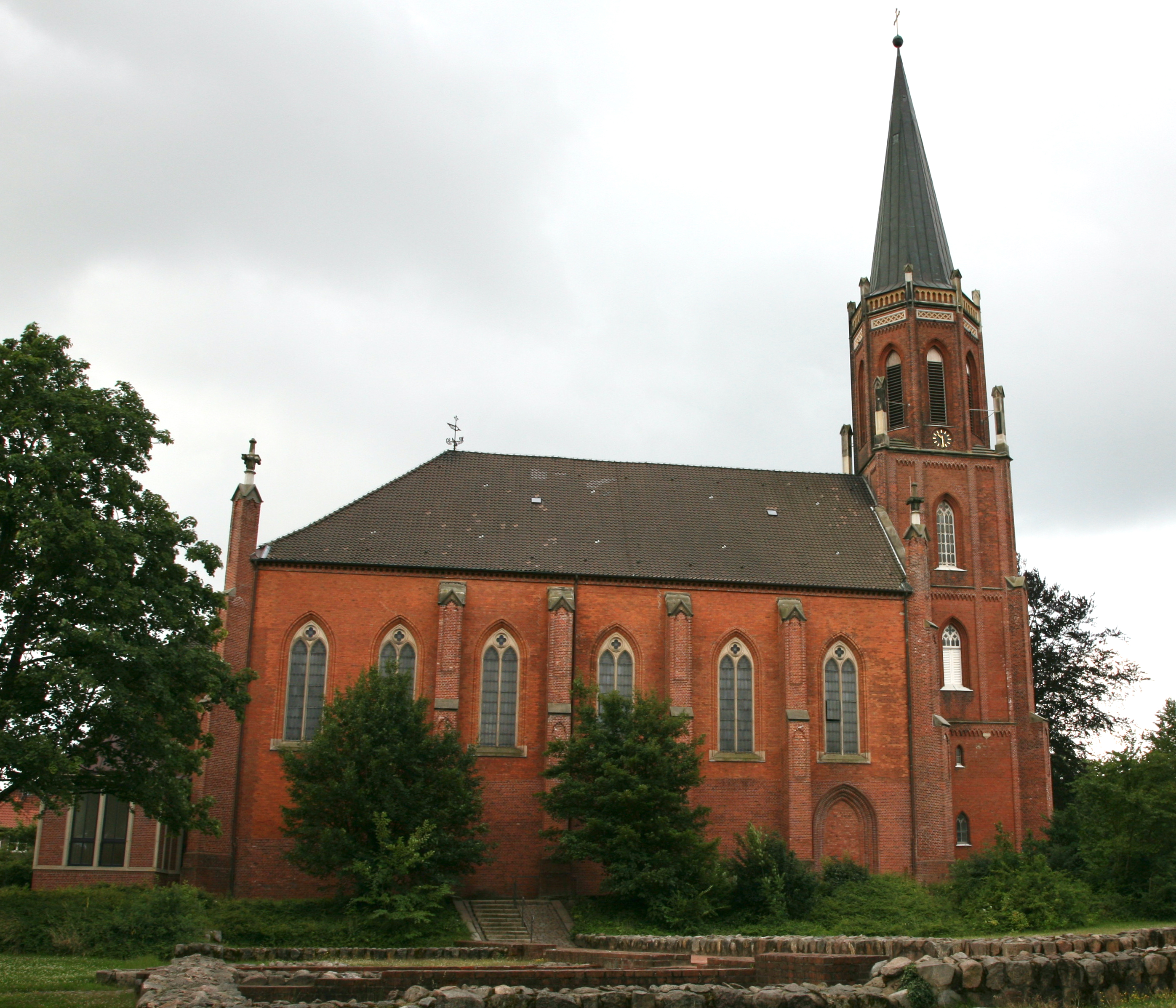
- View over the remnants of the former Archabbey towards the Lutheran church St.Marien und Bartholomäi

- Coat of arms

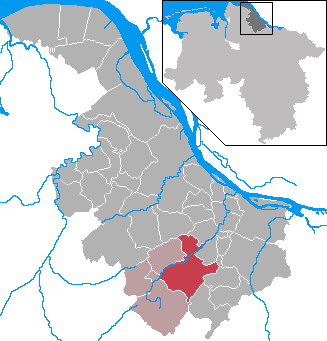
- Location of Harsefeld within Stade district
- Interactive map of Harsefeld
- Location within Germany Location within Lower Saxony
- Coordinates: 53°27′N 9°30′E
- Country: Germany
- State: Lower Saxony
- District: Stade
- Municipal assoc.: Harsefeld
- Subdivisions: 4

Government
  - Mayor: Rainer Schlichtmann

Area
  - Total: 51.81 km^{2} (20.00 sq mi)
- Elevation: 38 m (125 ft)

Population (2025-12-31)
  - Total: 14,772
  - Density: 285.1/km^{2} (738.5/sq mi)
- Time zone: UTC+01:00 (CET)
  - Summer (DST): UTC+02:00 (CEST)
- Postal codes: 21698
- Dialling codes: 04164
- Vehicle registration: STD
- Website: www.harsefeld.de

Harsefeld (in High German, in Low Saxon: Harsfeld; literally horse field) is a municipality situated south-west of Hamburg (Germany). Harsefeld has a population of c. 12,500 and belongs to the district of Stade, Lower Saxony.

Harsefeld is also the seat of the Samtgemeinde ("collective municipality") Harsefeld.

== History ==
In 1104 a Benedictine Archabbey was founded in Harsefeld, then within the Duchy of Saxony. After the carve-up of the duchy in 1180, Harsefeld belonged to the Prince-Archbishopric of Bremen, a new territory of imperial immediacy of the Holy Roman Empire. In the mid-16th century, when most inhabitants of the prince-archbishopric adopted Lutheranism, the archabbey remained a stronghold of Catholicism. During the Leaguist occupation under Tilly (1628–1630), the archabbey became a starting point for the attempts of re-Catholicisation.

In 1648 the prince-archbishopric was transformed into the Duchy of Bremen, which was first ruled in personal union by the Swedish crown. The new rulers dissolved the archabbey and most of its structures fell in ruins after 1648. From 1715 on, the House of Hanover ruled the duchy. In 1807 the ephemeric Kingdom of Westphalia annexed the Duchy, before France annexed it in 1810. In 1813 the Duchy was restored to the Electorate of Hanover, which – after its upgrade to the Kingdom of Hanover in 1814 – incorporated the Duchy in a real union and the Ducal territory, including Harsefeld, became part of the Stade Region, established in 1823.

== People born in Harsefeld ==
- Otto Albrecht von Düring (1807–1875), Justice Minister of the Kingdom of Hanover
- Jürgen Fitschen (1948– ), German banker and former co-CEO of Deutsche Bank
- Erich Prigge (1879–1955), German Army officer and military memoirist
