= Stade station =

Railway station in Stade, Germany

Stade
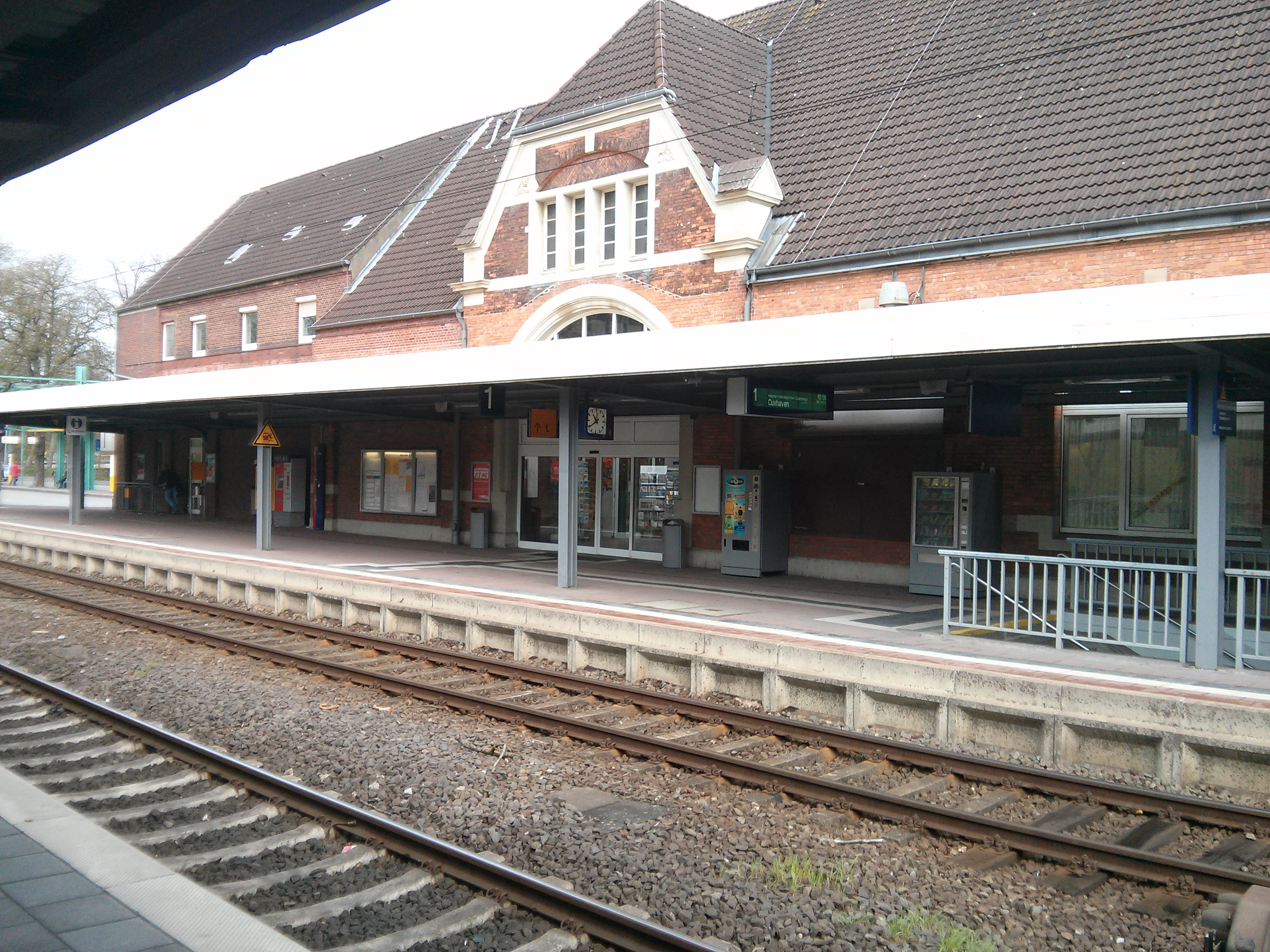

General information
- Location: Am Bahnhof 2; 21680 Stade; Germany
- Coordinates: 53°35′46″N 9°28′39″E
- Owner: DB Netz
- Operator: DB Station&Service
- Line: Lower Elbe Railway
- Platforms: 3
- Tracks: 3
- Train operators: Metronom; S-Bahn Hamburg

Construction
- Structure type: Below grade
- Parking: Park and ride
- Cycle facilities: Yes
- Accessible: yes

Other information
- Station code: ds100: DB station code: 5950; Type: Hp Category: 5
- Fare zone: HVV: E/809
- Website: www.bahnhof.de

History
- Opened: 1 April 1881; 145 years ago
- Electrified: 29 September 1968; 57 years ago

Services
Preceding station	Start	Following station
Hammah towards Cuxhaven	RE 5	Horneburg towards Hamburg Hbf
Preceding station	EVB	Following station
Hagen (Stade) towards Bremen Hbf	Moor Express	Terminus
Preceding station	Hamburg S-Bahn	Following station
Terminus	S5	Agathenburg towards Elbgaustraße
Location
- Location within Lower Saxony Location within Germany

Stade (German: Bahnhof or Haltestelle Stade) is a railway station which opened in 1881 and is located in the town of Stade, Lower Saxony, Germany. Stade station is the terminus for the rapid transit trains of Hamburg S-Bahn line S5 from Elbgaustraße station via central station, and a through station for the Metronom line from Hamburg to Cuxhaven. For the Metronom, Stade is the last station within the Hamburger Verkehrsverbund (HVV).

== Service ==
The following trains call at Stade station:

- RE 5: hourly service between Cuxhaven and Hamburg Hauptbahnhof
- Hamburg S-Bahn S5: hourly service to Pinneberg

In addition, the Moor Express heritage railway provides weekend-only service in the summer to Bremen Hauptbahnhof.

== See also ==
- List of Hamburg S-Bahn stations
