= List of Stolpersteine in Kirchlinteln =

Memorial installations in Germany

This article lists the Stolpersteine laid by the artist Gunter Demnig in Kirchlinteln.

The 10 × 10 × 10 cm concrete blocks with brass plates are set into the pavement in front of the houses where the victims once lived. The inscription on the plate provides information about their name, age, and fate. The Stolpersteine are intended to counteract the forgetting of the victims of the National Socialist reign of terror.

== Kirchlinteln ==
Name	Address	Image	Inscription	Date laid
Hinrich Heitmann	Hauptstraße 34 52.939668°N 9.319273°E	Stolperstein for Hinrich Heitmann	Here lived Hinrich Heitmann born 1898 arrested 1944 'Labor education camp' Bremen-Farge Valentin submarine bunker survived	16 May, 2011

== Neddenaverbergen ==
Name	Address	Image	Inscription	Date laid
Adolf Mautner	Zum Bergfeld 5 52.887774°N 9.365163°E	Stolperstein for Adolf Mautner	Here lived Adolf Mautner born 1886 deported 1941 murdered July 1942 in Minsk	16 May, 2011
Amalie Mautner	Zum Bergfeld 5 52.887774°N 9.365163°E	Stolperstein for Amalie Mautner	Here lived Amalie Mautner born 1879 deported 1941 murdered July 1942 in Minsk	16 May, 2011

== See also ==
- List of Stolpersteine in Adendorf
