= Westergeast =

- Village
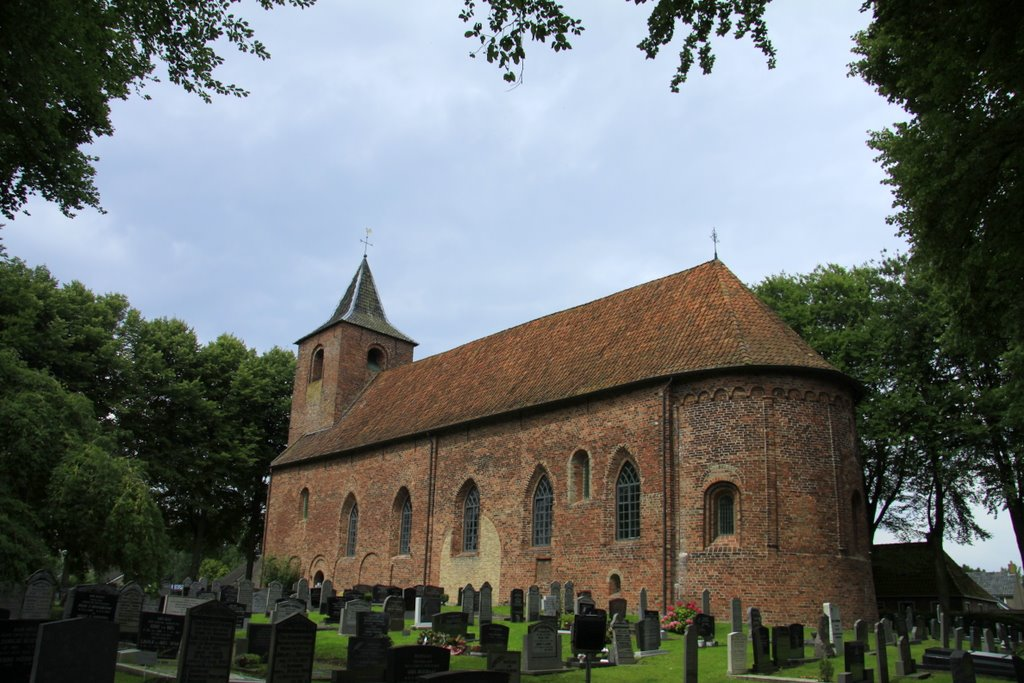
- The Dutch Reformed church of Westergeast

- Flag Coat of arms

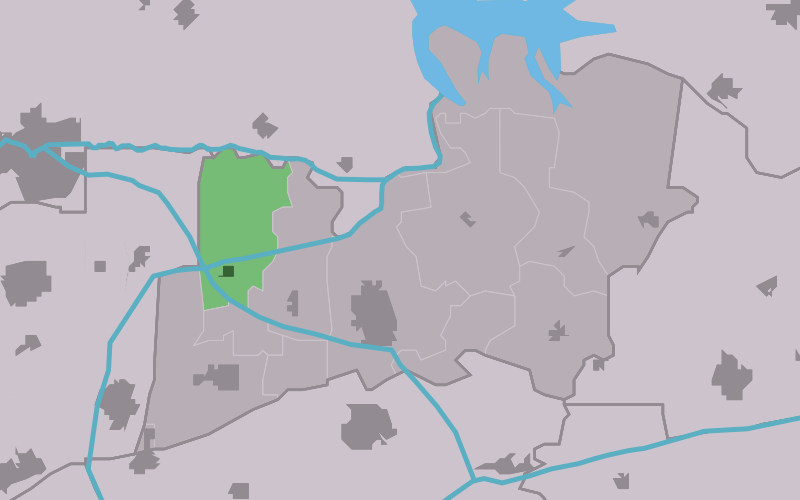
- Location in the former Kollumerland municipality

- Location in the Netherlands Westergeast (Netherlands)
- Country: Netherlands
- Province: Friesland
- Municipality: Noardeast-Fryslân

Area
  - Total: 9.83 km^{2} (3.80 sq mi)
- Elevation: 0.2 m (0.66 ft)

Population (2021)
  - Total: 610
  - Density: 62/km^{2} (160/sq mi)
- Time zone: UTC+1 (CET)
  - Summer (DST): UTC+2 (CEST)
- Postal code: 9295
- Dialing code: 0511

Westergeast (Dutch: Westergeest, Low German: Westergaist) is a village in Noardeast-Fryslân in the province of Friesland, the Netherlands. It had a population of around 621 as of January 2017. Before 2019, the village was part of the Kollumerland en Nieuwkruisland municipality.

== History ==
The village was first mentioned around 1333 as Ghaest. It is located on a slight hill (geast). The village uses west to distinguish itself with Wygeast. The Dutch Reformed church dates from 1200. In 1807, the tower was lowered. The church was restored between 1954 and 1957. Some of the stones from the tower were reused in a little woudhuisje (forest house) next to the church. The little house was demolished in 2018.

In 1840, it was home to 263 people. There is a restored windmill north of the village, De Beintemapoldermolen. It is a polder mill built in 1870. In 1950, a pumping station made the wind mill obsolete.

The village's official name was changed from Westergeest to Westergeast in 2023.

== Gallery ==
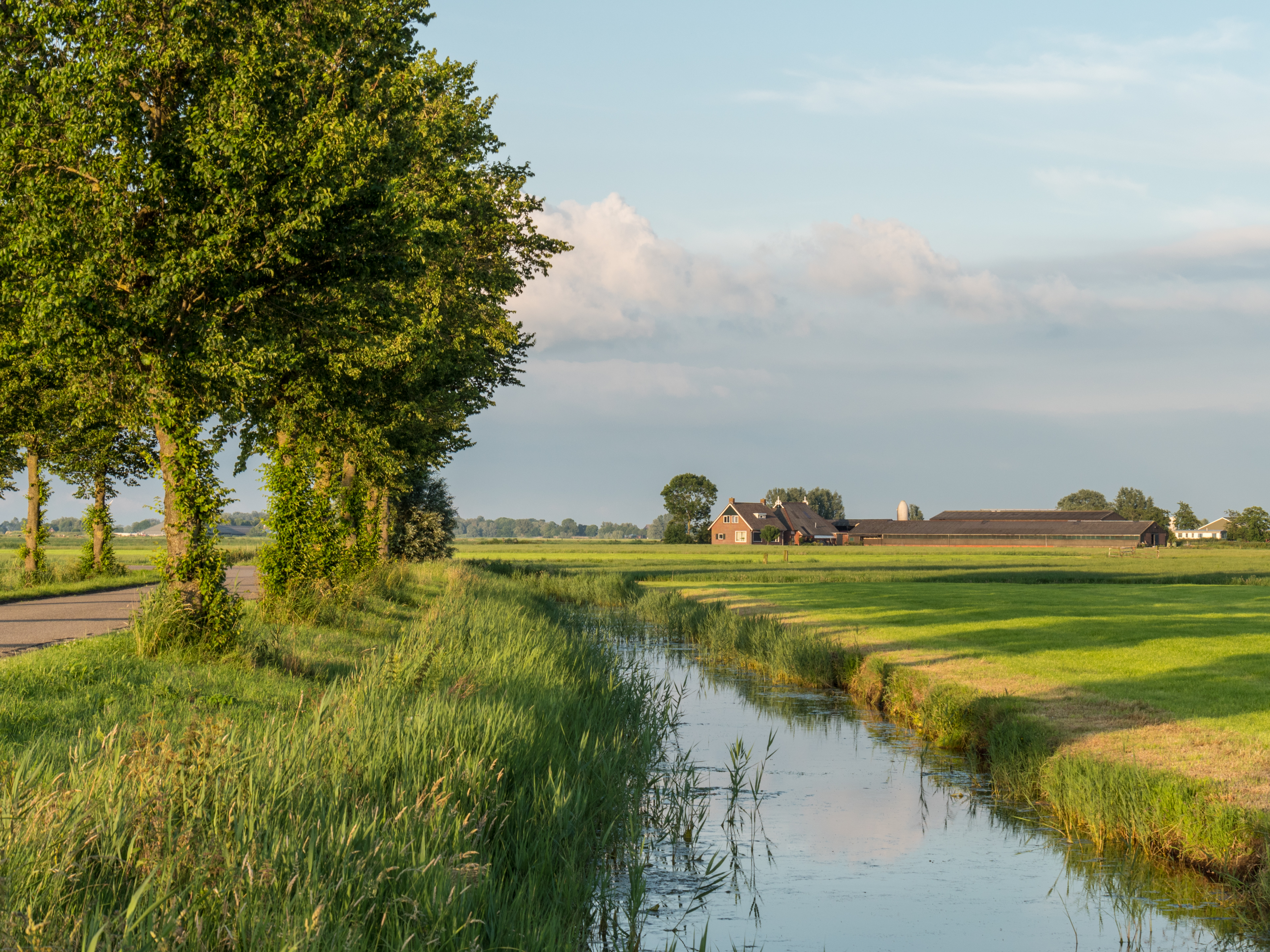
Landscape (Westergeast)

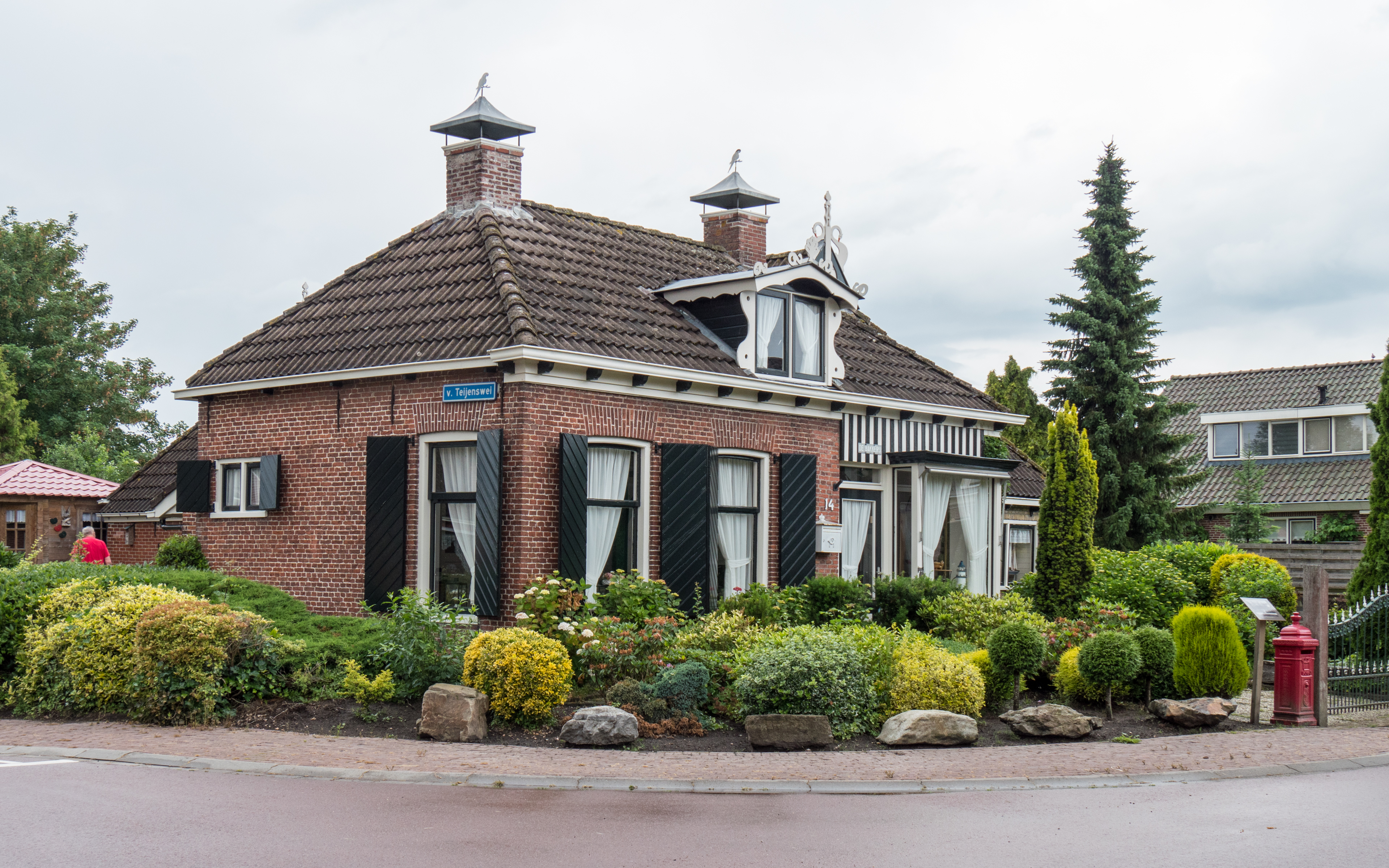
House in Westergeast

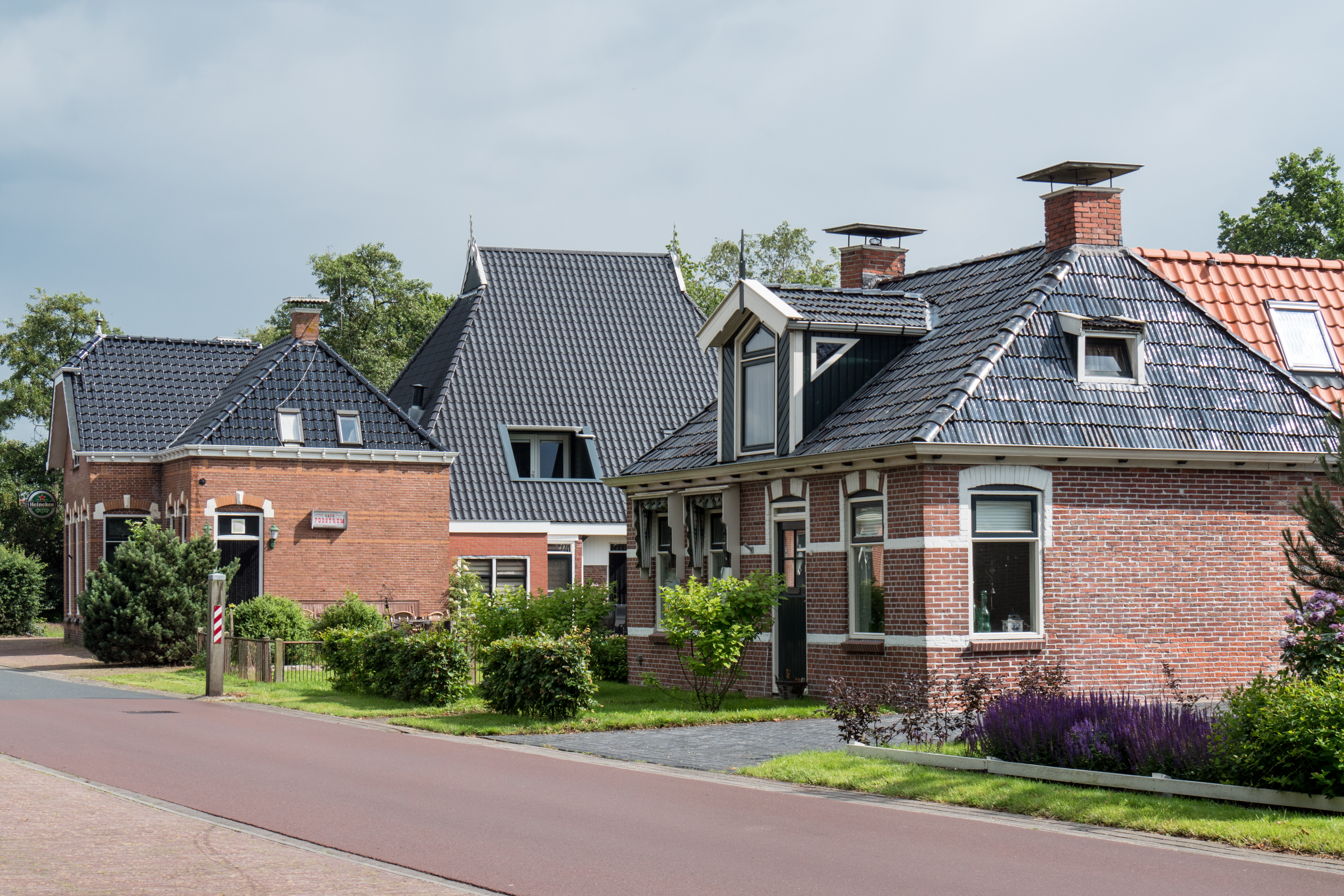
Street view

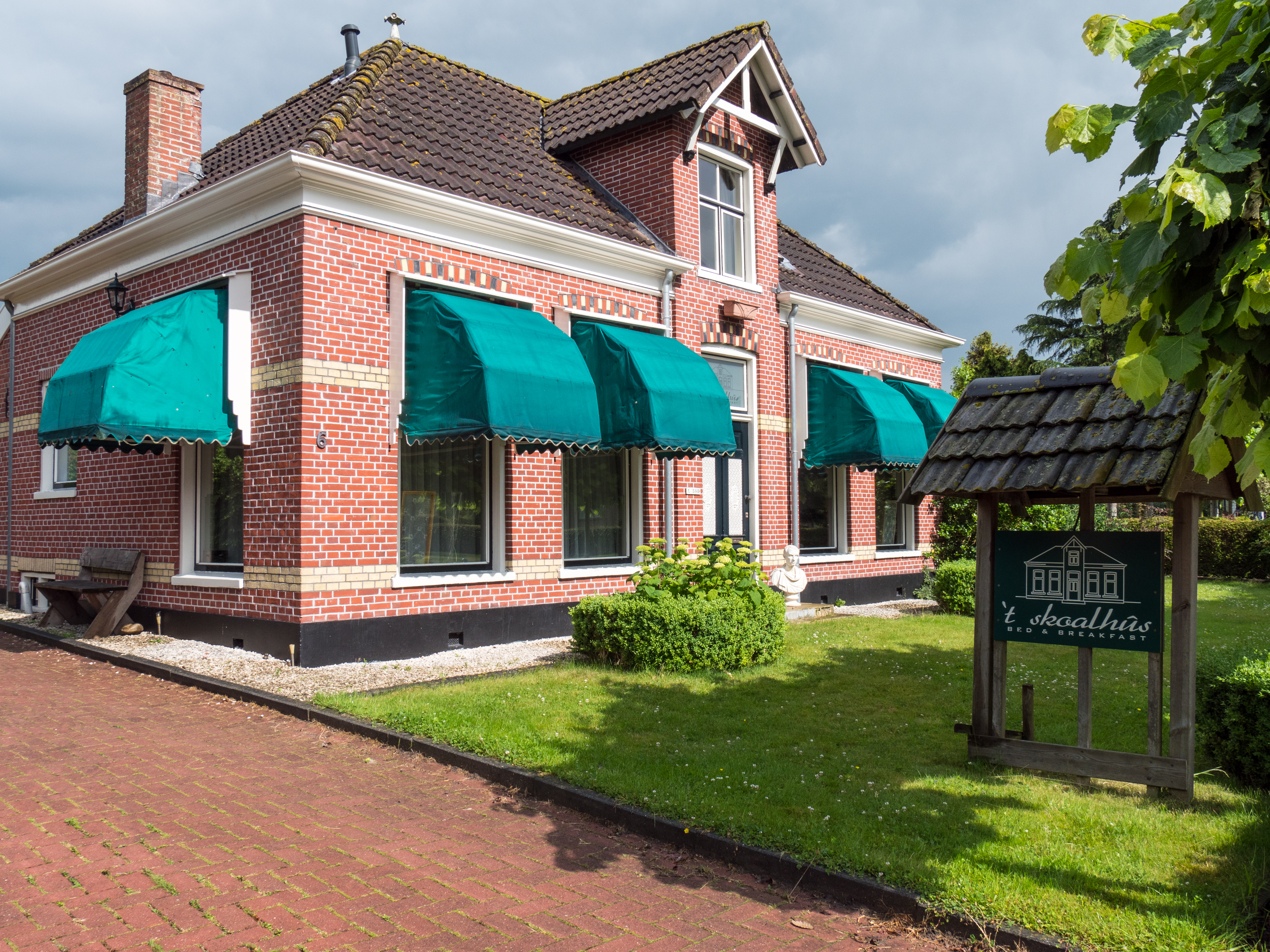
Bed & Breakfast in Westergeast
