= Tornadoes of 1942 =

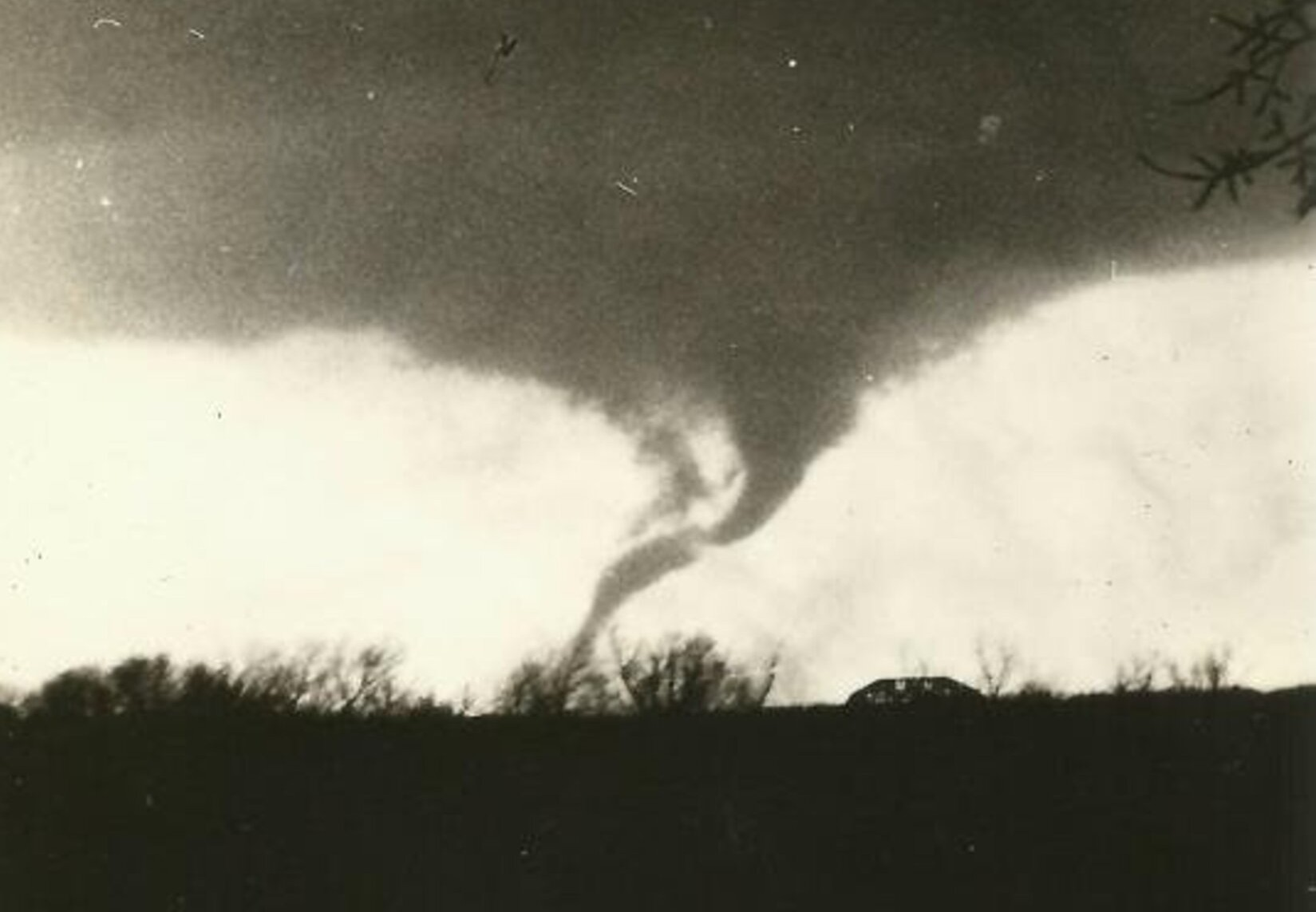
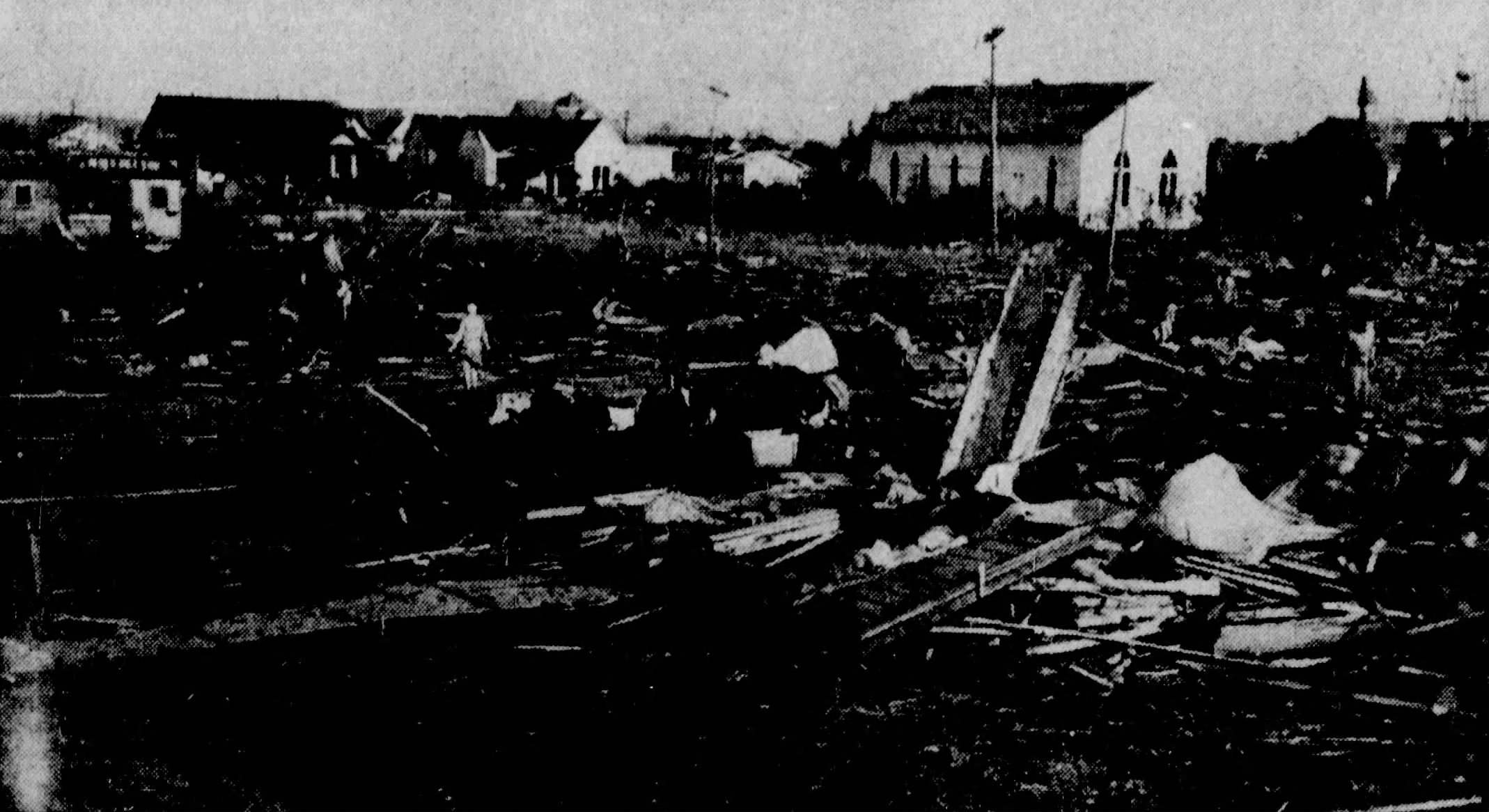
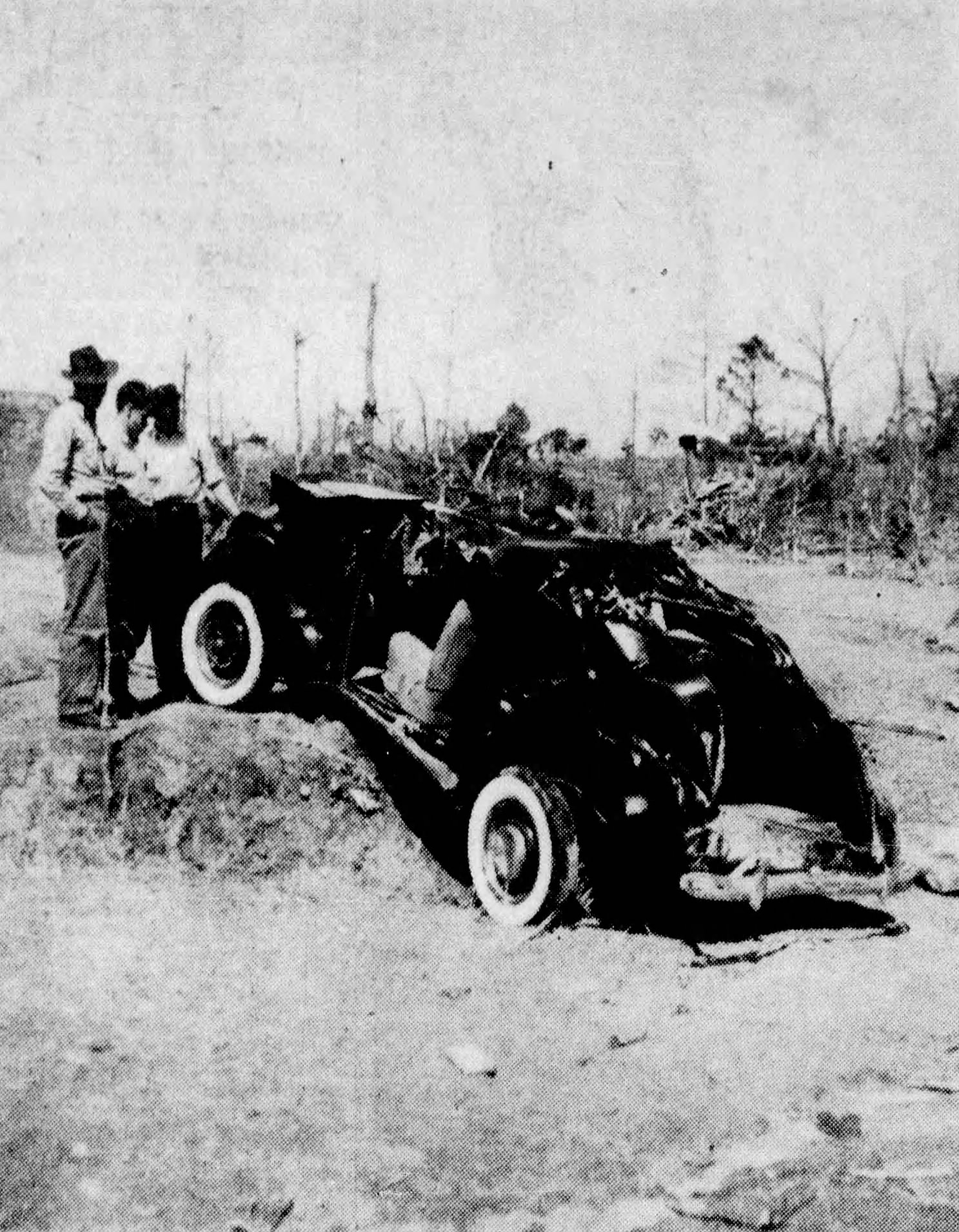
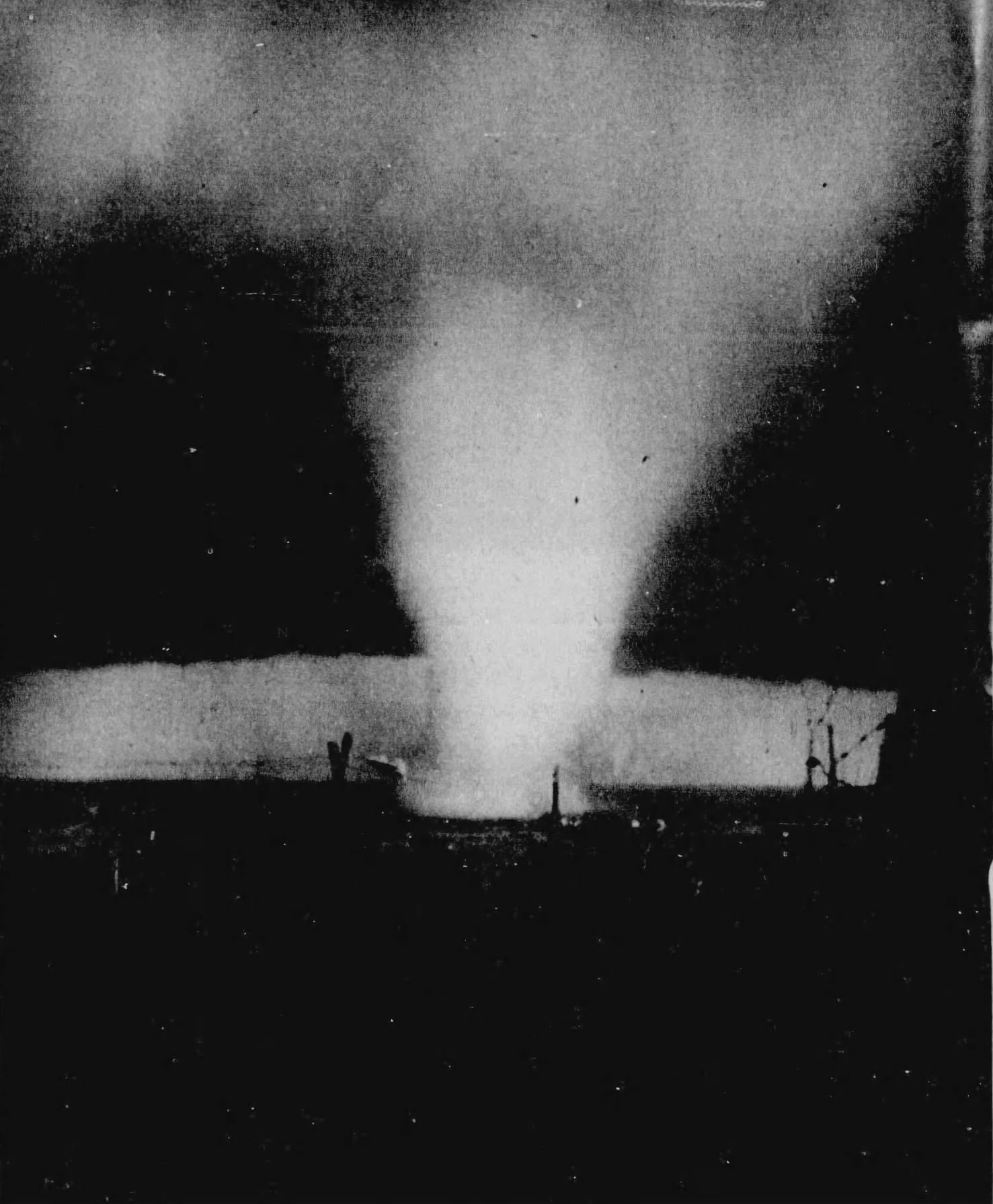
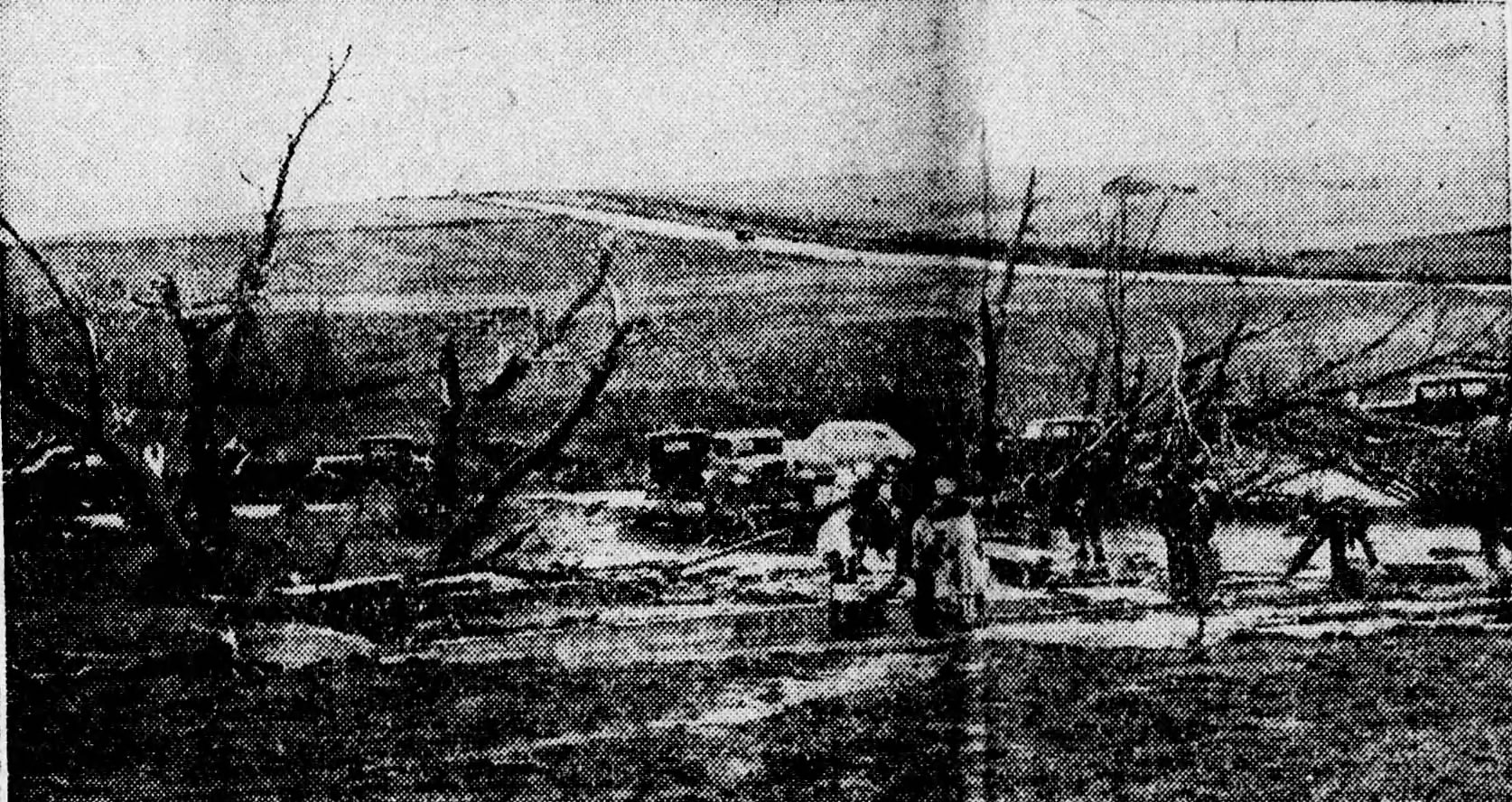
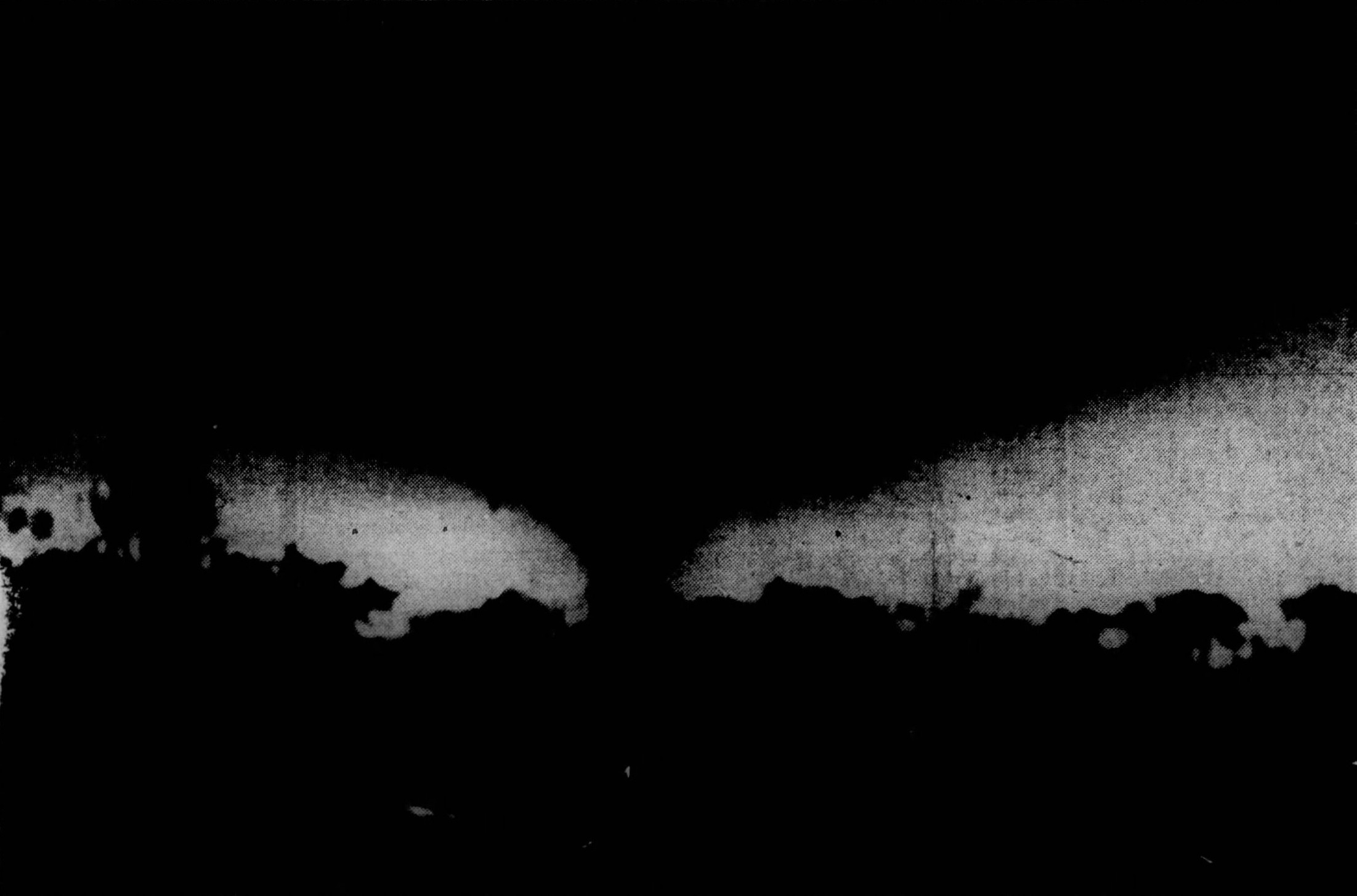
- Clockwise from top: A large F5 tornado near Chillicothe, Illinois on March 16; damage to a vehicle near O'Tuckalofa, Mississippi on March 16; F5 damage to a farm near Oberlin, Kansas after a tornado on April 29; a large and deadly F4 tornado approaching Pryor Creek, Oklahoma on April 27; a white stovepipe F2 tornado near Delphos, Kansas on May 31; damage to a home in Crowell, Texas after an F4 tornado on April 28.
- Timespan: 1942
- Maximum rated tornado: F5 tornado: Lacon, Illinois on March 16; Oberlin, Kansas on April 29
- Tornadoes in U.S.: ≥153 (Note: Totals are from Grazulis, who only lists F2 and stronger tornadoes and F1/F0 tornadoes with fatalities.)
- Fatalities (U.S.): ≥383

This page documents the tornadoes and tornado outbreaks of 1942, primarily in the United States. (Note: An outbreak is generally defined as a group of at least six tornadoes (the number sometimes varies slightly according to local climatology) with no more than a six-hour gap between individual tornadoes. An outbreak sequence, prior to (after) the start of modern records in 1950, is defined as a period of no more than two (one) consecutive days without at least one significant (F2 or stronger) tornado.) Most tornadoes form in the United States and Canada, although they can occur worldwide. Tornado counts for years prior to 1950 often appear significantly lower than in recent years due to underreporting of confirmed tornadoes; before 1950, tornadoes were not officially surveyed by the U.S. Weather Bureau (which later became the National Weather Service) and thus have no official rating. Documented significant tornadoes occurring in the pre-survey era have instead been retroactively assigned unofficial ratings by tornado experts like Thomas P. Grazulis based on reported fatalities, injuries, and damage estimates.

== Events ==
=== United States yearly total ===
Confirmed tornadoes by Fujita rating
FU	F0	F1	F2	F3	F4	F5	Total
≥2	?	≥2	≥87	≥36	≥24	≥2	≥153

Prior to 1990, there is a likely undercount of tornadoes, particularly of tornadoes rated E/F0 or E/F1, with reports of weaker tornadoes becoming more common in later eras as population increased. A sharp increase in the annual average E/F0–1 count by approximately 200 tornadoes was noted upon the implementation of NEXRAD Doppler weather radar in 1990–1991. (Note: Historically, the number of tornadoes globally and in the United States was and is still likely undercounted: research by Grazulis on annual tornado activity suggests that, as of 2001, only 53% of yearly U.S. tornadoes were officially recorded. Documentation of tornadoes outside the United States was historically less exhaustive, owing to the lack of monitors in many nations and, in some cases, to internal political controls on public information. Most countries only recorded tornadoes that produced severe damage or loss of life. Significant low biases in U.S. tornado counts likely occurred through the early 1990s, when advanced NEXRAD was first installed and the National Weather Service began comprehensively verifying tornado occurrences.) 1974 marked the first year where significant tornado (E/F2+) counts became homogenous with contemporary values, attributed to the consistent implementation of Fujita scale assessments. (Note: The Fujita scale was devised under the aegis of scientist T. Theodore Fujita in the early 1970s. Prior to the advent of the scale in 1971, tornadoes in the United States were officially unrated. Tornado ratings were retroactively applied to events prior to the formal adoption of the F-scale by the National Weather Service. While the Fujita scale has been superseded by the Enhanced Fujita scale in the U.S. since February 1, 2007, Canada used the old scale until April 1, 2013; nations elsewhere, like the United Kingdom, apply other classifications such as the TORRO scale.)

== January ==
Confirmed tornadoes by Fujita rating
FU	F0	F1	F2	F3	F4	F5	Total
?	?	?	6	1	0	0	≥7

In the first month of 1942, tornadoes killed nine people and injured 47 worldwide. The deadliest tornado of the month, an estimated F2, killed seven people and injured nine others near Bristol, Texas, on January 30. Five tenant homes were wrecked, one of them lofted 150 ft (46 m) and blown to pieces, at once killing a woman and her six children inside. January 1 featured the most tornadoes, five in all, this month, including F2s in Alabama and Tennessee that claimed a life each. Of the latter, the first destroyed 10 homes and many businesses in the Union Church–Theodore area, while the second wrecked a tenant home and eight barns southeast of Clarksville. Unconfirmed tornadoes may have occurred this day as well, primarily near Hattiesburg, Mississippi. The strongest and longest-lived tornado of the month, rated F3, also occurred this day near Deer Park, Alabama, destroying a large home and long swaths of timber. Its path was 15 mi (24 km) long.

=== January 1 (Finland and Germany) ===
A pair of tornadoes occurred in northern Europe this day: an estimated F0 near Kangasala, Finland, and an unrated event near Kreepen, Germany.

== February ==
Confirmed tornadoes by Fujita rating
FU	F0	F1	F2	F3	F4	F5	Total
?	?	?	18	4	0	0	≥22

February yielded nine deadly tornadoes that claimed 22 lives in all, injuring 330 people. All known tornadoes occurred in an outbreak during the first week of the month.

=== February 5–6 ===
FU	F0	F1	F2	F3	F4	F5	Total
?	?	?	18	4	0	0	≥22

A widespread outbreak affected the South from Arkansas to Georgia. The deadliest tornadoes of the event, a pair of F3s, killed half a dozen people each in the latter state on February 6, injuring 95 people in all. The first of these struck Carmel, Meriwether County, destroying eight homes, along with much timber and many barns, and killing three people in one of them. The second, probably a family, killed three pupils and their teacher at the Griggs Chapel school in eastern Jasper County. Despite the casualties, both tornadoes hit rural areas. Another F3 tracked 25 mi (40 km) between Congo and Little Rock, Arkansas, the previous day, killing three people and injuring 19. In his 1993 study, Grazulis ranked this outbreak twenty-eighth on a list of events producing 20 or more "significant" (F2 or stronger) tornadoes since 1880.

== March ==
Confirmed tornadoes by Fujita rating
FU	F0	F1	F2	F3	F4	F5	Total
2	?	?	11	14	6	1	≥34

March featured 19 killer tornadoes, mostly related to a major outbreak mid-month that claimed 149 lives. An F3 tornado hit between Cedar Hill and Adams, Tennessee, on March 11, obliterating a small farmhouse and killing two occupants, as well as wrecking other small homes and barns. 10 injuries were reported.

=== March 16–17 ===
FU	F0	F1	F2	F3	F4	F5	Total
2	0	0	8	13	6	1	≥30

A potent outbreak between the Upper Midwest and the Gulf Coast generated seven violent (F4 or stronger) tornadoes, including an F5 that obliterated homes in and near Lacon, Illinois, on March 16, killing seven people and injuring 70. The deadliest tornado of the event, part of a long-lived family, tracked across much of northern Mississippi that day, causing F4 damage, killing 63 people, and injuring 500. Another long-tracked F4 tore apart rural areas between Bethel Springs and Beacon, Tennessee, killing 15 and injuring 200. A trio of intense tornadoes in Kentucky, one of them F4, killed 24 and injured 110. The first tornado of the outbreak, also rated F4, claimed 11 lives around noon in Champaign and Vermilion counties, Illinois, injuring 60 others. Numerous strong tornadoes, some long-lived, also affected other areas of these states. Other intense tornadoes hit Alabama, Indiana, and South Carolina, killing four more people. With 18 killer tornadoes, the outbreak was ranked eighth on a list of comparable events since 1880. In all, at least 1,312 people were injured.

== April ==
Confirmed tornadoes by Fujita rating
FU	F0	F1	F2	F3	F4	F5	Total
?	?	2	5	3	4	1	≥14

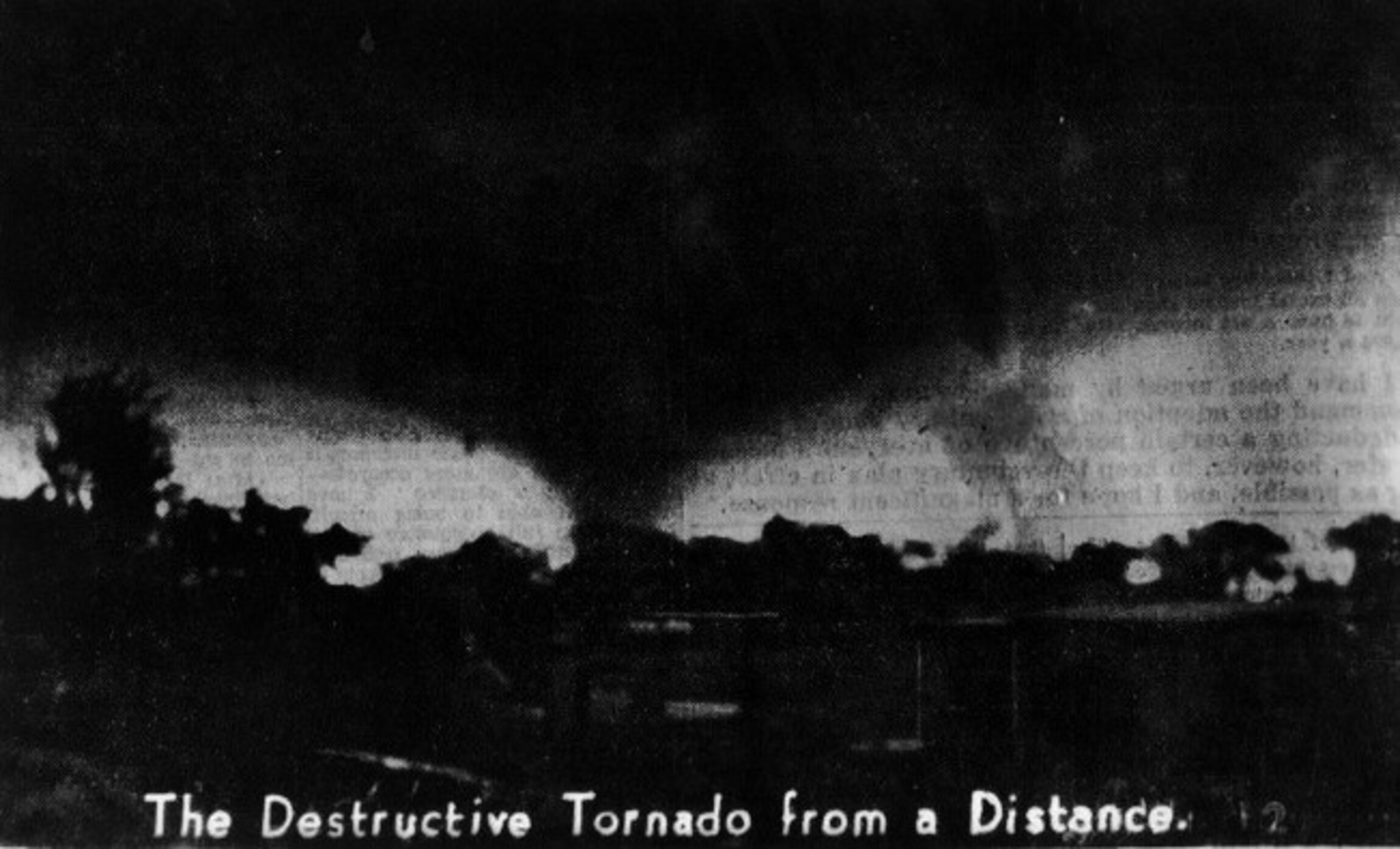
A large F4 tornado approaching Pryor Creek, Oklahoma on April 27.

While less active than March, April was nearly as deadly, with at least 92 fatalities, mostly by an F4 tornado that hit Pryor Creek, Oklahoma, or simply Pryor, on April 27, killing 52 and injuring 350. Another F4, considered a likely F5 by Grazulis, obliterated large parts of Crowell, Texas, on April 28, killing 11 and injuring 250. An F5 tornado near Oberlin, Kansas, on April 29 killed 15 people—the deadliest calamity to befall this rural area since the Cheyenne raids in 1878. Early the next morning a large F4 ravaged six farms near Eads, Colorado, killing four and injuring 12. Three more intense tornadoes this month killed seven in all: an F4 near Talala, Oklahoma, on April 27 that killed four; an F3 near Ortonville, Minnesota, the same day that killed two; and an F3 near Kidder, South Dakota, two days later that killed one. A pair of F1s collectively were responsible for a few more deaths: one in Breckenridge, Texas, on April 23 and another near Glasgow, Missouri, on April 27. An F2 near Castlewood, South Dakota, claimed a life on April 30 as well.

== May ==
Confirmed tornadoes by Fujita rating
FU	F0	F1	F2	F3	F4	F5	Total
?	?	?	13	12	9	0	≥34

All fatalities this month were attributable to a pair of outbreaks that claimed 38 lives. In addition, significant tornadoes formed on a smattering of other dates: May 6, 10, 11, 17, 27, and 29–31. Among them was an F4 that annihilated an eight-room farmhouse near Silverton, Texas, on May 29, along with another F4 that destroyed six farmsteads near Delphos, Kansas, at month's end. A large, high-end F3 along the Minnesota–Iowa border on May 30 struck a few farms at "near-F4" intensity. Other F3s hit near Bradshaw, Nebraska, on May 11 and near Guymon, Oklahoma, on May 31.

=== May 2 ===
FU	F0	F1	F2	F3	F4	F5	Total
?	?	?	1	1	6	0	≥8

Localized but intense, this outbreak spawned a series of long-tracked, violent tornadoes, ranging from 30 to 85 mi (48 to 137 km) in length, across northeastern Oklahoma and southeastern Kansas, the first of which was a 1-mile-wide (1.6 km) tornado family, the longest-tracked this day, that hit Pawhuska, Oklahoma, killing three people and injuring 38. The next, also a family, killed seven and injured 20 northwest of Tulsa. The third and deadliest, a family as well, killed 16 people—a dozen of them near Chilesville, Okfuskee County—injuring 80. The remaining F4s, a few long-lived, occurred in Kansas, killing three more and injuring 35. Additionally, an F3 tornado family this day struck Franklin, Illinois, claiming a life and injuring a dozen people.

=== May 12–13 ===
FU	F0	F1	F2	F3	F4	F5	Total
?	?	?	5	8	1	0	≥14

A multi-day outbreak overspread the Upper Midwest, starting just beyond in Nebraska. Numerous long-lived, intense tornadoes occurred, the worst of which, an F4, killed six people and injured 10 near Ewing, Nebraska, on May 12. The same day an F3 on the Nebraska–South Dakota border severely damaged eight farmhouses, injuring seven, and another near Madrid, Nebraska, obliterated a farmstead at "near-F4" intensity, injuring three. An F3 tornado family that day also passed near Weissert, Nebraska, injuring three more. The next day intense tornadoes hit Wisconsin and Minnesota, the deadliest an F3 family in Black River Falls, Wisconsin, that killed one and injured another.

=== May 31 ===
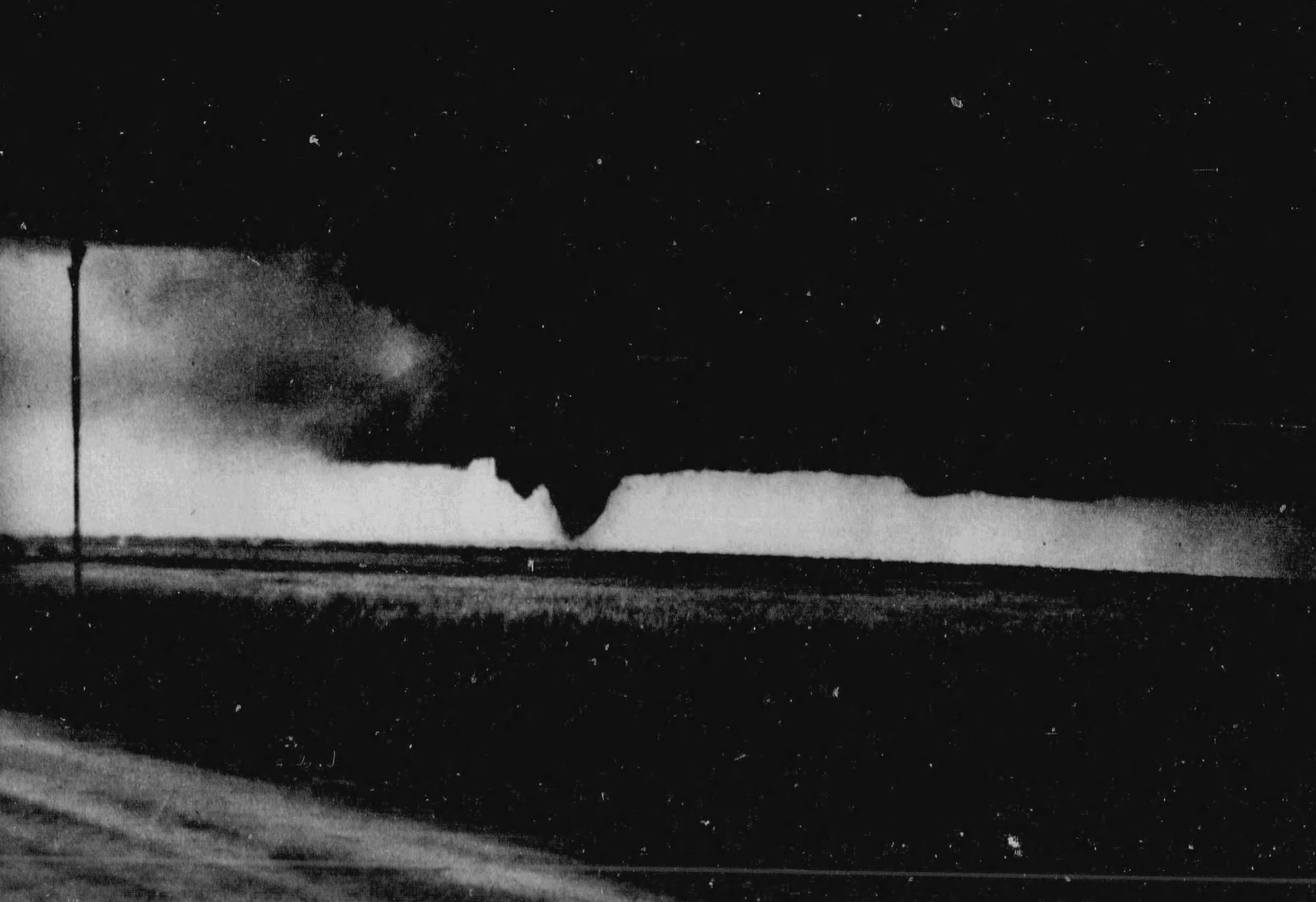
A large F4 tornado south of Delphos, Kansas on May 31

Three tornadoes touched down across North-central Kansas, including a large F4 tornado south of Delphos, which swept away a farm home, while destroying half a dozen more. An F2 tornado formed shortly after the F4 tornado lifted, with the tornado being described as being "Milky White" in appearance. The tornado destroyed outbuildings on four farms.

== June ==
Confirmed tornadoes by Fujita rating
FU	F0	F1	F2	F3	F4	F5	Total
?	?	?	11	0	4	0	≥15

The deadliest tornado this month was an F4 that meandered 2 1/4 mi (3.6 km) over southwestern Oklahoma City, killing 35 people and injuring 100, 29 of whom were hospitalized. 73 homes were wrecked—many leveled, some smaller obliterated—and 31 damaged, with losses totaling $500,000. The tornado was the deadliest to hit Oklahoma City until an F5 on May 3, 1999, killed 36. On June 20, another F4 curled past Mulvane, Kansas, killing four and injuring 10, and the same day a third F4 hit Kokomo, Indiana, killing three and injuring 150. Five days later an F2 near Wheatland, Wyoming, killed two and injured four.

=== June 17 (France) ===
A probable tornado affected Tarare, Vichy France, resulting in "massive destruction", in part due to hail.

== July ==
Confirmed tornadoes by Fujita rating
FU	F0	F1	F2	F3	F4	F5	Total
?	?	?	2	0	0	0	≥2

Only a few tornadoes were confirmable, both rated F2: one near Belmond, Iowa, on July 5 and another near Hancock, Wisconsin, on July 28.

=== July 1 (Germany) ===
A tornado was reported near Emden.

=== July 5 (Soviet Union) ===
An F0 tornado affected Dvoryšča, Byelorussian SSR.

=== July 10 (Germany) ===
An F1/T3 tornado hit Stadtilm.

=== July 15 (United Kingdom) ===
An unrated tornado hit Loch Cill an Aonghais, Scotland.

== August ==
Confirmed tornadoes by Fujita rating
FU	F0	F1	F2	F3	F4	F5	Total
?	?	?	2	0	0	0	≥2

Two significant tornadoes occurred this month. The first unroofed a home near Deer Park, Maryland, on August 17. The other, generated by a hurricane, injured 16 people at Center, Texas, on August 22.

=== August 1 (United Kingdom) ===
An F1/T2 tornado hit Barmouth, Wales.

== September ==
Confirmed tornadoes by Fujita rating
FU	F0	F1	F2	F3	F4	F5	Total
?	?	?	3	0	0	0	≥3

Only three significant tornadoes were confirmable: one near Edson, Wisconsin, on September 17; another at Plainville, Connecticut, on September 24; and a third at Carysbrook, Virginia, on September 27.

=== September 2 (Italy) ===
A waterspout, hitting Savona, shattered beachfront cabins, pieces of which landed atop buildings and on a railway.

== October ==
Confirmed tornadoes by Fujita rating
FU	F0	F1	F2	F3	F4	F5	Total
?	?	?	3	0	1	0	≥4

Only four significant tornadoes were verifiable, all on a single day. An extremely violent F4 obliterated many homes in Berryville, Arkansas, on October 29, killing 29 people and injuring 100. That day an F2 near Mena injured six, and another F2 near Bedison, Missouri, injured eight. A third F2 near Dardanelle, Arkansas, injured one more.

=== October 14 (United Kingdom) ===
An unrated tornado hit Haughley.

=== October 16 (Denmark) ===
An F0/T1 tornado at Føllenslev unroofed a hay barrack.

== November ==
Confirmed tornadoes by Fujita rating
FU	F0	F1	F2	F3	F4	F5	Total
?	?	?	1	0	0	0	≥1

Only one significant tornado occurred: an F2 that wrecked a few barns near Parker, Kansas, on November 16.

== December ==
Confirmed tornadoes by Fujita rating
FU	F0	F1	F2	F3	F4	F5	Total
?	?	?	10	1	0	0	≥11

December featured the most activity since June. The deadliest tornado this month, an F2, killed five people and injured 13 near Arlam, Texas, on December 26. Four days prior another F2 killed two and injured four near Maringouin, Louisiana. At month's start a pair of F2s claimed a life each in the Carolinas. The most intense tornado this month, rated F3, injured 15 near Cookville, Texas, on December 26.

=== December 15 (United Kingdom) ===
An F0/T1 tornado hit Malvern Wells.

== Sources ==
- Agee, Ernest M.; Childs, Samuel (June 1, 2014). "Adjustments in Tornado Counts, F-Scale Intensity, and Path Width for Assessing Significant Tornado Destruction". Journal of Applied Meteorology and Climatology. 53 (6). American Meteorological Society: 1494–1505. Bibcode:2014JApMC..53.1494A. doi:10.1175/JAMC-D-13-0235.1.
- Brooks, Harold E. (April 2004). "On the Relationship of Tornado Path Length and Width to Intensity". Weather and Forecasting. 19 (2): 310–19. Bibcode:2004WtFor..19..310B. doi:10.1175/1520-0434(2004)019<0310:OTROTP>2.0.CO;2.
- Cook, A. R.; Schaefer, J. T. (August 2008). "The Relation of El Niño–Southern Oscillation (ENSO) to Winter Tornado Outbreaks". Monthly Weather Review. 136 (8): 3121–3137. Bibcode:2008MWRv..136.3121C. doi:10.1175/2007MWR2171.1.
- Edwards, Roger; LaDue, James G.; Ferree, John T.; Scharfenberg, Kevin; Maier, Chris; Coulbourne, William L. (May 1, 2013). "Tornado Intensity Estimation: Past, Present, and Future". Bulletin of the American Meteorological Society. 94 (5). American Meteorological Society: 641–653. Bibcode:2013BAMS...94..641E. doi:10.1175/BAMS-D-11-00006.1.
- Grazulis, Thomas P. (May 1984). Violent Tornado Climatography, 1880–1982. OSTI (Technical report). NUREG. Washington, D.C.: Nuclear Regulatory Commission. OSTI 7099491. CR-3670.
  - — (July 1993). Significant Tornadoes, 1680–1991: A Chronology and Analysis of Events. St. Johnsbury, Vermont: Environmental Films. ISBN 1-879362-03-1.
  - — (2001a). The Tornado: Nature's Ultimate Windstorm. Norman: University of Oklahoma Press. ISBN 978-0-8061-3538-0.
  - — (2001b). F5–F6 Tornadoes. St. Johnsbury, Vermont: The Tornado Project of Environmental Films.
