= Vethbach =

River of Lower Saxony, Germany

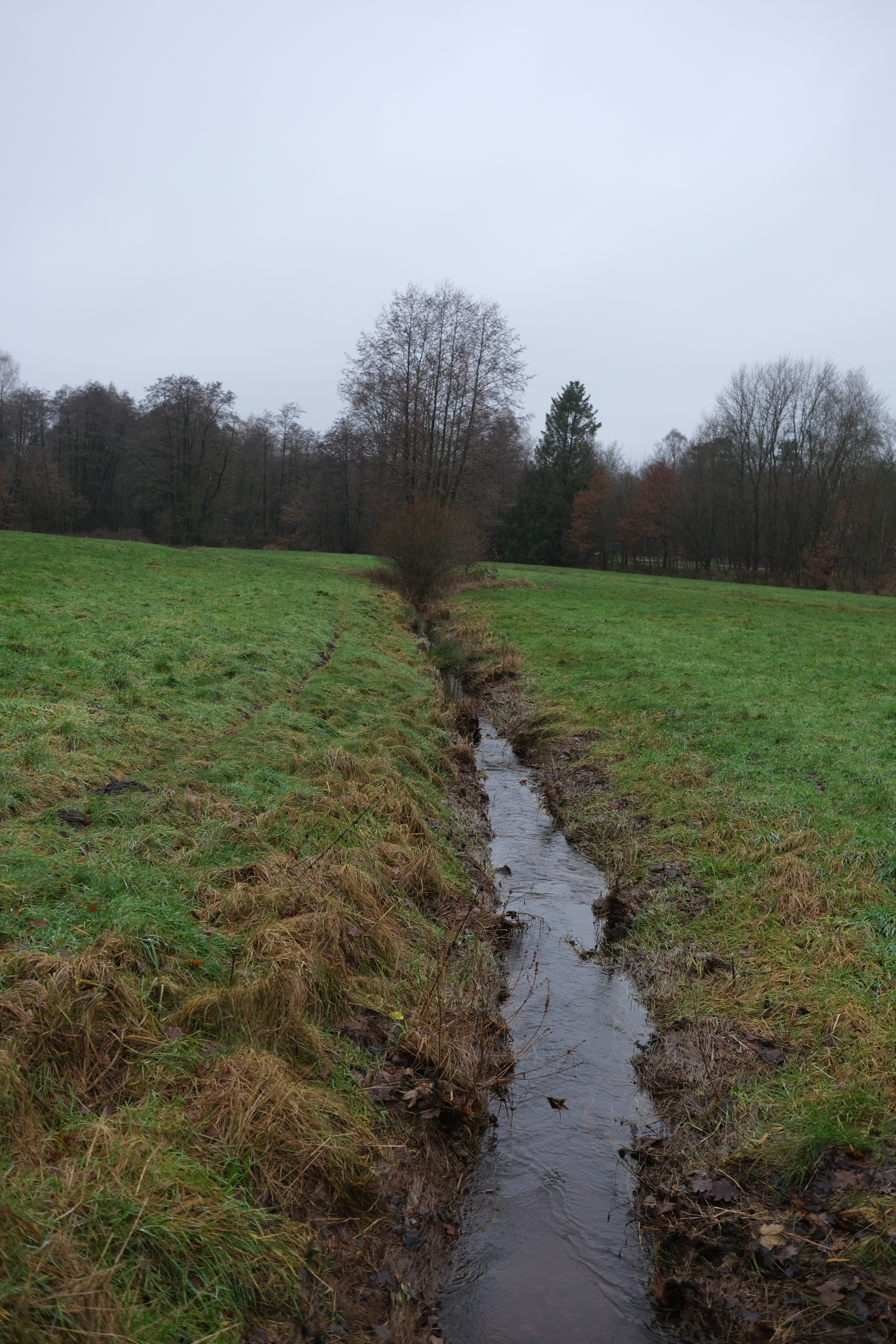

Location
- Country: Germany
- State: Lower Saxony

Physical characteristics
- Mouth
  - location: Lehrde
  - coordinates: 52.8620°N 9.3349°E

Basin features
- Progression: Lehrde→ Aller→ Weser→ North Sea

Vethbach is a small river of Lower Saxony, Germany. It flows into the Lehrde near Wittlohe.

== geography ==
=== Course ===
The Vethbach stream originates near Vethem in the district of Maienbruch and flows westward through the Walsrode districts of Vethem and Südkampen and through Wittlohe, a district of the municipality of Kirchlinteln. Northwest of Wittlohe, it flows into the Lehrde river from the left (south).

== See also ==
- List of rivers of Lower Saxony
