= Linteln Geest =

The Linteln Geest (German: Lintelner Geest or Lint(e)ler Geest), shown on some maps as the Verden Heath, (German: Verdener Heide) is a geest region in the north German state of Lower Saxony and belongs administratively to the borough of Kirchlinteln.

== Geography ==
The Linteln Geest covers the historic Duchy of Verden which nowadays comprises the easternmost fringes of the Achim-Verden Geest, which is part of the Stade Geest, within the district of Verden. Its largest town is Kirchlinteln. The Linteln Geest is bordered by the River Aller to the southwest, the Middle Weser Region to the west, the Wümme Depression to the north and the Lüneburg Heath to the east.

== Appearance ==
The region is agricultural and characterised by morainic hills, small villages and individual farmsteads as well as expansive tracts of forest, heath and bog. In several of the villages on the Linteln Geest there are numerous nurseries.

== Bog body of Brammer ==
In a bog southwest of the village of Kreepen near Brammer a male bog body was discovered on 12 June 1903 in the vicinity of an abandoned village. It was packed in a wooden box and sent to the Museum of Ethnology in Berlin. During the bombing raids on the city during the Second World War the body was lost however. In the Elisabethfehn Moor Museum, a tuft of hair from the bog body is on display.

== European Village Renewal Prize ==
In conjunction with the villages of Bendingbostel, Brunsbrock, Sehlingen, Kreepen, Schafwinkel and Odeweg on the Linteln Geest the region won the European Village Renewal Prize in 2000 awarded by the European Association for Rural Development and Village Renewal.

== Towns and villages ==
- Bendingbostel
- Brunsbrock
  - Klein Linteln
  - Schmomühlen
- Heins
  - Groß Heins
  - Klein Heins
- Holtum (Geest)
  - Heidkrug
  - Wedehof
- Kirchlinteln
- Kreepen
  - Brammer
- Kükenmoor
- Schafwinkel
  - Odeweg
  - St. Pauli
- Sehlingen

== Places of interest ==
- original village centres with buildings in the Lower Saxon style typical of the region
- churches in Kirchlinteln and Brunsbrock
- Lake Brammer
- Lindhoop War Memorial in Kirchlinteln
