= Lehrde =

River in Germany

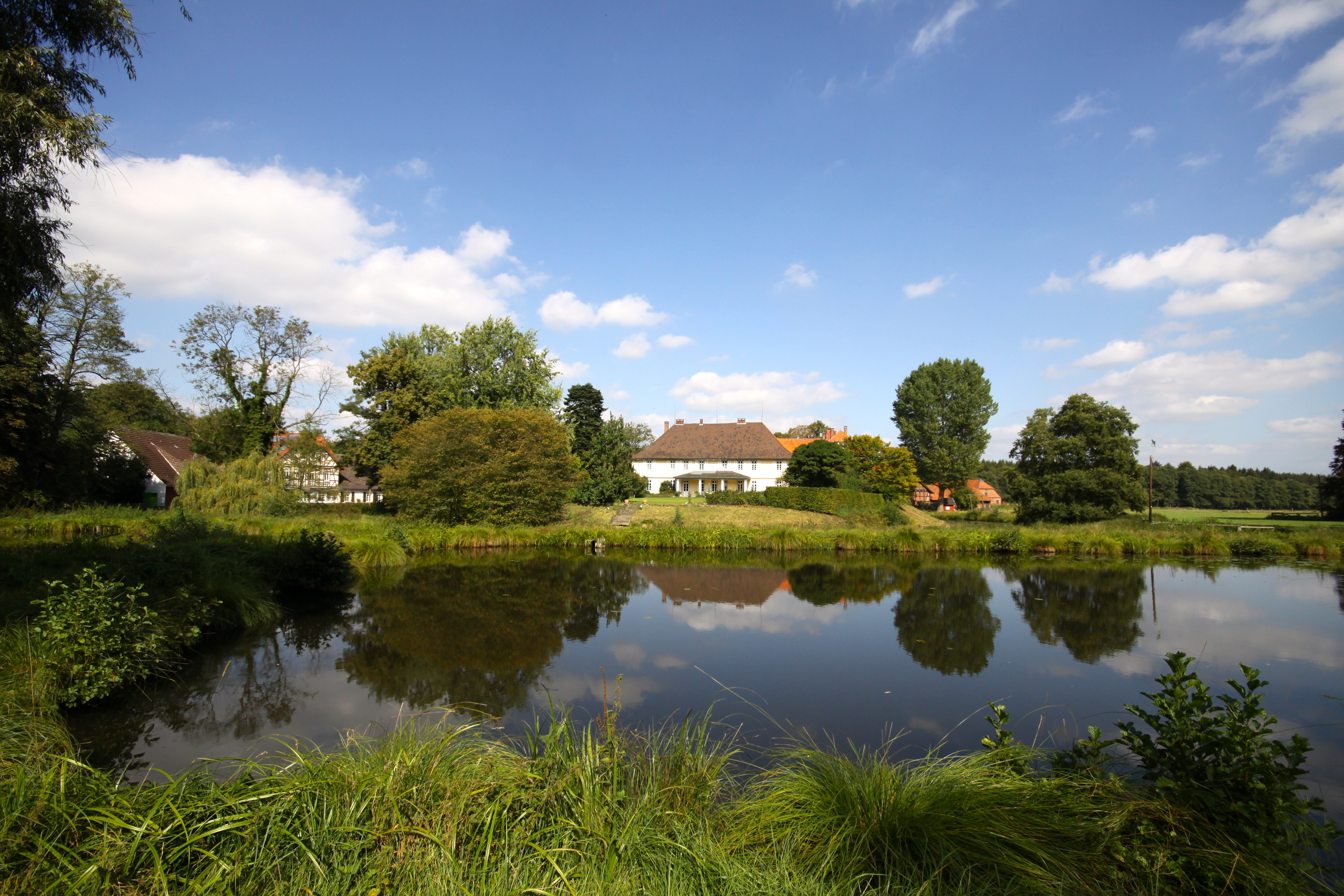
- The dammed Lehrde at Stellichte (Walsrode)

Location
- Country: Germany
- State: Lower Saxony

Physical characteristics
- Source
  - location: east of Kettenburg
  - coordinates: 52°57′16″N 9°35′46″E
  - elevation: 66 m above sea level (NN)
- Mouth
  - location: south of Hohenaverbergen
  - coordinates: 52°51′55″N 9°18′02″E
  - elevation: 14 m above sea level (NN)
- Length: 32.0 km (19.9 mi)
- Basin size: 190 km^{2} (73 sq mi)

Basin features
- Progression: Aller→ Weser→ North Sea
- Landmarks: Villages: Kettenburg, Stellichte, Lehrden, Stemmen, Wittlohe,
- Tributaries
  - left: Fahlbeeke, Idsinger Bach, Hammwieder Graben, Vethbach, Otersener Entwässerungsgraben
  - right: Wehnser Bach, Bleckwedeler Graben

The Lehrde is a 32 km (20 mi) long, right tributary of the river Aller in Lower Saxony, Germany.

== Course ==
It rises east of Kettenburg, a borough of Visselhövede, in the Öttinger Ochsenmoor nature reserve. It then heads westward, crossing the district of Heidekreis, passing the villages of Stellichte (part of Walsrode) and Lehrden. The Lehrde continues across the southern part of the district of Verden. Northeast of Wittlohe (part of Kirchlinteln) it is joined from the left by the Vethbach and discharges south of Hohenaverbergen (part of Kirchlinteln) into the Aller.

== Culture ==
Part of the river Lehrde serves as the setting for the Town Musicians of Bremen fairy tale.

== See also ==
- List of rivers of Lower Saxony
