= Cloppenburg Geest =

Geest in North Germany

- Geest
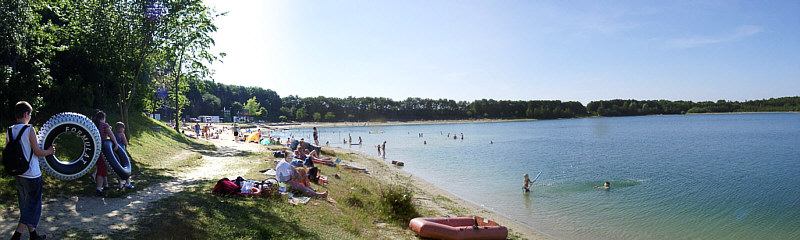

- Location within Lower Saxony Location within Germany
- Coordinates: 52.8333°N 8.16667°E
- Location: Cloppenburg, North Germany
- Part of: Ems-Hunte Geest
- Age: 12,000 years
- Formed by: Elster glaciation
- Geology: Upper Pleistocene

The Cloppenburg Geest (German: Cloppenburger Geest) is a geest region near the town of Cloppenburg in North Germany and the centre of the Saalian glaciation Upper Pleistocene terrain of the Ems-Hunte Geest region. The meltwater sands (Schmelzwassersande) of the advancing ice sheet covered the old terrain with outwash sands (Vorschüttsande). Woldstedt (1955: 159) spoke about underlying sands that, in the "Cloppenburg-Bassum Geest", belonged to the Elster glaciation. A covering of boulder clay was deposited over the outwash sands during the Saale glaciation, or more precisely the Drenthe stage.

A series of meltwater valleys characterises the surface of the Cloppenburg Geest, something that was vital to the emergence of the river network. "Numerous parallel, flat channels cross the terrain and so create a landscape of parallel ridges" writes Woldstedt (1955: 158). There are two opposing theories for the formation of the rivers. Hausfeld (1983; 1984) put their emergence down to large cracks in the Drenthe ice sheet, through which meltwaters flowed as the glacier thawed, cutting through the ground moraines and down into the outwash sands. Woldstedt (1956) spoke of channels (Rinnen) in another connexion. The advancing ice followed the depth contours, conserving and deepening them. When the ice sheet retreated, dead ice (Toteis) remained deep in these channels; it was their thawing that then enabled the rivers to flow down their old valleys.

During the marine regression of the Weichselian glaciation that ended about 12,000 years ago, in which the northwest German plain was not covered by ice, the rivers of the Cloppenburg Geest cut deeply into the valley sands. At that time the windborne and dune sands were formed especially as the area around the perimeter dried out. The climate of the post-glacial period was moister and warmer. The rise in sea level, the base level for river erosion, probably led to a rise in the water table in the geest depression (Roeschmann, 1971: 189). In the valleys vast fen peats formed, whilst on the valley edges and the larger basins raised bogs were formed (Hausfeld, 1983: 245).

== Sources ==
- Heinz-Josef Lücking: Ökologische Bewertung des Soestetals zwischen Cloppenburg und Stedingsmühlen (LK Cloppenburg, Nordwest-Deutschland) aus der Sicht des Naturschutzes unter besonderer Berücksichtigung der Vegetation, Gewässergüte und des ökomorphologischen Gewässerzustandes. BSH/NVN naturspecialREPORT 1995, ISBN 3-923788-29-0 Heft 21. Diplomarbeit im Fach Geographie an der Justus-Liebig-Universität, Gießen, 1992.
