= Urstrom =

River in Poland

The Urstrom is a geologists' name for a great glacial age river of the Polish and north German plain, which drained the combined melt-waters from the northern headwaters of the Alps and the southern part of the Scandinavian ice during the Devensian ice age.

== See also ==
- Urstromtal
