= Elbe Urstromtal =

Valley

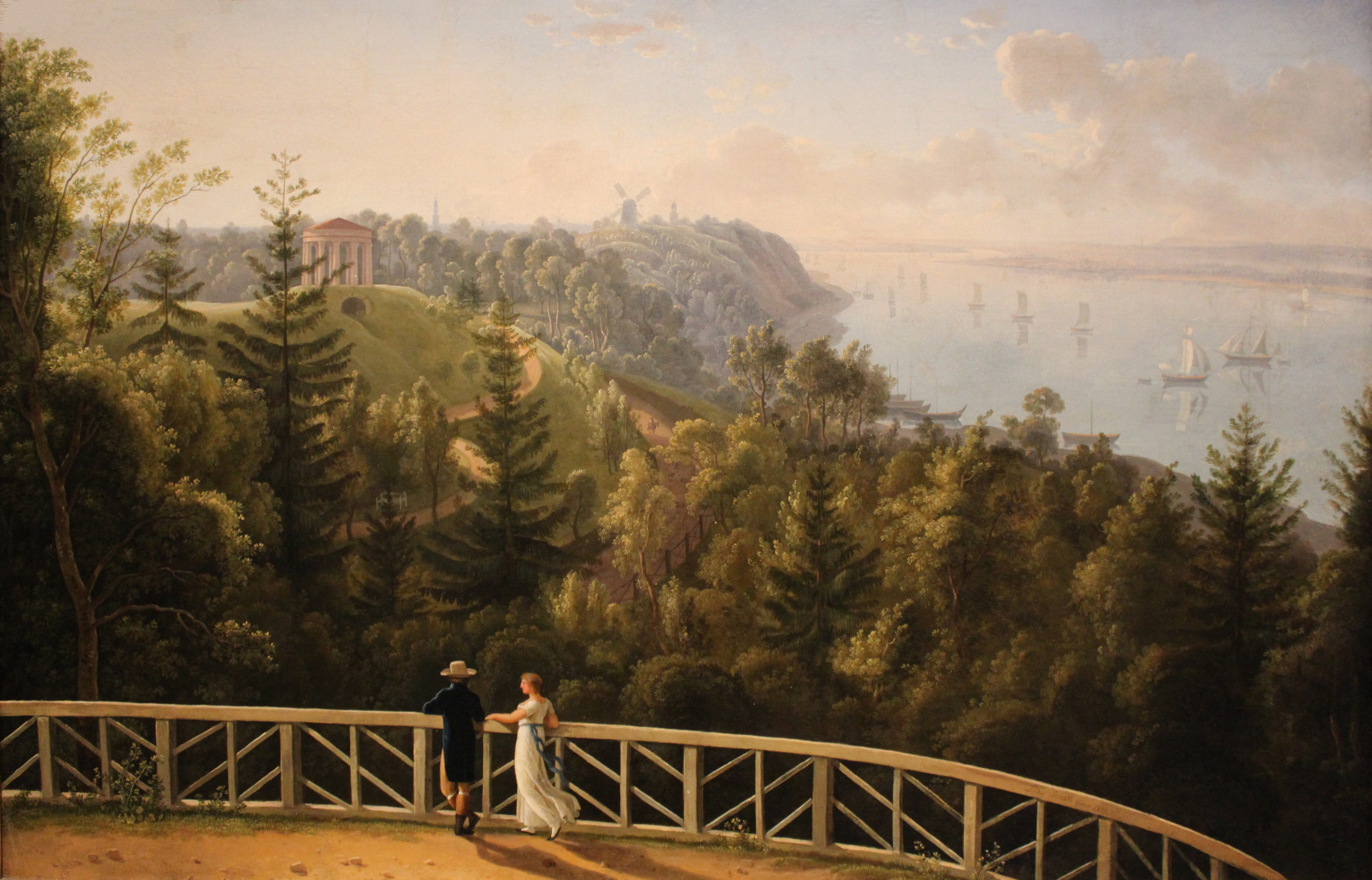
View from Baur's Park to Hamburg. An 1811 painting by L.P. Strack illustrating the steep Geest slope.

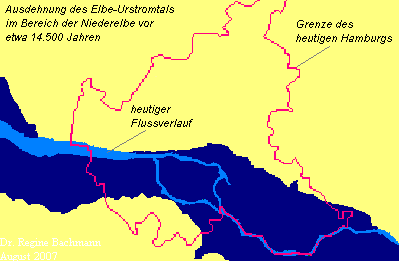
Extent of the urstromtal in and around Hamburg ancient Elbe river bed current Elbe river bed

The Elbe Urstromtal (German: Elbe-Urstromtal) refers to the present-day valley of the Elbe over a length of around 300 kilometers (190 miles) between the German town of Genthin, Saxony-Anhalt, and the Elbe's mouth into the North Sea near Cuxhaven, Lower Saxony. The urstromtal, or glacial meltwater valley, emerged at the height of the Weichselian glaciation.

== History ==
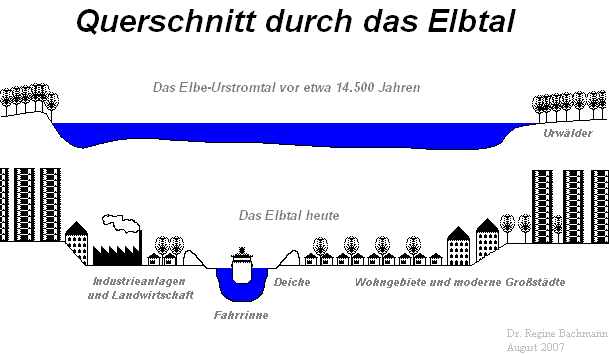
Cross sections through the Elbe Valley

The Elbe Urstromtal probably emerged between the coldest period of the Weichselian glaciation, about 22,000 to 18,000 years ago, and the end of the glaciation in North Germany about 14,500 years ago. At that time the glacier was melting and the waters attempted to find their way to the lowest lying points. The Elbe Urstromtal collected the meltwaters and carried them to the North Sea, which then lay up to 120 meters below its present level. The then coastline was about 600 kilometers (370 miles) further north.

The Elbe Urstromtal also collected the meltwaters of the three urstromtäler, the Glogau-Baruth Urstromtal, Warsaw-Berlin Urstromtal and Thorn-Eberswald Urstromtal and carried them in the direction of the North Sea Basin.

Today, the course of the Elbe Urstromtal roughly follows the course of the present day Elbe river, because – unlike other Urstromtälern – the Elbe Urstromtal has neither dried out nor silted up, but still carries the River Elbe, which has its source in the Bohemian Giant Mountains.

The old course of the meltwater river can be easily made out in the Lower Elbe (Niederelbe) region. For example, there is still a roughly 50-meter-high geest slope from Bergedorf to Geesthacht which was the old river bank. Likewise, there is a roughly 30-meter-high slope at the height of Hamburg's western Elbe suburbs (Elbvororte) Othmarschen, Nienstedten and Blankenese.
