= Geest =

Land formation common in northern Germany, Denmark, and the Netherlands

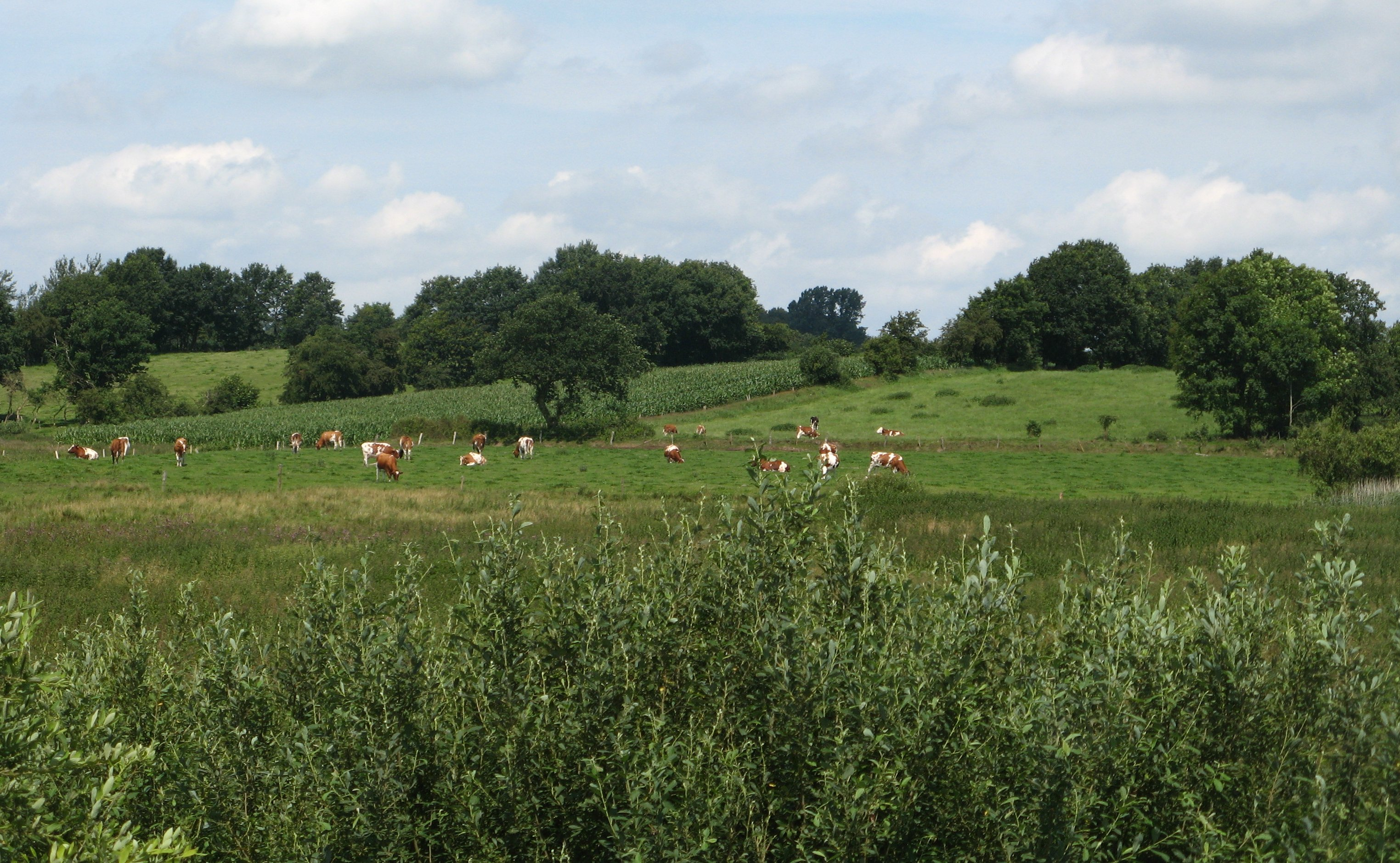
A geest landscape near Dörpling in Schleswig-Holstein, Germany

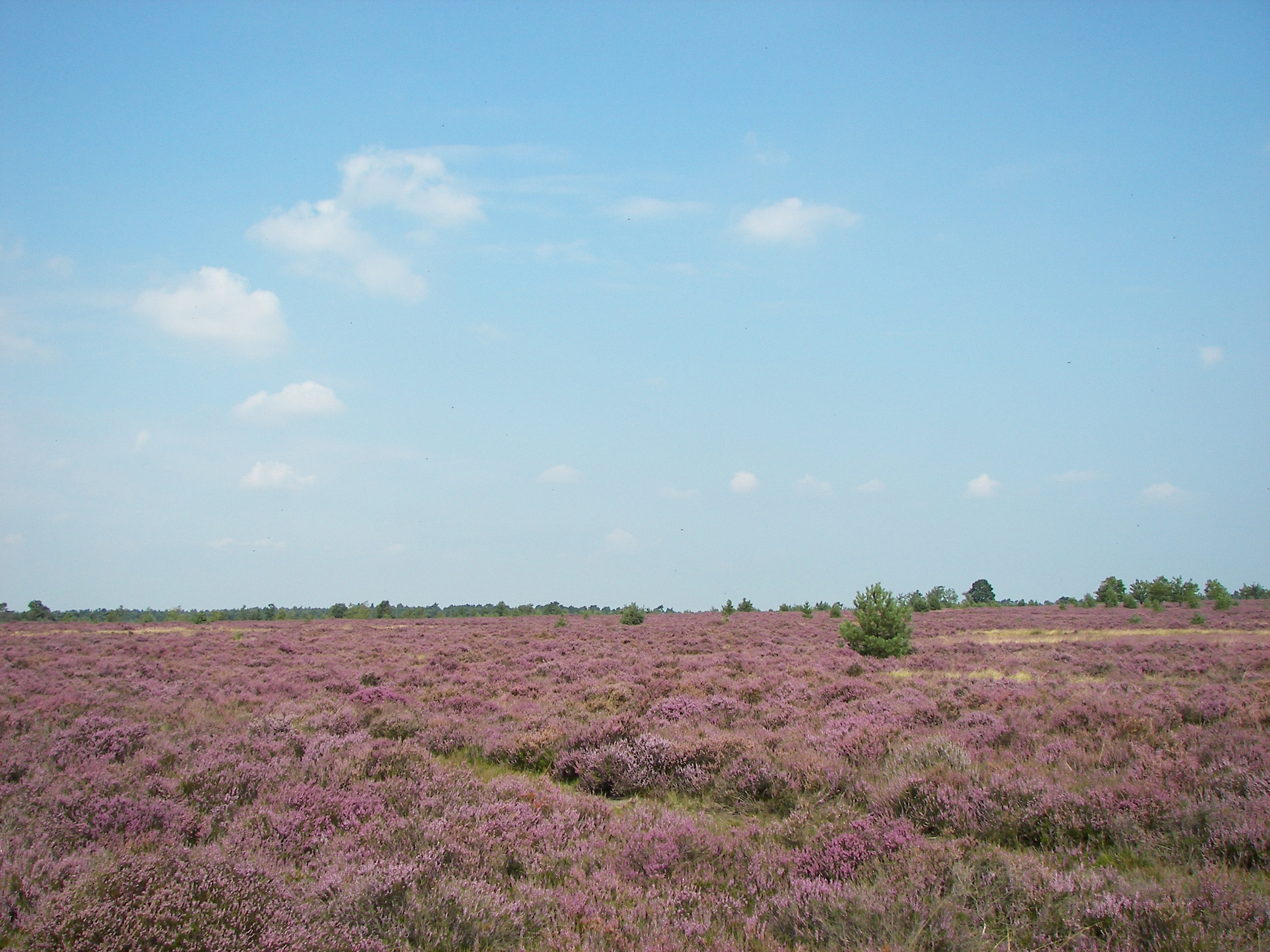
The Osterheide, a heath landscape on geest near Schneverdingen on the Lüneburg Heath, Germany

Geest (German pronunciation: [ɡeːst], Dutch: geestgrond [ˈɣeːstxrɔnt], Danish: gest [ˈke̝ˀst]) is a type of landform, slightly raised above the surrounding countryside, that occurs on the plains of Northern Germany, the Northern Netherlands and Denmark. It is a landscape of sandy and gravelly soils formed as a glacial outwash plain and now usually mantled by a heathland vegetation on the glacial deposits left behind after the last ice age during the Pleistocene epoch.

== Etymology ==
The term geest is a substantivisation of the Low German adjective güst, which means "dry and infertile;" it is cognate with English yawn.

== Description ==
It is an Old Drift landscape, characterised by the sandy depositions of the Ice Age. In the depressions between the raised flats are wet meadows and, where drainage is poor, bogs. Geest lands are made up of moraines and sandurs. They are almost always next to flat marshlands, the geest being higher and better protected against flood but, compared to the marsh, with poor soil for agriculture. Where the geest borders the sea directly, sand cliffs exist.

The oldest settlements in Northern Germany and Denmark lie on geest, since it provided better protection against storm floods. Many important towns are on the boundary between geest and marshland where people could enjoy the flood-protection of the geest but still use the much more fertile soil in the marsh.

== Geography ==
Examples of regions characterised by geest are:

- the Burgdorf-Peine Geest
- the Cloppenburg Geest near Cloppenburg
- the geest hillsides between Wedel, Altona and Hamburg-Neustadt and between Hamburg-St. Georg, Bergedorf, Geesthacht and Lauenburg north of the Elbe (see also: Elbe Urstromtal)
- the central geest areas of the islands of Amrum, Föhr and Sylt
- the Hanoverian Moor Geest
- the Heide-Itzehoe Geest
- the Linteln Geest near Kirchlinteln
- the Lüneburg Heath in Lower Saxony
- the Rehden Geest Moor
- the Schleswig Geest
- the Stade Geest near Stade (including the Zeven Geest and Wesermünde Geest)
- the Wildeshausen Geest in Lower Saxony
- the Wingst northwest of Hemmoor (Lower Saxony)

== See also ==
- Schlatt
