= Urstromtal =

Type of glacial valley in Central Europe

An urstromtal (plural: Urstromtäler) is a type of broad glacial valley, for example, in northern Central Europe, that appeared during the ice ages, or individual glacial periods of an ice age, at the edge of the Scandinavian ice sheet and was formed by meltwaters that flowed more or less parallel to the ice margin. Urstromtäler are an element of the glacial series. The term is German and means "ancient stream valley". Although often translated as "glacial valley", it should not be confused with a valley carved out by a glacier. More accurately some sources call them "meltwater valleys" or "ice-marginal valleys".

== Emergence and structure ==
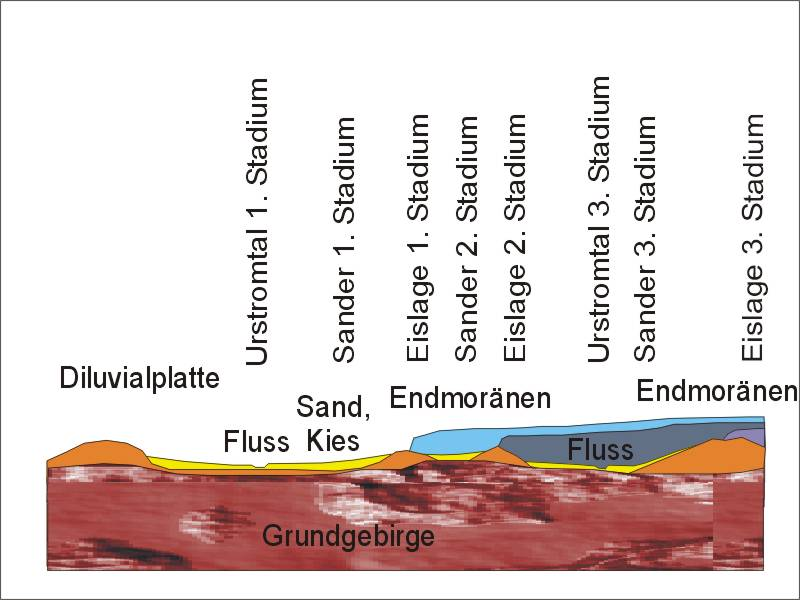
Section through an Urstromtal

Important for the emergence of the Urstromtäler is the fact that the general lie of the land on the North German Plain and in Poland slopes down from south to north. Thus the ice sheet that advanced from Scandinavia flowed into a rising terrain. The meltwaters could therefore only flow for a short distance southwards over the sandurs (outwash plains) before having to find a way to the North Sea basin that was parallel to the ice margin. At that time, the area that is now the North Sea was dry as a result of the low level of the sea.

As elements of the glacial series, Urstromtäler are intermeshed with sandur areas for long stretches along their northern perimeters. It was over these outwash plains that the meltwaters poured into them. Urstromtäler are relatively uniformly composed of sands and gravels; the grain size can vary considerably, however. Fine sand dominates especially in the upper sections of the Urstromtal sediments. The thickness of the Urstromtal sediments also varies a great deal, but is mostly well over ten metres.

Urstromtäler have wide and very flat valley bottoms that are between 1.5 and 20 kilometres wide. The valley sides, by contrast are only a few to a few dozen metres high. The bottom and the edges of an Urstromtal may have been significantly altered by more recent processes, especially the thawing of dead ice blocks or the accumulation of sand dunes. In the post-glacial period, many Urstromtäler became bogs due to their low lying situation and the high water table.

== Central Europe ==
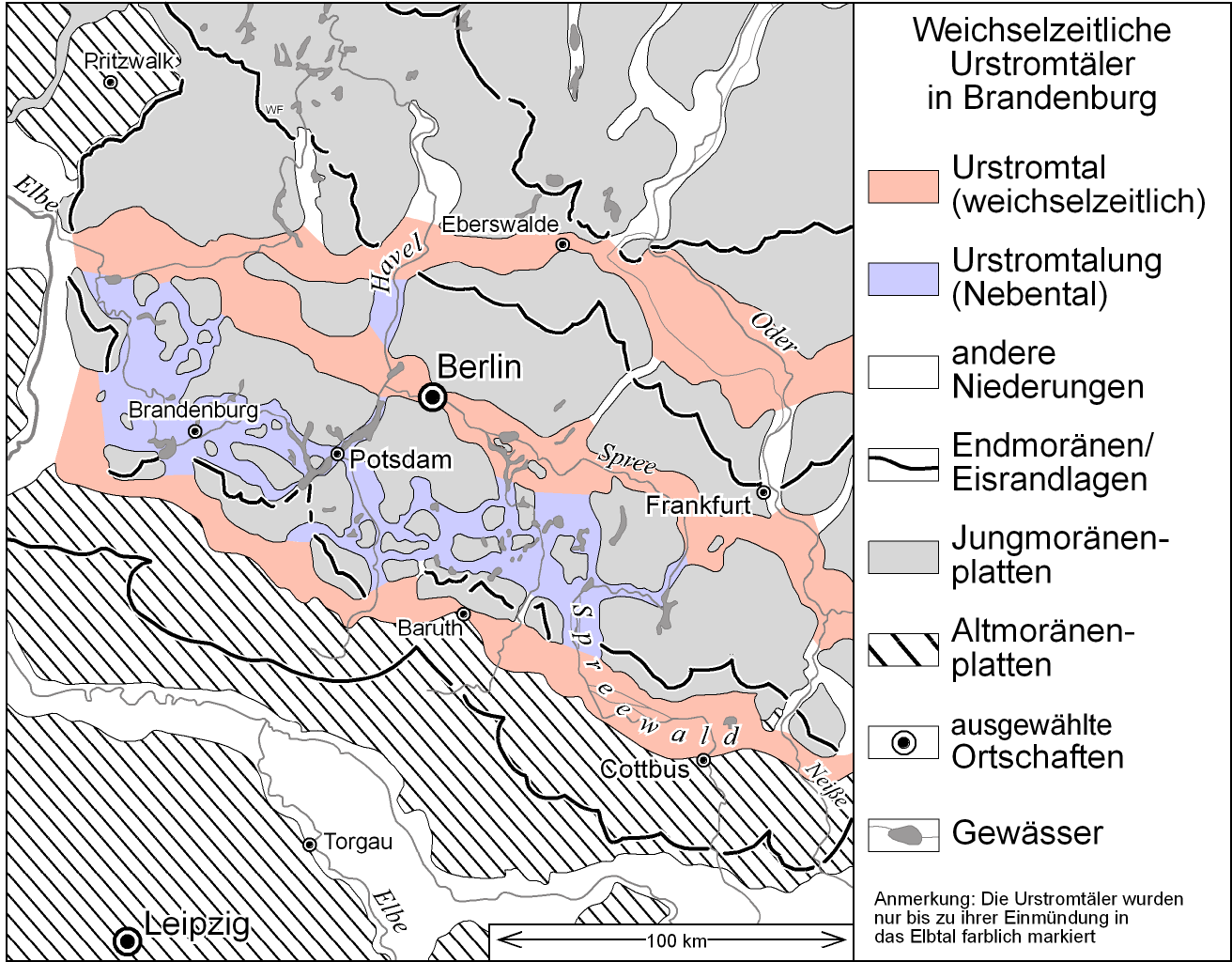
Weichselian Urstromtäler in Brandenburg

In Central Europe, there are several Urstromtäler from various periods.

- Breslau-Magdeburg-Bremen Urstromtal; (Poland, Germany); formed during the Saale glaciation
- Glogau-Baruth Urstromtal; (Poland, Germany); formed during the Weichselian
- Warsaw-Berlin Urstromtal; (Poland, Germany); formed during the Weichselian
- Thorn-Eberswalde Urstromtal; (Poland, Germany); formed during the Weichselian
- The term Elbe Urstromtal refers to the Elbe valley roughly at the height of Genthin to the Elbe estuary at Cuxhaven. The meltwaters of the three above-mentioned Weichselian Urstromtäler flowed successively through this valley towards the North Sea basin.
- The term Rhine Urstromtal for the Rhine valley from Düsseldorf to its mouth on the North Sea is disputed. The Rhine was certainly a route for meltwaters during the Saale glaciation. The structure of the valley is however clearly older and was formed by recent tectonics.
- In the Alpine glaciation zone of Central Europe the term Urstromtal is not used. In this region, the Danube and, periodically, the Rhine carried the meltwaters away.

Some sections of the aforementioned main valleys have been given their own names. The Lusatian Urstromtal and the Aller Urstromtal are parts of the Breslau-Magdeburg-Bremen Urstromtal. The Baruth, Berlin and Eberswalde Urstromtäler are common short names for the associated sections of the Urstromtal in Brandenburg.

In addition to the large main valleys there are also numerous smaller meltwater valleys (Urstromtalungen). Their appearance is similar to that of the great Urstromtäler, but they are considerably shorter. They are also not linked to a sandur and a terminal moraine.

Urstromtäler of Central Europe (Poland, Germany and Denmark especially) were directly connected to the North Atlantic Ocean, via the Channel River, during Pleistocene maximum glaciations, i.e. at times of confluence of the British and Fennoscandian ice-sheets in the intervening North Sea.

== Features ==
Urstromtäler should not be confused with tunnel valleys. The latter are formed beneath, not in front of, the ice mass. In addition most tunnel valleys run from north to south. The principal direction of Urstromtäler is from east to west. Today Urstromtäler are only partly used by rivers, because the majority have found shorter routes to the sea (like the Oder and Vistula). The straight troughs of the Urstromtäler between the rivers were used for canal routes due to their low gradient, for example for the Elbe–Havel Canal or the Oder–Havel Canal.

Because the land in North America and on the Russian Plain tilts towards the south, the formation of Urstromtäler there during the ice age did not take place. The Mississippi River and its tributaries carried the meltwaters of the North American ice sheet away. In Eastern Europe the meltwaters flowed down the river basins of the Dnieper, Don and Volga.

Urstromtäler, whether sandy or boggy, posed considerable obstacles to movement in the Middle Ages. As a result, the trade routes converged on points where the valley could be crossed comparatively easily. These hubs thus became favourite sites for the founding of towns or castles. Examples from the German state of Brandenburg include Berlin, Fürstenwalde, Luckenwalde and Baruth/Mark, and from Lower Saxony the town of Vorsfelde and Wolfsburg Castle.

== See also ==
- Palaeochannel
- Strath
- Urstrom

== Literature ==
- H. Liedtke: Die nordischen Vereisungen in Mitteleuropa. 2nd ed., Trier 1981, ISBN 3-87994-204-8, 307 p.
- H. Liedtke, J. Marcinek (ed.): Physische Geographie Germanys. 3rd ed., Gotha 2002, ISBN 3-623-00860-5, 786 p.
- Johannes H. Schroeder (ed.): Führer zur Geologie von Berlin und Brandenburg, No. 2, Bad Freienwalde – Parsteiner See. 2nd improved edition. Geowissenschaftler in Berlin und Brandenburg e. V., Selbstverlag, Berlin 1994, ISBN 3-928651-03-X, ISSN 0941-2980
- Johannes H. Schroeder (ed.): Führer zur Geologie von Berlin und Brandenburg, No. 5, Nordwestlicher Barnim – Eberswalder Urstromtal. Geowissenschaftler in Berlin und Brandenburg e. V., Selbstverlag, Berlin 2004, ISBN 3-928651-06-4, ISSN 0941-2980
- Johannes H. Schroeder (ed.): Führer zur Geologie von Berlin und Brandenburg, No. 9, Oderbruch – Märkische Schweiz – Östlicher Barnim. Geowissenschaftler in Berlin und Brandenburg e. V., Selbstverlag, Berlin 2003, ISBN 3-928651-11-0, ISSN 0941-2980
