= Schlatt (landform) =

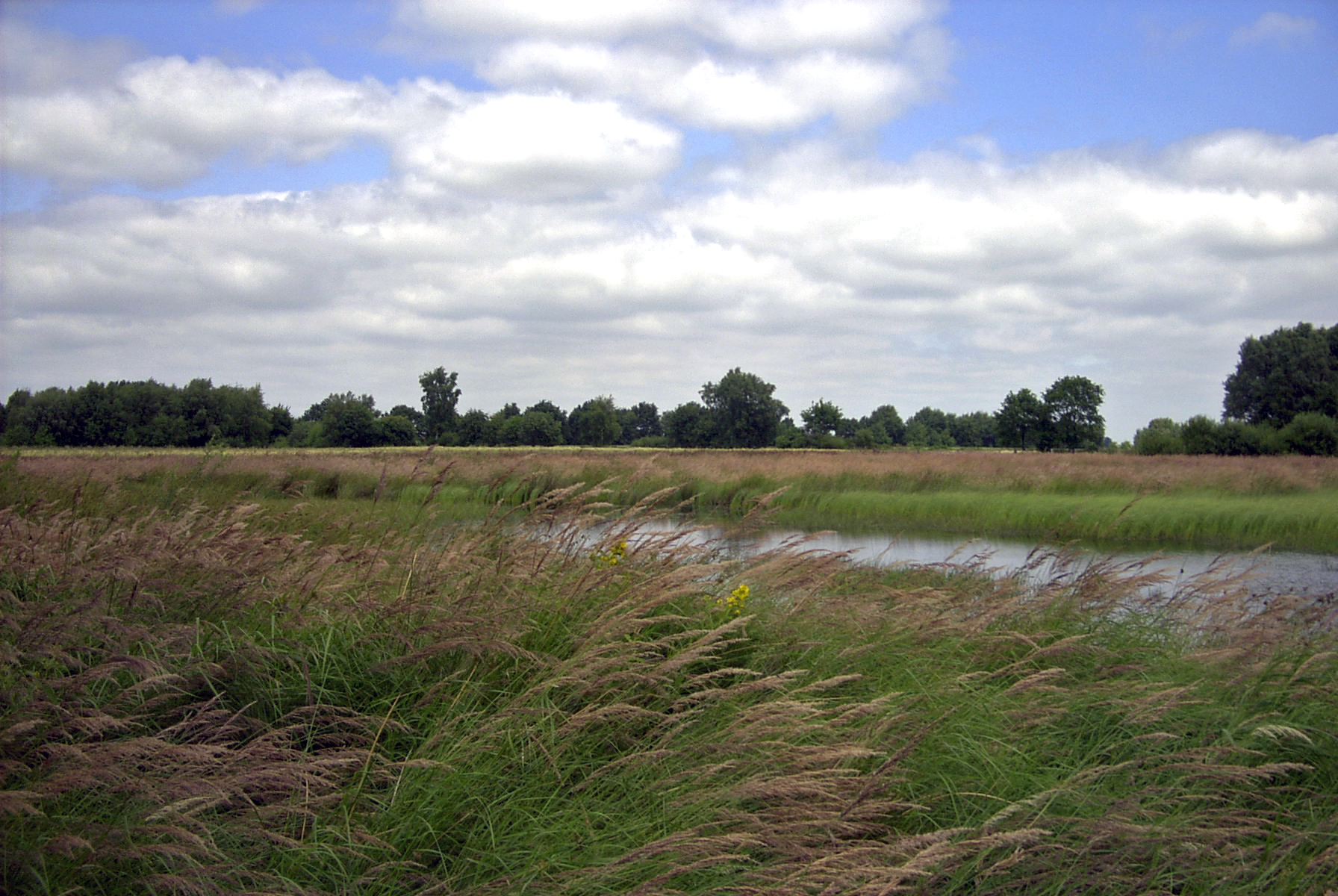
A Schlatt near the town of Syke, Lower Saxony

Schlatt or Flatt is the Lower Saxon name for a heathland pond, an undrained body of water usually shallow, that is fed by surface water and is largely unaffected by ground water. The water is impounded by a water-retentive layer. Most Schlatts can dry out from time to time.

Schlatts are characteristic of the nutrient-poor geest ridges of the North German Plain. Most of them were formed as wind-blown hollows in the periglacial region of the last ice age. The term is of Lower Saxon origin and is used mainly for the ponds in that part of Germany.

In the district of Diepholz (Lower Saxony) the Conservation Foundation (Stiftung Naturschutz) has taken upon itself the preservation of Schlatts as part of a Schlatt programme. Using volunteers working with the land owners and farmers over 300 small ponds and Schlatts have been cleaned up and maintained in order to preserve them as habitats for threatened animal and plant species.

== Sources ==
=== Literature ===
Jan Höper: Flora und Vegetation von Kleingewässern in landwirtschaftlich genutzten Bereichen des Landkreises Diepholz. Diplomarbeit, Göttingen 1999, 129 S.

Georg Müller: "Was ist ein Schlatt", Entstehung-Entwicklung-Zustand und rechtliche Hinweise. Broschüre 16 Seiten, Ganderkesee 2009 www.wallhecke.de
