= De Beintemapoldermolen, Westergeest =

Smock mill in the Netherlands

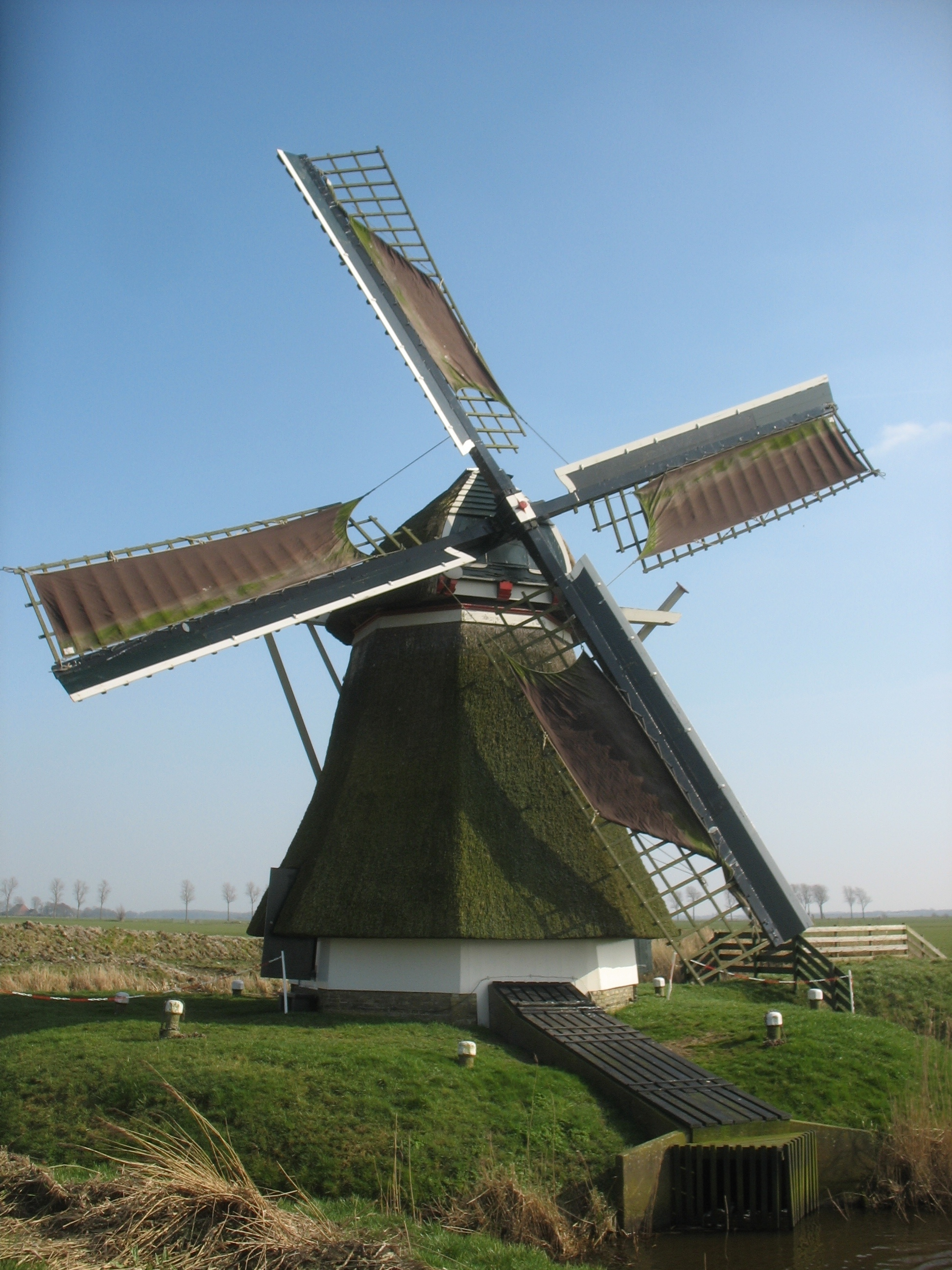
- De Beintemapoldermolen, March 2009.

Origin
- Mill name: De Beintemapoldermolen
- Mill location: Wouddijk, 9295 ZA, Westergest
- Coordinates: 53°10′03″N 5°50′28″E
- Operator(s): Stichting De Fryske Mole
- Year built: 1870

Information
- Purpose: Drainage mill
- Type: Smock mill
- Storeys: One storey smock
- Base storeys: One storey base
- Smock sides: Eight sides
- No. of sails: Four sails
- Type of sails: Common sails
- Windshaft: Cast iron
- Winding: Tailpole and winch
- Type of pump: Archimedes' screw

De Beintemapoldermolen is a smock mill in Westergeest, Friesland, Netherlands which was built in 1870 and has been restored to working order. It is listed as a Rijksmonument.

== History ==
De Beintemapoldermolen was built in 1870 to drain the Beintemapolder. It replaced a mill that had burnt down the previous year. In 1950, an electrically powered pump took over the mills' work. Permission was sought in September 1963 to demolish the mill. This was refused. On 30 March 1965, the mill was sold to the local gemeente. Restoration was carried out in 1968 by millwright De Roos of Leeuwarden, Fresland, On 19 June 1980, the mill was sold to Stichting De Fryske Mole, the 25th mill bought by that organisation. A further restoration was carried out in 1988 by millwright Thijs Jellema of Birdaard, Friesland. It is listed as a Rijksmonument, №23768.

== Description ==
De Beintemapoldermolen is what the Dutch describe as a Grondzeiler. It is a one storey smock mill on a single storey base. There is no stage, the sails reaching almost to ground level. The mill is winded by tailpole and winch. The smock and cap are thatched. The sails are Common sails. They have a span of 14.16 metres (46 ft 5 in). The sails are carried on a cast iron windshaft, which was cast by Gietijzerij Hardinxveld-Giessendam in 1988. The windshaft carries the brake wheel which has 48 cogs. This drives the wallower (25 cogs) at the top of the upright shaft. At the bottom of the upright shaft there are two crown wheels The upper crown wheel, which has 36 cogs drives an Archimedes' screw via a crown wheel. The lower crown wheel, which has 33 cogs is carried on the axle of an Archimedes' screw, which is used to drain the polder. The axle of the screw is 30 centimetres (12 in) diameter and 3.65 metres (12 ft 0 in) long. The screw is 98 centimetres (3 ft 3 in) diameter. It is inclined at 19.3°. Each revolution of the screw lifts 299 litres (66 imp gal) of water.

== Public access ==
De Beintemapoldermolen is usually open on Saturdays, or by appointment.
