= List of Stolpersteine in Adendorf =

Memorial installations in Germany

This article lists the Stolpersteine that were laid as part of the project of the same name by Gunter Demnig in Adendorf. They serve as a memorial to victims of National Socialism who lived and worked in Adendorf.

The project in Adendorf was initiated during the 2011–2012 school year by the "Sinti and Roma" politics course at the Oberschule am Katzenberg. The first stone was laid on 10 October 2012.

On 3 October 2014, the second stone was laid in front of the town hall.

== List of Stolpersteine ==
| Image | Name and inscription | Address | Date laid | Other information |
|---|---|---|---|---|
| Stolperstein for Wolfgang Mirosch | Here learned Wolfgang Mirosch born 1935 deported 1943 'Gypsy camp' Auschwitz died 11 September 1943 starved to death | Dorfstraße 58 53.2876297°N 10.445147°E | 10 October 2012 | |
| Stolperstein for Wilhelm Wiese | At Köhlerweg 2 lived and worked Mayor Wilhelm Wiese born 1891 arrested 1944 'Aktion Gewitter' Neuengamme murdered 17 March 1945 | Rathausplatz 53.2817983°N 10.4396986°E | | |

== See also ==
- List of Stolpersteine in Bad Münder
