= List of Stolpersteine in Bad Münder =

Memorial installations in Germany

This article lists the Stolpersteine that were laid in Bad Münder in September 2015 as part of the art project of the same name by Gunter Demnig. They are intended to commemorate victims of Nazism who lived and worked in Bad Münder.

Address	Person	Inscription	Image	
Vor dem Oberntore 8	Helene Ney	Hier wohnte Helene Ney Geb. Bogey Jg. 1865 deportiert 1942 Theresienstadt 1942 Treblinka ermordet		Helene Boley was born on June 7, 1865 in Gudensberg. She was deported from Hanover on July 23, 1942 to the Theresienstadt ghetto and on September 26, 1942 to the Treblinka extermination camp.
Wallstraße 2	Frieda Hammerschlag	Hier wohnte Frieda Hammerschlag Jg. 1867 deportiert 1942 Theresienstadt ermordet 30.12.1942		Frieda Hammerschlag was born on October 9, 1867 in Bad Münder. She was deported from Hanover on July 23, 1942 to the Theresienstadt ghetto, where she was murdered on December 30, 1942.
Wallstraße 2	Henny Hammerschlag	Hier wohnte Henny Hammerschlag Jg. 1870 deportiert 1942 Theresienstadt ermordet 30.3.1943		Henny Hammerschlag was born in Bad Münder on 27 October 1870 and lived there. On 23 July 1942, she was deported from Hanover to the Theresienstadt ghetto, where she was murdered on 30 December 1943.
Wallstraße 2	Eugen Herze	Hier wohnte Eugen Herze Jg. 1896 'Schutzhaft' 1937 deportiert 1942 Ghetto Warschau ermordet		Eugen Herze was born on May 1, 1896 in Aachen and was a resident at the retraining camp Grüner Weg in Paderborn, the retraining camp Schloßhofstraße in Bielefeld, and in Bad Münder. He was imprisoned in the Sachsenhausen concentration camp from June 22, 1938 to October 9, 1938, and was deported from Hanover on March 31, 1942 to the Warsaw Ghetto.
Wallstraße 2	Hedwig Chana Herze	Hier wohnte Hedwig Chana Herze geb. Herzberg Jg. 1891 deportiert 1942 Ghetto Warschau ermordet		Hedwig Chana Herzberg was born on December 10, 1891 in Fritzlar. She was deported from Hanover on March 31, 1942 to the Warsaw Ghetto.
Wallstraße 2	Hermann Friedheim	Hier wohnte Hermann Friedheim Jg. 1908 Zwangsumzug Judenhaus deportiert 1943 Auschwitz ermordet 5.3.1943		Hermann Friedheim was born on January 14, 1908 in Bad Münder. He was deported on March 2, 1943 to the Auschwitz extermination camp, where he was murdered on July 5, 1943.
Wallstraße 2	Sophie Friedheim	Hier wohnte Sophie Friedheim geb. Culp Jg. 1909 Zwangsumzug Judenhaus deportiert 1943 ermordet in Auschwitz		Sophie Culp was born on November 28, 1909 in Soest. She was deported on March 2, 1943 to the Auschwitz extermination camp. Due to a lack of documentation, she was declared dead.
Wallstraße 2	Ingrid Friedheim	Hier wohnte Ingrid Friedheim Jg. 1936 Zwangsumzug Judenhaus deportiert 1943 ermordet in Auschwitz		Ingrid Friedheim was born on November 14, 1936 in Hameln. She was deported on March 2, 1943 to the Auschwitz extermination camp.
