= Kreepen =

Coordinates: 52°58′N 9°21′E

Kreepen is a small village of about 150 inhabitants in the municipality of Kirchlinteln which belongs to the district of Verden (Aller) in the federal state of Lower Saxony, Germany.
