= Kirchlinteln =

- Municipality
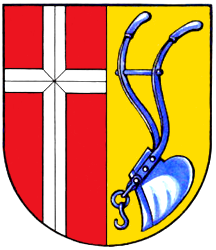
- Coat of arms

- Location of Kirchlinteln within Verden district
- Interactive map of Kirchlinteln
- Location within Germany Location within Lower Saxony
- Coordinates: 52°56′34″N 9°19′6″E
- Country: Germany
- State: Lower Saxony
- District: Verden
- Subdivisions: 16 incorporated villages

Government
  - Mayor (2021–26): Arne Jacobs (CDU)

Area
  - Total: 174.68 km^{2} (67.44 sq mi)
- Elevation: 45 m (148 ft)

Population (2025-12-31)
  - Total: 10,089
  - Density: 57.757/km^{2} (149.59/sq mi)
- Time zone: UTC+01:00 (CET)
  - Summer (DST): UTC+02:00 (CEST)
- Postal codes: 48268
- Dialling codes: 02571
- Vehicle registration: VER
- Website: www.kirchlinteln.de

Kirchlinteln (German pronunciation: [ˈkɪʁçlɪntln̩]) is a municipality in the district of Verden, in Lower Saxony, Germany. Its central village is situated approximately 6 km east of Verden, and 40 km southeast of Bremen. It is surrounded by the Linteln Geest (also called the Verden Heath) which is dominated by woods, hills, heath and small villages. Over the last few decades many people have decided to build their homes in Kirchlinteln or to buy old cottages in this region because of its picturesque landscape and location close to the cities of Bremen and Hanover.

Kirchlinteln belonged to the Prince-Bishopric of Verden, established in 1180. In 1648 the Prince-Bishopric was transformed into the Principality of Verden, which was first ruled in personal union by the Swedish Crown - interrupted by a Danish occupation (1712–1715) - and from 1715 on by the Hanoverian Crown. The Kingdom of Hanover incorporated the Principality in a real union and the Princely territory, including Kirchlinteln, became part of the new Stade Region, established in 1823.

== Structure of municipal subdivisions ==
- Armsen
- Bendingbostel
- Brunsbrock
- Heins, subdivisions:
  - Groß Heins
  - Klein Heins
- Hohenaverbergen
- Holtum (Geest), subdivisions:
  - Heidkrug
  - Wedehof
  - Steinberg
- Kirchlinteln (central village)
- Kreepen and Brammer
- Kükenmoor
- Luttum
- Neddenaverbergen, subdivision:
  - Lehringen
- Otersen, subdivisions:
  - Otersen im Sande
  - Ludwigslust
- Schafwinkel, subdivisions:
  - Sankt Pauli
  - Odeweg
- Sehlingen, subdivisions:
  - Groß Sehlingen
  - Klein Sehlingen
- Stemmen
- Weitzmühlen
- Wittlohe

These villages each have a town provost.

== See also ==
- List of Stolpersteine in Kirchlinteln
