= Zeven Geest =

Coordinates: 53.2909°N 9.3314°E

The Zeven Geest (German: Zevener Geest), which is part of the Stade Geest, is an area of sandy terrain in the northeast of the German state of Lower Saxony. It is named after the town of Zeven.

== Geography ==
The Zeven Geest lies in the Elbe-Weser Triangle between the cities of Hamburg, Bremen and Bremerhaven. It covers the area between Sottrum, Bremervörde, Stade, Buxtehude, Tostedt, Scheeßel and Rotenburg (Wümme). It borders in the west on the Hamme-Oste Lowland and the Teufelsmoor, in the south on the Wümme Lowland and in the northwest on the Wesermünde Geest.

== Administrative affiliation ==
The region of the Zeven Geest belongs administratively to the rural districts (Landkreisen) of Verden, Harburg, Rotenburg (Wümme) and Stade, that were formerly part of the Stade administrative district.

== Towns and villages ==
- Apensen
- Bremervörde
- Buxtehude
- Gnarrenburg
- Gyhum
- Harsefeld
- Heeslingen
- Ottersberg
- Selsingen
- Sittensen
- Sottrum
- Stade
- Tarmstedt
- Tostedt
- Zeven
