= Ernst-Georg Drünkler =

German night fighter ace and Knight's Cross recipient

- Born: 8 July 1920; Bernburg
- Died: 12 March 1997 (aged 76); Sottrum
- Military career
- Allegiance: Nazi Germany
- Branch: Luftwaffe
- Rank: Hauptmann (captain)
- Units: ZG 2, NJG 1, NJG 5
- Commands: 1./NJG 5
- Conflicts: World War II: Defence of the Reich
- Awards: Knight's Cross of the Iron Cross
- Other work: Teacher

Ernst-Georg Drünkler (8 July 1920 – 12 March 1997) was a German Luftwaffe military aviator during World War II, a night fighter ace credited with 47 aerial victories, including two by day, claimed in 102 combat missions making him the thirtieth most successful night fighter pilot in the history of aerial warfare. The majority of his victories were claimed over the Western Front in Defense of the Reich missions against Royal Air Force Bomber Command.

Born in Bernburg, Drünkler grew up in the Weimar Republic and Nazi Germany. Following flight training in 1942, he was posted to Zerstörergeschwader 2 (ZG 2—2nd Destroyer Wing) on the Eastern Front, flying a Messerschmitt Bf 110 heavy fighter. In October 1942, Drünkler transferred to Nachtjagdgeschwader 1 (NJG 1—1st Night Fighter Wing), and later to Nachtjagdgeschwader 5 (NJG 5—5th Night Fighter Wing), where he was trained as a night fighter pilot. Flying with NJG 1, he claimed his first night victory on 13 June 1943. Following his 40th aerial victory, he was awarded the Knight's Cross of the Iron Cross on 20 March 1945 as Staffelkapitän (squadron leader) of the 1. Staffel (1st squadron) of NJG 5. Following the war, he became a teacher for marine navigation and died aged 76 in Sottrum.

== Early life and career ==
Drünkler was born on 8 July 1920 in Bernburg, at the time in the Weimar Republic. He joined the military service of the Luftwaffe and following flight training, (Note: Flight training in the Luftwaffe progressed through the levels A1, A2 and B1, B2, referred to as A/B flight training. A training included theoretical and practical training in aerobatics, navigation, long-distance flights and dead-stick landings. The B courses included high-altitude flights, instrument flights, night landings and training to handle the aircraft in difficult situations. For pilots destined to fly multi-engine aircraft, the training was completed with the Luftwaffe Advanced Pilot's Certificate (Erweiterter Luftwaffen-Flugzeugführerschein), also known as the C-Certificate.) he was posted to the II. Gruppe (2nd group) of Zerstörergeschwader 2 (ZG 2—2nd Destroyer Wing) on 16 May 1942. The Gruppe had just been formed at Landsberg-Lech and Wien-Aspern Airfield and was then deployed on the Eastern Front of World War II.

== World War II ==
World War II in Europe had begun on Friday 1 September 1939 when German forces invaded Poland. Following its deployment to the Eastern Front, II. Gruppe of ZG 2 fought in the area of Poltava, Kharkov, Kursk and Izium. During these battles, Drünkler flew nine ground attack sorties and was credited with the destruction of an armored train, five locomotives, two freight cars and five trucks. His most frequent employment was in courier flights. In late-July, II. Gruppe was withdrawn from combat operations and the remaining aircraft were transferred to Zerstörergeschwader 1 (ZG 1—1st Destroyer Wing). The Gruppe then relocated to Wiener Neustadt Airfield in Wiener Neustadt where the Gruppe was converted to the I. Gruppe of Nachtjagdgeschwader 5 (NJG 5—5th Night Fighter Wing) and placed under the command of Hauptmann Siegfried Wandam. On 1 October, Drünkler assigned to the 2. Staffel (2nd squadron) of NJG 5 where he completed his training as a night fighter pilot.

=== Night fighter career ===
A map of part of the Kammhuber Line. The 'belt' and night fighter 'boxes' are shown.

Following the 1939 aerial Battle of the Heligoland Bight, Royal Air Force (RAF) attacks shifted to the cover of darkness, initiating the Defence of the Reich campaign. By mid-1940, Generalmajor (Brigadier General) Josef Kammhuber had established a night air defense system dubbed the Kammhuber Line. It consisted of a series of control sectors equipped with radars and searchlights and an associated night fighter. Each sector, named a Himmelbett (canopy bed) would direct the night fighter into visual range of the bombers. In 1941, the Luftwaffe started equipping night fighters with airborne radar such as the Lichtenstein radar. This airborne radar did not come into general use until early 1942.

On 24 May 1943, Drünkler was transferred to IV. Gruppe of Nachtjagdgeschwader 1 (NJG 1—1st Night Fighter Wing) based at Leeuwarden Airfield and under the command of Major Helmut Lent. On 12/13 June, RAF Bomber Command committed 503 aircraft—323 Lancasters and 167 Halifaxes with support from 11 de Havilland Mosquitos to Bochum, as it continued the British Battle of the Ruhr operation; 14 Lancaster and 10 Halifax bombers were lost, 4.8 per cent of the attacking force. Drünkler claimed his first two aerial victories; in the early hours of 13 June 1943, north of Schagen, he claimed a Lancaster bomber shot down at 02:20 and a further Lancaster at 02:51 approximately 45 km (28 mi) west of Alkmaar. German pilots claimed 19 Lancasters and 9 Halifax bombers shot down. During this mission, his Messerschmitt Bf 110 G-4 (Werknummer 5427—factory number) sustained combat damage, resulting in a forced landing at Bergervaart, near Bergen op Zoom, which destroyed the aircraft.

On the night of the 21/22 June, 705 RAF bombers—262 Lancasters, 209 Halifaxes, 117 Stirlings, 105 Wellingtons— and 12 Mosquitos attacked Krefeld; 17 Halifaxes, 9 Lancasters, 9 Wellingtons and 9 Stirlings were lost on the operation. This represented 6.2 per cent of the force. The raid was carried out before the full moon period was over and the severe casualties were mostly caused by night fighters. Twelve of the aircraft lost were from the Pathfinders; 35 Squadron lost 6 of 19 Halifaxes. The raid took place in good visibility and the Pathfinders produced an almost perfect marking effort, ground-markers dropped by Oboe-equipped Mosquitos were supplemented by the Pathfinder heavies. 619 aircraft bombed struck the area within 4.8 km (3 mi) of the centre of the target. Drünkler intercepted the bomber stream west of Makkum and claimed a Stirling at 02:39.

On the 23/24 July, Air Marshall Arthur Harris, Air Officer Commanding, Bomber Command, initiated Operation Gomorrah to destroy Hamburg and step up the area bombing of German industrial cities. The RAF mustered 791 aircraft—347 Lancasters, 246 Halifaxes, 125 Stirlings and 73 Wellingtons— for the operation. The British lost 12 aircraft—four Halifaxes, four Lancasters, three Stirlings and a Wellington which amounted to 1.5 per cent of the force. The raid was very successful, window helped confuse German radar defences and H2S radar was used to map and bomb the target. Over the Bay of Kiel in the early hours of 24 July, Drünkler claimed a Halifax shot down at 00:54. (Note: According to Bowman the aircraft shot down by Drünkler was the Lancaster JA866 from 103 Squadron.) It was one of only 12 claims made by the German night fighter pilots that night because of the effectiveness of "window". Six Halifaxes, a Wellington, two Stirlings and three Lancasters were claimed.

In support of Bomber Command the United States Army Air Force (USAAF) Eighth Air Force also attacked Hamburg, bombing the shipyards. The USAAF referred to the attacks as Blitz Week. Three hundred B-17 Flying Fortress bombers from the 1st Bombardment Wing were to attack Hamburg, while a small force was to bomb the U-boat yards at Kiel. The 4th Bombardment Wing was to attack the Focke-Wulf plant at Warnemünde, near Rostock. Drünkler's night fighter unit was used for a day mission. At 18:22, the same day, 25 July, northwest of Vlieland, he claimed a B-17 shot down. The 1st Bomb Wing lost 15 B-17s in the operation and the 4th lost four. It is believed most fell after being damaged by Flak. Jagdgeschwader 1 (JG 1—1st Fighter Wing) and Jagdgeschwader 26 (JG 26—26th Fighter Wing) intercepted but were not successful. JG 26 claimed three for the loss of two fighters and JG 1 claimed three for the loss of four pilots wounded in action. This mission highlighted the need for more armament on the Bf 109 and Focke-Wulf Fw 190. A notable loss was Karl-Heinz Leesmann, who was killed in action and a night fighter crew that came down in the North Sea and were captured by a Royal Navy vessel. Drünkler's claim qualified him as an ace with four night and one day victory.

On 15 August, Drünkler served as an instructor with 13./NJG 5, he became Staffelkapitän (squadron leader) of 1./NJG 5 on 16 February 1944. Drünkler arrived back as the RAF Berlin offensive was coming to an end. He achieved his 6th victory on 24 March 1944 near Langen at 22:23. Another heavy bomber, type unknown, was claimed at 23:10. Thirty minutes later he shot down another near Langensalza. On the night of the 30/31 March 1944, Bomber Command suffered its heaviest loss of the war in an operation to bomb Nürnberg. Bomber Command dispatched 795 aircraft, including 572 Lancasters, 214 Halifaxes and nine Mosquitos. A further 49 Halifax aircraft were sent on minelaying operations in the Heligoland area, 13 Mosquito night fighters were sent to German night-fighter airfields, 34 Mosquitos flew on diversions to Aachen, Cologne and Kassel; 95 bombers were lost, 64 Lancasters and 31 Halifaxes which amounted to 11.9 per cent of the force. Drünkler claimed a Halifax northeast of Frankfurt-am-Main at 00:55. His 10th victory over another Halifax was recorded at 01:06 east of Oberndorf.

=== Normandy ===
1./NJG 5 was transferred to France in the spring of 1944. Bomber Command attacked the rail networks in Belgium and France as a prelude to Operation Overlord, scheduled to begin on 6 June 1944. On one such operation, Bomber Command sent 219 aircraft (125 Lancaster and 86 Halifax bombers supported by 8 Mosquitos) to attack the railway yards at Trappes to the west of Paris in two waves. Four Lancasters lost on the operation. Another 82 Lancasters and four Mosquitos of 5 Group attacked and destroyed a railway junction at Saumur without loss. Drünkler attacked and shot down a Lancaster at 02:05 southwest of Rambouillet. On 2/3 June 1944 Bomber Command sent 128 aircraft—105 Halifaxes, 19 Lancasters and four Mosquitos—of 1, 4 and 8 Groups attacked the railway yards at Trappes again. Fifteen Halifaxes and one Lancaster were lost, 12.5 per cent of the force. Drünkler claimed a heavy bomber (type unknown) over Trappes at 01:00 for his 13th victory. Bomber Command lost 17 aircraft in total this night on operations. German night fighter units claimed 19 aircraft.

Drünkler had another successful night on the 12/13 June 1944, six days after D-Day, when he accounted for two heavy bombers. One fell north of Arques at 00:43 and the other northwest of Dunkirk at 00:56. Drünkler's victims were from 671 aircraft (348 Halifaxes and 285 Lancasters, 38 Mosquitos) of 4, 5, 6 and 8 Groups, sent to attack communications at Amiens, Longueau, Arras, Caen, Cambrai and Poitiers; 23 bombers including 17 Halifaxes and 6 Lancasters from 4 and 6 Groups were lost. On 24/25 June 1944 535 Lancasters, 165 Halifaxes and 39 Mosquito intruders from all RAF groups attacked seven V-1 flying bomb sites and 23 bombers were lost—all Lancasters. Drünkler erroneously claimed a Stirling near Berck-sur-Mer at 03:45. German pilots claimed 38 bombers that night. A 17th claim made at 28/29 June over Château-Thierry at 01:08 was his last of the month. At 02:18 on 13 July Dunkler scored his 18th victory at "Chaumont"; which Chaumont this refers to was not reported. Drünkler continued his success in France on the 14/15 July when he destroyed two Lancasters west of Chaumont (02:08) and southeast of Bar-sur-Seine (02:17) to reach a total of 20. The victim may have been Lancaster III ND994, UL-F2, of 576 Squadron. Flying Officer Raymond Linklater (service number J/25837) and his crew were killed.

Drünkler and his crew scored another double on 18/19 July at 01:37 and 01:45 northwest of Sommevoire and northwest of Condé-en-Barrois, respectively. Drünkler accounted for his last successes on 28/29 July and 4/5 August. On the former night a Lancaster was shot down northwest of Mirecourt at 01:09 and an unknown location at 01:04 on the latter night. On 8/9 August the grid position "PQ GJ" (PQ = Planquadrat) he claimed a Lancaster at 03:10, before sunrise for his 25th victory. It was his last claim in Normandy.

=== Defence of the Reich ===
On the last night of the Normandy campaign, as the German front collapsed, Drünkler and 1./NJG 5 moved to East Prussia. Bomber Command sent 402 Lancasters and one Mosquito of 1, 3, 6 and 8 Groups to Stettin on 29/30 August 1944; 23 Lancasters were lost, 5.7 per cent of the force. This was a successful raid. A further 189 Lancasters of 5 Group carried a successful attack on Königsberg at extreme range. Only 480 long tons (490 t) of bombs could be carried because of the range of the target but severe damage was caused. Wing Commander J. Woodroffe led the attack. Bomber Command estimated that 41 per cent of all the housing and 20 per cent of all the industry in Königsberg was destroyed. There was much night fighter opposition over the target and 15 Lancasters, (7.9 per cent of the force) were lost. Northwest of the city he accounted for his 26th victory. Drünkler then engaged a Lancaster northwest of Pillau at 01:56 and claimed the bomber destroyed.

While based in East Prussia, Drünkler accounted for a Red Air Force Ilyushin DB-3 shot down southeast of Georgenburg at 01:56 for his 28th victory. He followed this up with a Lisunov Li-2 on 16/17 October 1944 at 17:57, the location was not recorded in his report. Another of this type at 18:12 on 23 October brought his score to 30. On 1 January 1945, Drünkler was awarded the German Cross in Gold (Deutsches Kreuz in Gold).

On 8/9 February 1945 the Stettin area was attacked again by Bomber Command. Many raids were carried out on Germany this night and Bomber Command lost 17 aircraft; 10 Lancasters of 5 Group began minelaying off Swinemünde, near Stettin. Rail yards at Krefeld were attacked by 151 bombers and the synthetic oil plant at Pölitz was bombed by 475 heavy bombers. Drünkler intercepted three bombers and claimed them shot down within nine minutes: 21:03 to 21:12 southwest and west of the city. Bomber Command lost Lancaster HK620 from 15 Squadron, LL911 61 Squadron,. ME299 44 Squadron (flown by Flying Officer K. Mangos RNZAF killed with four crewman and two captured), ME314 619 Squadron, ME443, 61 Squadron, ND554 630 Squadron, ND912 7 Squadron, PB737 61 Squadron, and PB759 also from 61 Squadron. German night fighter pilots claimed eight bombers this night, three by Drünkler, three by Walter Borchers of Stab./NJG 5 and one by Hauptmann Herbert Koch of I. Gruppe of Nachtjagdgeschwader 3 (NJG 3—3rd Night Fighter Wing), for this 18th victory northeast of Copenhagen.

On the night of the 14 February 1945, Bomber Command commenced Operation Thunderclap. The target was Chemnitz, 499 Lancasters and 218 Halifaxes 1, 3, 4, 6 and 8 Groups bombed the town ineffectively owing to heavy cloud cover. Post-raid reconnaissance suggest the raid was ineffective and although parts of the city were hit, most of the bombs fell in open country. Bomber Command lost eight Lancaster and five Halifax bombers this night. Drünkler intercepted a Lancaster northeast of Chemnitz at shot it down at 21:05 for victory number 34. Chemnitz and Böhlen were the targets on 5/6 March 1945 were struck by 498 and 248 bombers. Drünkler claimed a heavy bomber southeast of Zwickau at 22:05. Two nights later on 7/8 March he claimed a Lancaster northeast of Erfurt for his 36th claim. Drünkler downed a trio of heavy bombers on 16/17 March 1945, over, east and south of Ansbach from 21:15 to 21:43. This night was also notable for the successes of Johannes Hager who claimed five RAF bombers and Herbert Lütje, who claimed his 50th victory that night.

On 20 March 1945, Drünkler was awarded the Knight's Cross of the Iron Cross (Ritterkreuz des Eisernen Kreuzes) for 39 victories. That night, southwest of Leipzig, in the early hours of 21 March he claimed his 40th victory at 03:28. On 21 March 1945 at 03:38, southwest of Leipzig, Drünkler claimed a Lancaster for his 40th victory. Lancaster I PB845 of No. 463 Squadron RAF on the mission to the synthetic oil refinery at Böhlen, crashed at Tachenau, just south of the target area, killing all seven crew members including pilot Flying Officer Richard Stuart Bennett RAAF (on secondment). It is believed PB845 was destroyed by Drünkler.

By April 1945 the Red Army had reached the Oder and was nearing Berlin, while on the Western Front, the Western Alliance, which had begun in the third week of March, was advancing deep into Germany. 1./NJG 5 remained on operations. On 8 April at 22:56, east of Kolleda, Drünkler defeated his 41st opponent. On 10/11 April he claimed three bombers between 22:55 and 23:05 northwest and east of Leipzig. On 17 April northwest of Strasburg and north of Fürstenwalde at 23:21 and 23:47 he accounted for two Ilyushin Il-4s, Drünkler's penultimate victory claims of the war. On 15 April 1945, Drünkler transferred to 7. Staffel of NJG 3, flying his last combat missions. He was credited with 46 aerial victories—45 nocturnal, including five over Russian bombers, and one daytime victory over Boeing B-17 Flying Fortress—plus further seven unconfirmed claims. He flew 102 combat missions, 83 of which as a night fighter, four night ground attack missions, and 15 daytime sorties.

== Later life ==
Following the war, Drünkler studied mathematics, physics, chemistry, and pedagogy at the Technical University of Hannover. He later became a professor for marine navigation at the City University of Applied Sciences in Bremen. He also served as chairman of the Luftsportverein Bremen e.V., and aeronautical club in Bremen. He died on 12 March 1997 at the age of 76 in Sottrum, in the district of Rotenburg, in Lower Saxony, Germany.

== Summary of career ==
=== Aerial victory claims ===
According to Spick, Drünkler was credited with 45 aerial victories which included five claims on the Eastern Front and two daytime claims. Aders lists him with 47 aerial victory claims. Foreman, Parry and Mathews, authors of Luftwaffe Night Fighter Claims 1939 – 1945, researched the German Federal Archives and found records for 46 nocturnal victory claims. Mathews and Foreman also published Luftwaffe Aces — Biographies and Victory Claims, listing Drünkler with 45 claims, plus two further unconfirmed claims. Two claims dated 15 March 1945 are not recorded in Luftwaffe Night Fighter Claims 1939 – 1945 while one claim dated on 2 November 1944 is missing in Luftwaffe Aces — Biographies and Victory Claims.

Victory claims were logged to a map-reference (PQ = Planquadrat), for example "PQ BK-1". The Luftwaffe grid map (Jägermeldenetz) covered all of Europe, western Russia and North Africa and was composed of rectangles measuring 15 minutes of latitude by 30 minutes of longitude, an area of about 360 square miles (930 km^{2}). These sectors were then subdivided into 36 smaller units to give a location area 3 km × 4 km (1.9 mi × 2.5 mi) in size.

Chronicle of aerial victories
This and the – (dash) indicates unwitnessed aerial victory claims for which Drünkler did not receive credit. This and the ! (exclamation mark) indicates aerial victories listed in Luftwaffe Night Fighter Claims 1939 – 1945 but not in Luftwaffe Aces — Biographies and Victory Claims. This and the % (percent sign) indicates aerial victories listed in Luftwaffe Aces — Biographies and Victory Claims but not in Luftwaffe Night Fighter Claims 1939 – 1945.
Claim	Date	Time	Type	Location	Serial No./Squadron No.
– 12. Staffel of Nachtjagdgeschwader 1 –
1	13 June 1943	02:20	Lancaster	north of Schagen	
2	13 June 1943	02:51	Lancaster	45 km (28 mi) west of Alkmaar	
3	22 June 1943	02:39	Stirling	1.5 km (0.93 mi) west of Makkum	Stirling BK799/No. 149 Squadron RAF
4	25 July 1943	00:54	Halifax	Bay of Kiel	Halifax DK187/No. 76 Squadron RAF
— (Note: According to Luftwaffe Night Fighter Claims 1939 – 1945, this claim is listed as confirmed while Luftwaffe Aces — Biographies and Victory Claims consider this claim unconfirmed.)	25 July 1943	18:12	B-17	25 km (16 mi) northwest of Vlieland	
– 1. Staffel of Nachtjagdgeschwader 5 –
5!	24 March 1944	22:23	four-engined bomber	vicinity of Langen	
6	24 March 1944	23:10	four-engined bomber	vicinity of Langen	
—	24 March 1944	23:40	four-engined bomber	vicinity of Langensalza; 10 km (6.2 mi) southwest of Langensalza	
7	31 March 1944	00:55	Halifax	northeast of Frankfurt am Main	
8	31 March 1944	01:06	Halifax	2 km (1.2 mi) east of Oberndorf	
9	31 March 1944	01:30	Halifax	west of Erlangen	
10	1 June 1944	02:05	Lancaster	5 km (3.1 mi) south-southwest of Rambouillet	
11	3 June 1944	01:04	four-engined bomber	Trappes	
12	13 June 1944	00:43	four-engined bomber	3 km (1.9 mi) north of Arques	
13	13 June 1944	00:56	four-engined bomber	northwest of Dunkirk	
14	25 June 1944	03:45	Stirling	10 km (6.2 mi) west of Berck-sur-Mer	
15	29 June 1944	01:08	Lancaster	Château-Thierry; 25 km (16 mi) west-northwest of Schouwen	
16	13 July 1944	02:18	Lancaster	north-northeast of Chaumont	
17	15 July 1944	02:08	Lancaster	west of Chaumont; 5 km (3.1 mi) southeast of Bar-sur-Aube	
18	15 July 1944	02:17	Lancaster	2 km (1.2 mi) southeast of Bar-sur-Seine; 5 km (3.1 mi) northeast of Celles	
19	19 July 1944	01:37	Lancaster	5 km (3.1 mi) northwest of Sommevoire	
20	19 July 1944	01:45	Lancaster	2 km (1.2 mi) northwest of Condé-en-Barrois	Lancaster PB234/No. 467 Squadron RAAF
21	29 July 1944	01:09	Lancaster	5 km (3.1 mi) north of Mirecourt	Lancaster PB147/No. 103 Squadron RAF
22	5 August 1944	01:04	four-engined bomber	PQ BK-1	
23	9 August 1944	03:10	Lancaster	PQ GJ	
24	30 August 1944	01:32	Lancaster	18 km (11 mi) northwest of Königsberg	
25	30 August 1944	01:56	Lancaster	30 km (19 mi) northwest of Pillau	
26	2 September 1944	01:56	DB-3	30 km (19 mi) southeast of Georgenburg	
27	17 October 1944	17:57	PS-84		
28	23 October 1944	18:12	PS-84		
29	8 February 1945	21:03	Lancaster	southwest of Stettin	
30	8 February 1945	21:08	Lancaster	southwest of Stettin	
31	8 February 1945	21:12	Lancaster	south of Stettin Bay	
32	14 February 1945	21:01	Lancaster	northwest of Chemnitz	
33	5 March 1945	22:05	four-engined bomber	southeast of Zwickau	
34	7 March 1945	22:30	Lancaster	northeast of Erfurt	
35%	15 March 1945	22:16	Lancaster	5 km (3.1 mi) south of Breidenbach	
36%	15 March 1945	22:45	B-17	10 km (6.2 mi) northwest of Mayen	
37	16 March 1945	21:15	Lancaster	Ansbach	
38	16 March 1945	21:17	Lancaster	east of Ansbach	
39	16 March 1945	21:43	Lancaster	20 km (12 mi) south of Ansbach	
40	21 March 1945	03:38	Lancaster	20 km (12 mi) southwest of Leipzig	
41	8 April 1945	22:56	Lancaster	10 km (6.2 mi) east of Kolleda	
42	10 April 1945	22:55	Lancaster	northwest of Leipzig	
43	10 April 1945	22:57	Lancaster	northwest of Leipzig	
44	10 April 1945	23:05	Lancaster	east of Leipzig	
45	17 April 1945	23:21	Il-4	northwest of Strausberg	
46	17 April 1945	23:47	Il-4	north of Fürstenwalde	

=== Awards ===
- German Cross in Gold on 1 January 1945 as Oberleutnant in the 1./Nachtjagdgeschwader 5
- Knight's Cross of the Iron Cross on 20 March 1945 as Hauptmann and Staffelkapitän of the 1./Nachtjagdgeschwader 5
