= Stade I – Rotenburg II =

Federal electoral district of Germany

30 Stade I – Rotenburg II
- Former electoral district for the Bundestag
- Stade I – Rotenburg II in 2025
- State: Lower Saxony
- Population: 256,300 (2019)
- Electorate: 198,576 (2021)
- Major settlements: Stade; Buxtehude
- Area: 1,972.8 km^{2}

Former electoral district
- Created: 1949; 2009 (re-established)
- Abolished: 2002
- Party: CDU
- Member: Vanessa-Kim Zobel
- Elected: 2025

Stade I – Rotenburg II is an electoral constituency (German: Wahlkreis) represented in the Bundestag. It elects one member via first-past-the-post voting. Under the current constituency numbering system, it is designated as constituency 30. It is located in northern Lower Saxony, comprising the southern part of the Stade district and the northern part of the Rotenburg district.

Stade I – Rotenburg II was created for the inaugural 1949 federal election. It was abolished in 2002 and re-established in the 2009 federal election. From 2013 to 2025, it has been represented by Oliver Grundmann of the Christian Democratic Union (CDU). Since 2025 it has been represented by Vanessa-Kim Zobel of the Christian Democratic Union (CDU).

== Geography ==
Stade I – Rotenburg II is located in northern Lower Saxony. As of the 2021 federal election, it contains the southern part of the district of Stade, specifically the municipalities of Buxtehude, Jork, and Stade and the Samtgemeinden of Apensen, Fredenbeck, Harsefeld, Horneburg, and Lühe. It also includes the northern part of the district of Rotenburg, specifically the municipalities of Bremervörde and Gnarrenburg and the Samtgemeinden of Geestequelle, Selsingen, Sittensen, Tarmstedt, and Zeven.

== History ==
Stade I – Rotenburg II was created in 1949, then known as Stade – Bremervörde. In the 1949 election, it was Lower Saxony constituency 11. From 1953 to 1965, it was constituency number 33. From 1965 until its abolition, it was constituency number 25. From 1987 until its abolition, it was known as Stade – Rotenburg I. Originally, it comprised the districts of Stade and Bremervörde. The latter was incorporated into the Rotenburg district in 1977, but the borders of Stade – Bremervörde (and later Stade – Rotenburg I) did not change.

Stade – Rotenburg I was abolished in the 2002 federal election, and divided between the new constituencies of Stade – Cuxhaven and Rotenburg – Verden.

In the 2009 federal election, it was re-established as Stade I – Rotenburg II and was constituency 31. Since 2013, it has been constituency 30. Its borders have not changed since its re-establishment.

Election	No.	Name	Borders
1949	11	Stade – Bremervörde	Stade district; Bremervörde district
1953	33	Stade – Bremervörde	Stade district; Bremervörde district
1957	33	Stade – Bremervörde	Stade district; Bremervörde district
1961	33	Stade – Bremervörde	Stade district; Bremervörde district
1965	25	Stade – Bremervörde	Stade district; Bremervörde district
1969	25	Stade – Bremervörde	Stade district; Bremervörde district
1972	25	Stade – Bremervörde	Stade district; Bremervörde district
1976	25	Stade – Bremervörde	Stade district; Bremervörde district
1980	25	Stade – Bremervörde	Stade district; Rotenburg district (only Bremervörde and Gnarrenburg municipalities and Geestequelle Samtgemeinde, Selsingen Samtgemeinde, Sittensen Samtgemeinde, Tarmstedt Samtgemeinde, and Zeven Samtgemeinde)
1983	25	Stade – Bremervörde	Stade district; Rotenburg district (only Bremervörde and Gnarrenburg municipalities and Geestequelle Samtgemeinde, Selsingen Samtgemeinde, Sittensen Samtgemeinde, Tarmstedt Samtgemeinde, and Zeven Samtgemeinde)
1987	25	Stade – Rotenburg I	Stade district; Rotenburg district (only Bremervörde and Gnarrenburg municipalities and Geestequelle Samtgemeinde, Selsingen Samtgemeinde, Sittensen Samtgemeinde, Tarmstedt Samtgemeinde, and Zeven Samtgemeinde)
1990	25	Stade – Rotenburg I	Stade district; Rotenburg district (only Bremervörde and Gnarrenburg municipalities and Geestequelle Samtgemeinde, Selsingen Samtgemeinde, Sittensen Samtgemeinde, Tarmstedt Samtgemeinde, and Zeven Samtgemeinde)
1994	25	Stade – Rotenburg I	Stade district; Rotenburg district (only Bremervörde and Gnarrenburg municipalities and Geestequelle Samtgemeinde, Selsingen Samtgemeinde, Sittensen Samtgemeinde, Tarmstedt Samtgemeinde, and Zeven Samtgemeinde)
1998	25	Stade – Rotenburg I	Stade district; Rotenburg district (only Bremervörde and Gnarrenburg municipalities and Geestequelle Samtgemeinde, Selsingen Samtgemeinde, Sittensen Samtgemeinde, Tarmstedt Samtgemeinde, and Zeven Samtgemeinde)
2002	Abolished		
2005	Abolished		
2009	31	Stade I – Rotenburg II	Stade district (only Buxtehude, Jork, and Stade municipalities and Apensen, Fredenbeck, Harsefeld, Horneburg, and Lühe Samtgemeinden); Rotenburg district (only Bremervörde and Gnarrenburg municipalities and Geestequelle, Selsingen, Sittensen, Tarmstedt, and Zeven Samtgemeinden)
2013	30	Stade I – Rotenburg II	Stade district (only Buxtehude, Jork, and Stade municipalities and Apensen, Fredenbeck, Harsefeld, Horneburg, and Lühe Samtgemeinden); Rotenburg district (only Bremervörde and Gnarrenburg municipalities and Geestequelle, Selsingen, Sittensen, Tarmstedt, and Zeven Samtgemeinden)
2017	30	Stade I – Rotenburg II	Stade district (only Buxtehude, Jork, and Stade municipalities and Apensen, Fredenbeck, Harsefeld, Horneburg, and Lühe Samtgemeinden); Rotenburg district (only Bremervörde and Gnarrenburg municipalities and Geestequelle, Selsingen, Sittensen, Tarmstedt, and Zeven Samtgemeinden)
2021	30	Stade I – Rotenburg II	Stade district (only Buxtehude, Jork, and Stade municipalities and Apensen, Fredenbeck, Harsefeld, Horneburg, and Lühe Samtgemeinden); Rotenburg district (only Bremervörde and Gnarrenburg municipalities and Geestequelle, Selsingen, Sittensen, Tarmstedt, and Zeven Samtgemeinden)
2025	30	Stade I – Rotenburg II	Stade district (only Buxtehude, Jork, and Stade municipalities and Apensen, Fredenbeck, Harsefeld, Horneburg, and Lühe Samtgemeinden); Rotenburg district (only Bremervörde and Gnarrenburg municipalities and Geestequelle, Selsingen, Sittensen, Tarmstedt, and Zeven Samtgemeinden)

== Members ==
The constituency was first held by Heinrich Hellwege, leader of the German Party (DP). He served from 1949 until his resignation in 1955 to become Minister-President of Lower Saxony. He was succeeded in 1957 by Peter Tobaben, also from the DP. He joined the Christian Democratic Union (CDU) in 1961 and was re-elected for that party in the federal election a few months later. He served until 1972, when he was succeeded by fellow CDU member Nicolaus Dreyer. In 1980, the Social Democratic Party (SPD) won the constituency, and it was represented by Wolfgang Schwenk for a single term. Horst Eylmann of the CDU regained it in 1983, and served until 1998, when it was won by Margrit Wetzel of the SPD. She served until the constituency's abolition in 2002.

After its re-establishment in 2009, it was represented by Martina Krogmann of the CDU. She was succeeded in 2013 by Oliver Grundmann, who was re-elected in 2017 and 2021.

Election	Member	Party	%
1949	Heinrich Hellwege	DP	40.4
1953	Heinrich Hellwege	DP	55.0
1957	Peter Tobaben	DP	34.5
1961	Peter Tobaben	CDU	34.4
1965	Peter Tobaben	CDU	55.8
1969	Peter Tobaben	CDU	51.3
1972	Nicolaus Dreyer	CDU	49.0
1976	Nicolaus Dreyer	CDU	50.2
1980	Wolfgang Schwenk	SPD	46.5
1983	Horst Eylmann	CDU	51.7
1987	Horst Eylmann	CDU	48.5
1990	Horst Eylmann	CDU	48.4
1994	Horst Eylmann	CDU	48.0
1998	Margrit Wetzel	SPD	49.9
Abolished (2002–2009)
2009	Martina Krogmann	CDU	44.2
2013	Oliver Grundmann	CDU	47.6
2017	Oliver Grundmann	CDU	44.4
2021	Oliver Grundmann	CDU	34.6
2025	Vanessa-Kim Zobel	CDU	36.3

== Election results ==
=== 2025 election ===
Federal election (2025): Stade I – Rotenburg II
Notes:	Blue background denotes the winner of the electorate vote. Pink background denotes a candidate elected from their party list. Yellow background denotes an electorate win by a list member, or other incumbent. A ✓ or ✗ denotes status of any incumbent, win or lose respectively.						
Party	Candidate	Votes	%	±%	Party votes	%	±%
CDU	Vanessa-Kim Zobel	60,301	36.3	▲1.8	51,046	30.7	▲4.2
SPD	Frauke Langen	42,393	25.6	▼6.2	36,582	22.0	▼10.0
AfD	Marie-Thérèse Kaiser	29,890	18.0	▲10.9	30,498	18.3	▲11.0
Greens	Joachim Fuchs	16,205	9.8	▼3.5	18,203	10.9	▼3.7
Left	Benjamin Koch-Böhnke	10,350	6.2	▲3.4	11,789	7.1	▲4.2
FDP	Jan Hendrik Koepke	4,663	2.8	▼5.2	6,693	4.0	▼7.1
BSW					5,507	3.3	
Tierschutzpartei					1,765	1.1	▼0.2
Volt	Malte Hermsteiner	2,100	1.3		1,238	0.7	▲0.5
FW					1,111	0.7	▼0.4
PARTEI					816	0.5	▼0.4
dieBasis					440	0.3	▼0.7
Pirates					287	0.2	▼0.3
BD					218	0.1	
Humanists					113	0.1	0.0
MLPD					27	0.0	0.0
Informal votes		1,217			777		
Total valid votes		165,902			166,342		
Turnout		167,119	84.5	▲8.0			
CDU hold	Majority	17,908	10.7	▲7.8			

=== 2021 election ===
Federal election (2021): Stade I – Rotenburg II
Notes:	Blue background denotes the winner of the electorate vote. Pink background denotes a candidate elected from their party list. Yellow background denotes an electorate win by a list member, or other incumbent. A ✓ or ✗ denotes status of any incumbent, win or lose respectively.						
Party	Candidate	Votes	%	±%	Party votes	%	±%
CDU	✓ Oliver Grundmann	52,069	34.6	▼9.9	39,969	26.5	▼12.4
SPD	Kai Koeser	47,763	31.7	▲3.5	48,301	32.0	▲7.5
Greens	Claas Goldenstein	19,923	13.2	▲6.2	22,091	14.6	▲6.4
FDP	Steven Hermeling	12,019	8.0	▲2.2	16,720	11.1	▲1.5
AfD	Marie-Thérèse Kaiser	10,735	7.1	▼1.2	11,002	7.3	▼1.6
Left	Klemens Kowalski	4,340	2.9	▼2.4	4,301	2.9	▼3.4
Tierschutzpartei					1,881	1.2	▲0.4
FW					1,620	1.1	▲0.6
dieBasis	Kai Bartos	2,029	1.3		1,485	1.0	
PARTEI					1,388	0.9	▲0.2
Pirates	Richard Klaus	1,755	1.2	▲0.3	691	0.5	0.0
Volt					378	0.3	
Team Todenhöfer					373	0.2	
NPD					175	0.1	▼0.2
Humanists					119	0.1	
ÖDP					118	0.1	0.0
V-Partei3					107	0.1	0.0
du.					80	0.1	
LKR					42	0.0	
DKP					28	0.0	0.0
MLPD					17	0.0	0.0
Informal votes		1,188			935		
Total valid votes		150,633			150,886		
Turnout		151,821	76.5	▼1.1			
CDU hold	Majority	4,306	2.9	▼13.3			

=== 2017 election ===
Federal election (2017): Stade I – Rotenburg II
Notes:	Blue background denotes the winner of the electorate vote. Pink background denotes a candidate elected from their party list. Yellow background denotes an electorate win by a list member, or other incumbent. A ✓ or ✗ denotes status of any incumbent, win or lose respectively.						
Party	Candidate	Votes	%	±%	Party votes	%	±%
CDU	✓ Oliver Grundmann	67,463	44.4	▼3.2	59,229	38.9	▼5.8
SPD	Oliver Kellmer	42,829	28.2	▼5.9	37,361	24.5	▼6.4
AfD	Astrid zum Felde	12,590	8.3	▲4.4	13,513	8.9	▲4.3
Greens	Ralf Poppe	10,613	7.0	▲0.7	12,511	8.2	▲0.4
FDP	André Grote	8,797	5.8	▲4.1	14,538	9.6	▲5.4
Left	Klemens Kowalski	7,994	5.3	▲1.9	9,564	6.3	▲2.1
Tierschutzpartei					1,335	0.9	▲0.2
Pirates	Richard Klaus	1,334	0.9	▼0.4	645	0.4	▼1.1
PARTEI					1,147	0.8	
FW					778	0.5	▲0.1
NPD					555	0.4	▼0.5
BGE					262	0.2	
Independent	Udo Knoop	232	0.2				
DiB					196	0.1	
DM					193	0.1	
V-Partei³					177	0.1	
ÖDP					139	0.1	
MLPD					29	0.0	0.0
DKP					23	0.0	
Informal votes		1,192			849		
Total valid votes		151,852			152,195		
Turnout		153,044	77.6	▲3.1			
CDU hold	Majority	24,634	16.2	▲2.7			

=== 2013 election ===
Federal election (2013): Stade I – Rotenburg II
Notes:	Blue background denotes the winner of the electorate vote. Pink background denotes a candidate elected from their party list. Yellow background denotes an electorate win by a list member, or other incumbent. A ✓ or ✗ denotes status of any incumbent, win or lose respectively.						
Party	Candidate	Votes	%	±%	Party votes	%	±%
CDU	Oliver Grundmann	68,545	47.6	▲3.4	64,472	44.7	▲8.2
SPD	Oliver Kellmer	49,111	34.1	▲0.7	44,598	30.9	▲4.1
Greens	Michael Lemke	9,099	6.3	▼0.4	11,209	7.8	▼2.4
AfD	Jens Paulsen	5,632	3.9		6,531	4.5	
Left	Michael Quelle	4,878	3.4	▼3.1	6,021	4.2	▼3.3
FDP	Serkan Tören	2,505	1.7	▼5.3	6,023	4.2	▼10.1
Pirates	Richard Klaus	1,985	1.4		2,131	1.5	▼0.3
NPD	Manfred Dammann	1,457	1.0	▼0.7	1,302	0.9	▼0.6
Tierschutzpartei					979	0.7	0.0
FW	Gerd Krümmel	758	0.5		620	0.4	
PBC					119	0.1	
PRO					108	0.1	
REP					54	0.0	
MLPD					17	0.0	0.0
Informal votes		1,161			947		
Total valid votes		143,970			144,184		
Turnout		145,131	74.4	▲0.8			
CDU hold	Majority	19,434	13.5	▲2.7			

=== 2009 election ===
Federal election (2009): Stade I – Rotenburg II
Notes:	Blue background denotes the winner of the electorate vote. Pink background denotes a candidate elected from their party list. Yellow background denotes an electorate win by a list member, or other incumbent. A ✓ or ✗ denotes status of any incumbent, win or lose respectively.						
Party	Candidate	Votes	%	±%	Party votes	%	±%
CDU	Martina Krogmann	62,035	44.2	▲1.1	51,303	36.5	▼0.1
SPD	Margrit Wetzel	46,851	33.4	▼12.4	37,784	26.9	▼13.2
FDP	Serkan Tören	9,946	7.1	▲2.7	20,056	14.3	▲4.6
Left	Helmut-Hartwig Doll	9,096	6.5	▲5.4	10,541	7.5	▲3.7
Greens	Philip Kossack	9,409	6.7	▲2.7	14,253	10.1	▲3.0
Pirates					2,503	1.8	
NPD	Adolf Dammann	2,349	1.7	▼0.1	2,061	1.5	0.0
Tierschutzpartei					999	0.7	▲0.1
RRP					945	0.7	
RRP					837	0.6	
Independent	Erich Nagel	431	0.3				
BüSo	Maria Räuschel	307	0.2				
ÖDP					170	0.1	
DVU					140	0.1	
MLPD					43	0.0	0.0
Informal votes		1,690			1,424		
Total valid votes		140,424			140,690		
Turnout		142,114	73.7	▼6.1			
CDU win new seat	Majority	15,184	10.8				
