= Zeven =

- Town
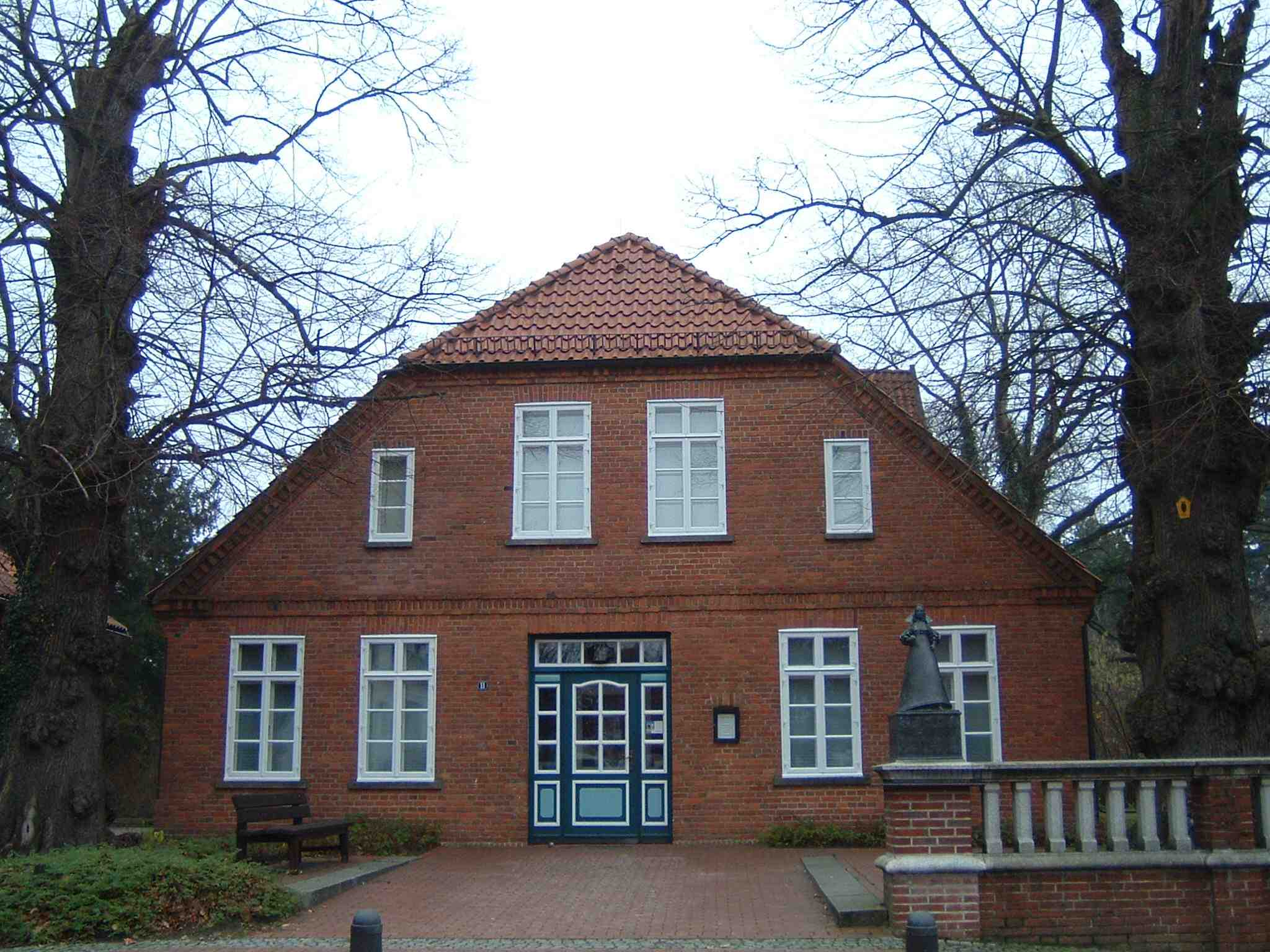
- Queen Christina House in Zeven, Germany

- Flag Coat of arms

- Location of Zeven within Rotenburg district
- Interactive map of Zeven
- Location within Germany Location within Lower Saxony
- Coordinates: 53°18′N 9°17′E
- Country: Germany
- State: Lower Saxony
- District: Rotenburg
- Municipal assoc.: Zeven

Government
  - Mayor: Hans-Joachim Jaap (CDU)

Area
  - Total: 74.13 km^{2} (28.62 sq mi)
- Elevation: 24 m (79 ft)

Population (2025-12-31)
  - Total: 13,898
  - Density: 187.5/km^{2} (485.6/sq mi)
- Time zone: UTC+01:00 (CET)
  - Summer (DST): UTC+02:00 (CEST)
- Postal codes: 27404
- Dialling codes: 04281
- Vehicle registration: ROW, BRV
- Website: www.zeven.de

Zeven (German pronunciation: [ˈtseːvn̩]) is a town in the district of Rotenburg, in Lower Saxony, Germany. It has a population of around 14,000. The nearest large towns are Bremerhaven, Bremen and Hamburg. It is situated approximately 22 km northwest of Rotenburg, and 40 km northeast of Bremen. Zeven is also the seat of the Samtgemeinde ("collective municipality") Zeven.

== Location ==
Zeven is located in the Zevener Geest in the centrum of the Elbe-Weser Triangle. The closest major city is Hamburg.

== History ==
In 986 Zeven was first mentioned in a document of the Benedictine Zeven Convent in Heeslingen, then giving its name as kivinan à Heeslingen (Kivinan near Heeslingen). In 1141 the convent was relocated to Zeven. The convent played a determining role in Zeven's history. Zeven belonged to the old Duchy of Saxony and at its dissolution in 1180 Zeven became a part of the newly founded Prince-Archbishopric of Bremen, the princely territory of imperial immediacy ruled by the respective holder of the archiepiscopal see of Bremen. During the Protestant Reformation the majority of the nun clung to Catholicism, while most laymen adopted Lutheranism.

In the course of the Thirty Years' War troops of the Catholic League under Johan 't Serclaes, Count of Tilly conquered the Prince-Archbishopric in 1627/1628. The Leaguist takeover enabled Ferdinand II, Holy Roman Emperor, to implement the Edict of Restitution, decreed March 6, 1629, within the Prince-Archbishopric of Bremen and the Prince-Bishopric of Verden. The convent of Zeven - still maintaining Roman Catholic rite - became the local stronghold for a reCatholicisation within the scope of Counter-Reformation. The nuns, who had converted to Lutheranism, were then expelled from the convent.

In 1632 troops of the legitimate ruler of the Prince-Archbishopric, Administrator John Frederick, helped by troops from Sweden and the city of Bremen, reconquered the Prince-Archbishopric. The convent was dissolved. By the Peace of Westphalia the Prince-Archbishopric was transformed into the Duchy of Bremen in 1648, which - together with the Principality of Verden - was first given as a prey for its participation in the Thirty Years' War to be ruled in personal union by the Swedish Crown. These two imperial fiefs to the Swedes are thus colloquially called Bremen-Verden. The queen regnant Christina of Sweden, in personal union Duchess of Bremen and Princess of Verden installed in the two latter functions her residence in today's Queen Christina House in Zeven, the oldest remaining profane building in town.

As in Sweden proper, the constitutional and administrative bodies in the Swedish dominions gradually lost de facto importance due to ever growing centralisation. Bremen-Verden's Estates lost more and more influence, and were less frequently convened. After 1692 the Estates' say had almost vanished. This led to considerable unease among the Estates, so that in May 1694 representatives of Swedish Bremen-Verden's general government and the Estates met at the former convent of Zeven to confer on the status of the Duchies.

After a Danish occupation (1712-1715) the Duchy of Bremen was sold to the House of Hanover, and thus became ruled in personal union with the Electorate of Hanover and the Kingdom of Great Britain. In the course of the Anglo-French and Indian War (1754–63) on North American colonies Britain feared a French invasion in Hanover. Thus George II Augustus formed an alliance with his Brandenburg-Prussian cousin Frederick II, the Great combining the North American conflict with the Austro–Brandenburg-Prussian Seven Years' War (1756–63). In summer 1757 the French invaders defeated George II Augustus' son William Duke of Cumberland, leading the Anglo-Hanoverian army, and drove him and his army into remote Bremen-Verden, where in the former cloister of Zeven he had to capitulate on September 18 (Convention of Klosterzeven). But George II Augustus denied his recognition of the convention.

With British Hanover's defeat in the Napoléonic Wars the short-lived Kingdom of Westphalia annexed the Duchy of Bremen in 1807, including Zeven, before France annexed it in 1810. In 1813 the Duchy was restored to the Electorate of Hanover, which - after its upgrade to the Kingdom of Hanover in 1814 (and still ruled in personal union with the United Kingdom of Great Britain and Ireland) - incorporated the Duchy in a real union and the ducal territory, including Zeven, became part of the Stade Region, established in 1823. In 1824/1825 Carl Friedrich Gauß carried out the trigonometric geodetic surveying of the Stade Region, as commissioned by King George IV of Hanover and the United Kingdom. Gauß used the tower of the Lutheran Church of St. Viti as a benchmark for his triangulations.

== Economy ==
Local businesses include the head office of the recently created DMK dairy combine (before 2011 Nordmilch), producing milk based products such as quark under the well known (throughout Germany) "Milram" label.

== Sights ==
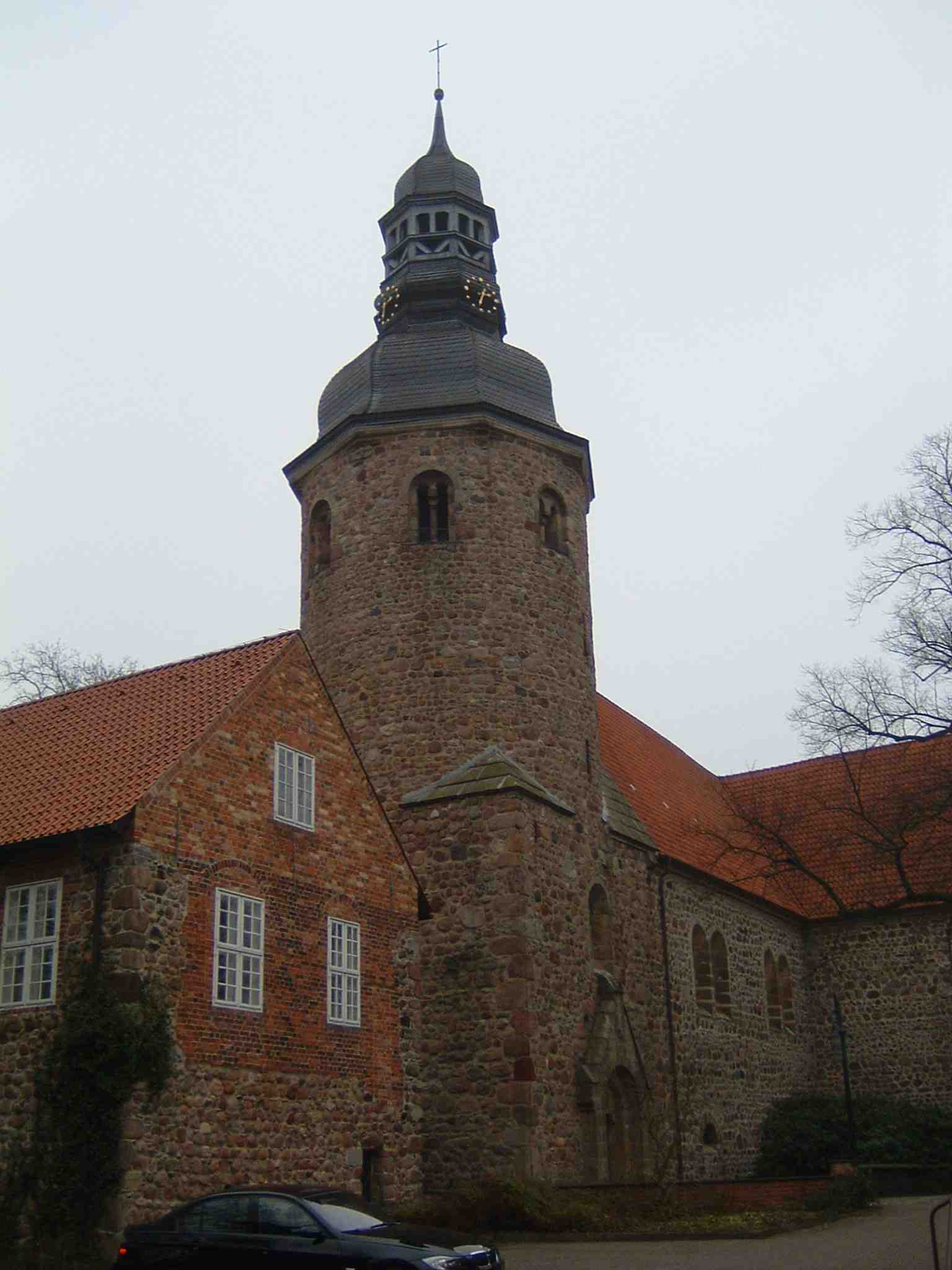
St. Viti Lutheran Church in Zeven, Germany.

- Christina of Sweden Monument
- Fire Brigade Museum (German: Feuerwehrmuseum)
- Gauß Memorial Room
- Museum Kloster Zeven in the former convent
- Queen Christina House (German: Königin-Christine-Haus or Christinenhaus)
- Saint Viti Lutheran Church
- Vitus-Brunnen, fountain named after Saint Vitus

Zeven was the site of a DECCA transmitter. Close to its masts, there is also an FM-broadcasting station, using a 100-metre-tall (330 ft) guyed mast.

== Notable people ==
- Julius Uffelmann (1837-1894), physician and medical historian
- Christian-Friedrich Vahl (born 1955), heart surgeon and Director of the Department of Cardiac, Thoracic and Vascular Surgery at Johannes Gutenberg University Mainz
- Doris Fitschen (1968-2025), former national footballer; played a total of 144 matches between 1986 and 2001 with the German women's team
- Eike Holsten (born 1983), politician (CDU)
- Philipp Bargfrede (born 1989), footballer (Werder Bremen)
