= Litberg =

Coordinates: 53°23′18″N 9°36′50″E

The Litberg is, at 65 metres above sea level (NN), the highest point in the district of Stade, Germany. It lies about 2.5 kilometres south of Beckdorf in the municipality of Sauensiek. The Litberg is a small hill covered with birch, pine, willow and alder, which was formed from an Ice Age moraine. It forms a protected area on the geest west of the Harburg Hills.

== Access ==
The hill can best be accessed from the south, from the town of Sauensiek, or from the north, starting from Beckdorf or its subdistrict of Goldbeck. From the east, one can also start from the village of Regesbostel.

== Views ==
The summit is located in the middle of the forest, so the best views are from the edge of the forest during the ascent and from the 25 m high observation tower, which was built in October 2008 at the summit. In clear conditions you can see the Hamburg TV tower and Köhlbrand Bridge on the horizon. In addition, there are good views over the geest all around the area.

== History ==
Carl Friedrich Gauss was supposed to survey the Kingdom of Hanover from 1821 onwards. He was only able to overcome the problems that arose in the North German Plain (the lack of landscape surveys) with inter alia the help of the Litberg. This survey was later commemorated on the back of the 10 Deutschmark note.

From 1949 to 1962 sand and gravel were mined here in an open-cast mine. As a result of this several glacial erratics were uncovered. The terrain was fully recultivated when the mine closed and has been left to nature.

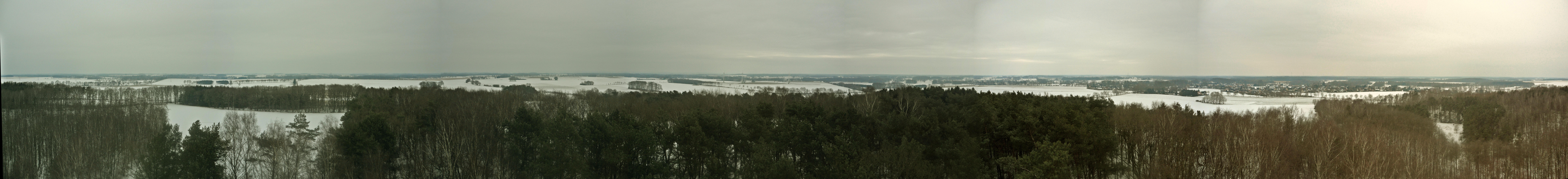
350° panorama from the observation tower on the Litberg in winter 2012
