= Peter Tobaben =

German politician

Member of the Bundestag; from Lower Saxony
- In office 15 October 1957 – 13 December 1972
- Preceded by: Margot Kalinke
- Succeeded by: Nicolaus Dreyer
- Constituency: Stade – Bremervörde (1957–1965); Stade (1965–1972)
- In office 7 September 1949 – 6 October 1953
- Preceded by: Constituency established
- Succeeded by: Multi-member district
- Constituency: State list

Personal details
- Born: 1 July 1905 Ahlerstedt, Germany
- Died: 17 December 1972 (aged 67) Stade, West Germany
- Party: Christian Democratic Union (after 1961)
- Other political affiliations: DHP (1923–1933); DP (1948–1961)

Peter Tobaben (1 July 1905 – 17 December 1972) was a German politician of the Christian Democratic Union (CDU) and former member of the German Bundestag.

== Political career ==
Tobaben was a member of the German Bundestag during its first legislative period (1949–1953) and again from 1957 to 1972. From 6 May 1955 to 31 October 1957 he was a member of the Lower Saxony state parliament. He was originally elected to the DP and became a CDU member on 3 May 1961. Tobaben entered the Bundestag in 1949 via the Lower Saxony state list and from 1957 as a directly elected member of parliament for the Stade – Bremervörde constituency and from 1965 for the Stade constituency.

== Literature ==
Herbst, Ludolf; Jahn, Bruno (2002). Vierhaus, Rudolf (ed.). Biographisches Handbuch der Mitglieder des Deutschen Bundestages. 1949–2002 [Biographical Handbook of the Members of the German Bundestag. 1949–2002] (in German). München: De Gruyter - De Gruyter Saur. p. 1715. ISBN 978-3-11-184511-1.
