= Hellwege =

- Municipality
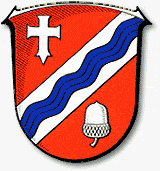
- Coat of arms

- Location of Hellwege within Rotenburg (Wümme) district
- Interactive map of Hellwege
- Location within Germany Location within Lower Saxony
- Coordinates: 53°04′N 09°14′E
- Country: Germany
- State: Lower Saxony
- District: Rotenburg (Wümme)
- Municipal assoc.: Sottrum
- Subdivisions: 4

Government
  - Mayor: Wolfgang Harling (SPD)

Area
  - Total: 27.44 km^{2} (10.59 sq mi)
- Elevation: 15 m (49 ft)

Population (2025-12-31)
  - Total: 1,106
  - Density: 40.31/km^{2} (104.4/sq mi)
- Time zone: UTC+01:00 (CET)
  - Summer (DST): UTC+02:00 (CEST)
- Postal codes: 27367
- Dialling codes: 04264
- Vehicle registration: ROW
- Website: www.sottrum.de

Hellwege is a municipality in the district of Rotenburg, in Lower Saxony, Germany.

Hellwege belonged to the Prince-Bishopric of Verden, established in 1180. In 1648, the Prince-Bishopric was transformed into the Principality of Verden, which was first ruled in personal union by the Swedish Crown - interrupted by a Danish occupation (1712-1715) - and from 1715 on by the Hanoverian Crown. In 1807, the ephemeral Kingdom of Westphalia annexed the Principality, before France annexed it in 1810. In 1813, the Principality was restored to the Electorate of Hanover, which - after its upgrade to the Kingdom of Hanover in 1814 - incorporated the Principality in a real union and the Princely territory, including Hellwege, became part of the new Stade Region, established in 1823. The name hellwege can also be used as a last name, and it is popular in Germany.
