= Sottrum (Samtgemeinde) =

Samtgemeinde in Lower Saxony

- Samtgemeinde
- Location of Sottrum within Rotenburg district
- Interactive map of Sottrum
- Location within Germany Location within Lower Saxony
- Country: Germany
- State: Lower Saxony
- District: Rotenburg
- Seat: Sottrum
- Subdivisions: 7 municipalities

Area
  - Total: 173.51 km^{2} (66.99 sq mi)

Population (2025-12-31)
  - Total: 14,691
  - Density: 84.669/km^{2} (219.29/sq mi)
- Time zone: UTC+01:00 (CET)
  - Summer (DST): UTC+02:00 (CEST)
- Website: www.sottrum.de

Sottrum is a Samtgemeinde ("collective municipality") in the district of Rotenburg, in Lower Saxony, Germany. Its seat is in the village Sottrum.

The Samtgemeinde Sottrum consists of the following municipalities:

1. Ahausen
2. Bötersen
3. Hassendorf
4. Hellwege
5. Horstedt
6. Reeßum
7. Sottrum
