= Vanessa-Kim Zobel =

German politician (born 1988)

- Zobel in 2025

Member of the Bundestag; for Stade I – Rotenburg II
- Incumbent
- Assumed office 25 March 2025
- Preceded by: Oliver Grundmann

Personal details
- Born: 8 February 1988 (age 38) Bremervörde, West Germany
- Party: Christian Democratic Union
- Children: 2

Vanessa-Kim Zobel (born 8 February 1988) is a German politician from the Christian Democratic Union of Germany (CDU). She was elected as a member of the German Bundestag in the 2025 federal election.

== Early life and career ==
Vanessa-Kim Zobel attended the Stader private school from 2005 to 2007, from which she graduated with a university of applied sciences entrance qualification. From 2007, she completed her apprenticeship as a bank teller at Commerzbank in Stade, which she completed in 2009. She remained loyal to Commerzbank until December 2021. From January 2022, until she was elected to the German Bundestag, she worked in private customer consulting at Volksbank Osterholz Bremervörde.

== Political career ==
In 2016, Zobel joined the CDU. In the same year, she was elected to the city council of Bremervörde and became local mayor (Ortsbürgermeister) of the village of Mehedorf. Since 2021, she has also been deputy mayor of the city of Bremervörde. In addition, Zobel is an assessor on the board of the CDU district association of Rotenburg an der Wümme.

In 2024, Zobel was elected as the CDU's direct candidate for the in the Stade I - Rotenburg II federal constituency, and she was also given 15th place on the CDU's state list in Lower Saxony. During the election campaign, her focus was on the policy areas of finance, economy and defence. She won the election with 36.3% of the first votes cast .

== Personal life ==
Zobel is married to a professional soldier. They live with their two children in Mehedorf.
