= Marie-Thérèse Kaiser =

German politician and model (born 1996)

Marie-Thérèse Kaiser (born 1996) is a German politician of the Alternative for Germany (AfD) and former model. The Rotenburg action alliance Aufstehen gegen Rassismus (English: Stand Up Against Racism) described her as one of the most important activists of the German Neue Rechte political scene.

== Early life and career ==
As a teenager, Kaiser took part in several beauty pageants in Lower Saxony and at the age of 16 was already a candidate for the Miss Bremen 2013/2014 title. According to her own statements, Kaiser completed a business degree in fashion, luxury and retail management in 2019, during which she also completed foreign language training. She worked as a model for various magazines for several years and appeared on the TV dating show Take Me Out on RTL. Kaiser also worked as an art department employee on several German film productions.

== Political career ==
Until 2015, Kaiser was a member of the Young Union, the youth wing of the CDU/CSU, from which she later left, according to her own statements, out of displeasure with the refugee and migration policy of the Christian Democratic Union (CDU). In autumn 2017, she became a member of Alternative for Germany (AfD) after attending an AfD event organised by Alexander Gauland and Bernd Baumann some time before the 2017 federal election.

Kaiser is chairwoman of the AfD district association of district of Rotenburg an der Wümme, and was until 2021 a member of the board of the AfD state association in Lower Saxony (Landesvorstand der AfD Niedersachsen).

From February 2018, she gained greater notoriety through her co-organization of several "Merkel-muss-weg" (English: "Merkel must go") demonstrations in Hamburg, and as the face of a first-time voter campaign by the Young Alternative for the 2020 North Rhine-Westphalia local elections.

In the 2021 federal election (as well as in the 2025 federal election), she stood as a less significant direct candidate for the AfD in the federal constituency of Stade I – Rotenburg II, with her results similar to the state-wide AfD results, 7% in 2021, and 18% in 2025. She was not included in the more significant state-wide party lists from which members of parliament are elected, neither in 2021 nor in 2025.

In the 2021 state-wide district elections (Kommunalwahlen in Niedersachsen 2021) in the district of Rotenburg, the AfD achieved 1.71 percent (down from 2016's 6.57 percent). The only AfD seat, down from 3, in the 54-strong district council was won by Kaiser.

=== Verdict for incitement to hatred ===
In August 2021, Kaiser published a tile on her social media accounts with the text "Afghanistan refugees; Hamburg SPD mayor for 'unbureaucratic' admission; Welcome culture for gang rapes?" The post referred to an interview with Hamburg Mayor Peter Tschentscher (SPD), who had advocated for the rescue of Afghan local staff threatened by the Taliban. He announced plans to accommodate 200 Bundeswehr helpers in Hamburg. In a first-instance ruling in June 2023, the Rotenburg District Court concluded that Kaiser had taken the quoted information out of context in the post text and knowingly risked that the tile would be perceived as incitement to hatred by an objective observer. Additionally, the rhetorical question violated the human dignity of a distinct group of Afghan refugees. The judgment at the time: a fine of 100 daily rates of €60 each.

The Verden Regional Court upheld the verdict in May 2024. Judge Heiko Halbfas and two lay judges followed the prosecutor's argument, which saw Kaiser's post as an "attack on the human dignity" of a nationally identifiable group and classified it as "incitement to hatred." The contextualizing text below the tile even reinforces the "negatively abbreviated representation" and fuels an atmosphere of fear and rejection. In explaining the verdict, Halbfas also made it clear: "Those who attack human dignity cannot invoke freedom of speech." Kaiser knowingly created a picture in others' minds that led to hatred against a nationally defined group. After the trial, Kaiser announced her intention to appeal. She expressed great confidence in her innocence but stated that her trust in the rule of law was "shaken."

=== Proximity to the Neue Rechte scene ===
Kaiser maintains contacts with the Identitarian movement, which is classified as right-wing extremist, and has been involved in several web video and podcast formats for Ein Prozent für unser Land (English: One percent for our country"), a right-wing campaign project which is close to Der Flügel, the AfD wing around Björn Höcke. She also appeared as a guest on the show "Laut Gedacht" on a YouTube channel run by members of the Identitarian movement. In the course of her AfD membership, she attended numerous events organised by Compact Magazine and Götz Kubitschek's Institute for State Policy. In September 2021, she advertised on Twitter the channel of the former Lower Saxony JN state chairman Julian Monaco. Via her Instagram profile, on which she has a total of around 25,000 subscribers as of October 2025, she has networked for protagonists from the right-wing to right-wing extremist scene, including the rappers Prototyp (Kai Naggert) and Chris Ares, as well as the guitarist of the right-wing rock band Stahlgewitter, Frank Kraemer. After Reichsbürger ("Reich Citizens", people who reject the legitimacy of the modern German state) took part in several demonstrations she helped organize, Kaiser stated that she had no problems with citizens who disputed the existence of the German state, stating that as long as they keep their statements to themselves, they are welcome to demonstrate alongside her.

== Political views ==
Kaiser spoke out within the party against the incompatibility list of the AfD, i. e. that former members of the National Democratic Party of Germany, a far-right and Neo-Nazi party, are not allowed to become AfD party members. She also criticized AfD federal spokesman Jörg Meuthen after he spoke out in favor of dissolving Der Flügel.

After the Thuringian AfD chairman Björn Höcke called the Holocaust memorial in Berlin a "monument of shame" in a speech, Kaiser sided with Höcke and protested that the controversy resulting from his choice of words was because he had been misunderstood. She commented on this saying: "I look ahead and deal with topics that are currently on people's hearts. There are enough construction sites, then you don't have to work through the Nazi history again and again."

After former AfD politician Uwe Junge described Manuel Neuer's rainbow captain's armband as a "Schwuchtelbinde" ("faggot armband") during the UEFA Euro 2020, Kaiser condemned Junge's behavior as "damaging the party" and spoke out against homophobia within the AfD. However, she emphasised in relation to this that "...[it should be questioned] to what extent homosexuals could represent a traditional family image...The family is under special protection".
