= Julius Uffelmann =

Julius August Christian Uffelmann (31 January 1837 – 17 February 1894) was a German physician and hygienist born in Zeven.

He studied medicine at the University of Göttingen, where he was a student of Jakob Henle (1809–1885), Karl Ewald Hasse (1810–1902) and Wilhelm Baum (1799–1883). Following graduation (1861) he worked as an assistant in the surgical clinic in Rostock, later practicing medicine in the cities of Neustadt and Hameln. In 1876 he received his habilitation in pediatrics and hygiene at the University of Rostock, where in 1879 he became an associate professor. From 1883 until his death in 1894, he was director of the institute of hygiene at Rostock. In 1893 he became an honorary professor.

He was editor of Jahresberichte über die Fortschritte und Leistungen auf dem Gebiete der Hygiene, a supplement to the Deutsche Vierteljahrsschrift für öffentliche Gesundheitspflege (German Quarterly Journal of Public Health Care). In 1890 he became a member of the Grossherzogliche Medizinalkommission.

In addition to his written works involving contemporary medical issues, he was also the author of books with "history of medicine" themes — such as: the development of Greek medicine and of health care in ancient Rome.

== Selected writings ==
- Darstellung des auf dem Gebiete der öffentlichen Gesundheitspflege bis jetzt Geleisteten, (1878)
- Die öffentliche Gesundheitspflege im alten Rom (1880), -- Health care in ancient Rome.
- Handbuch der privaten und öffentlichen Hygiene des Kindes (1881) -- Handbook of private and public hygiene involving children.
- Handbuch der Hygiene. Vienna and Leipzig, (1889).
- Hygienische Topographie der Stadt Rostock. Rostock, (1889). -- Hygienic topography of the city of Rostock.
