= Oliver Grundmann =

German politician

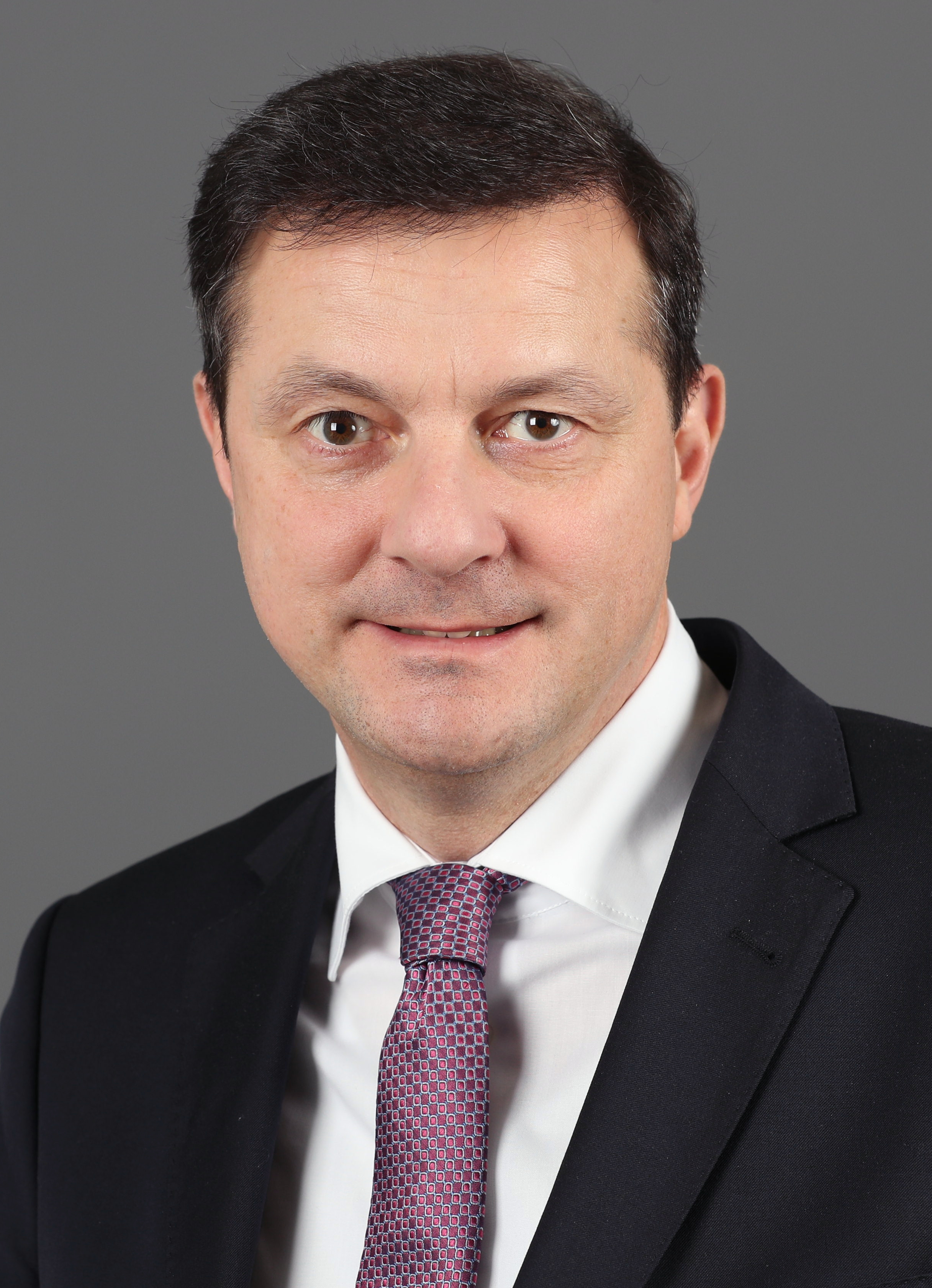
- Grundmann in 2020

Member of the Bundestag; for Stade I – Rotenburg II
- In office 22 October 2013 – 25 March 2025
- Preceded by: Hans-Werner Kammer
- Succeeded by: Vanessa-Kim Zobel

Personal details
- Born: Oliver Klaus Grundmann; 21 August 1971 (age 55) Stade, West Germany
- Party: Christian Democratic Union
- Children: 3
- Education: University of Hamburg

Oliver Grundmann (born 21 August 1971) is a German lawyer and politician of the Christian Democratic Union (CDU) who served as a member of the Bundestag from the state of Lower Saxony from 2013 to 2025.

== Political career ==
Grundmann became a member of the Bundestag after the 2013 German federal election, representing the Stade I – Rotenburg II district. In parliament, he was a member of the Committee on the Environment, Nature Conservation and Nuclear Safety.

In April 2024, Grundmann announced that he would not stand in the 2025 federal elections but instead resign from active politics by the end of the parliamentary term.
