= Horst Eylmann =

German politician

Member of the Bundestag
- In office 29 March 1983 – 26 October 1998
- Preceded by: Wolfgang Schwenk
- Succeeded by: Margrit Wetzel
- Constituency: Stade (1983–1987); Stade – Rotenburg I (1987–1998)

Personal details
- Born: 1 December 1933 Osten, Germany
- Died: 13 February 2014 (aged 80) Stade, Germany
- Party: Christian Democratic Union
- Children: 1
- Education: Athenaeum Stade

Horst Eylmann (1 December 1933 – 13 February 2014) was a German politician of the Christian Democratic Union (CDU) and former member of the German Bundestag.

== Political career ==
From 1983 to 1998, he was a member of the German Bundestag, where he was first Deputy Chairman of the Committee on Electoral Examination, Immunity and Rules of Procedure from 1990 to 1992 and Chairman of the Committee of Inquiry into Commercial Coordination and Alexander Schalck-Golodkowski from 1991 to 1992. He was then Chairman of the Committee on Legal Affairs from 1992 to 1998.
