= Eike Holsten =

German politician (born 1983)

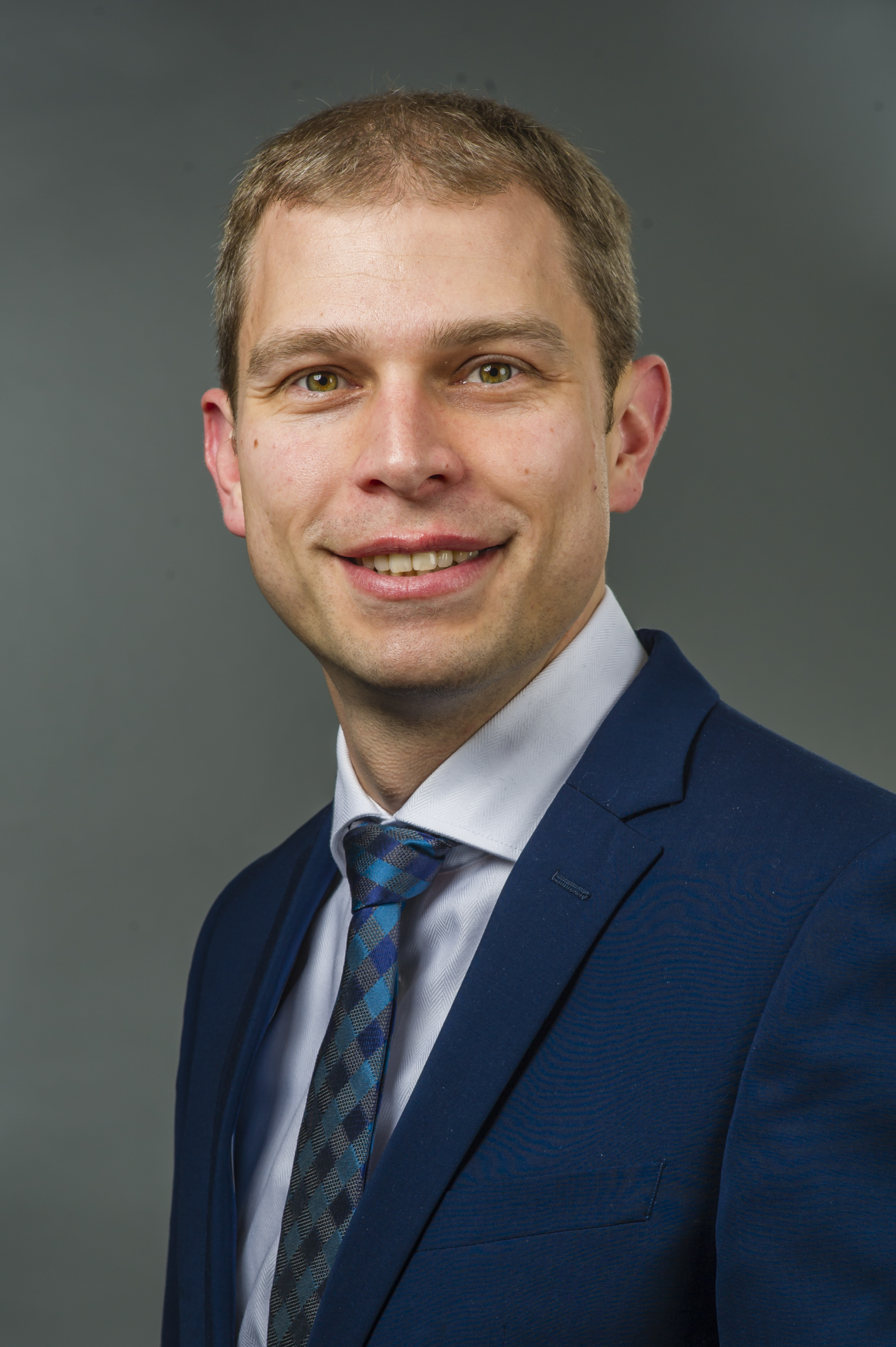
- Holsten in 2018

Member of the Landtag of Lower Saxony
- Incumbent
- Assumed office 14 November 2017
- Preceded by: Mechthild Ross-Luttmann
- Constituency: Rotenburg

Personal details
- Born: 3 May 1983 (age 42) Zeven
- Party: Christian Democratic Union (since 2000)

Eike Hendrik Holsten (born 3 May 1983 in Zeven) is a German politician serving as a member of the Landtag of Lower Saxony since 2017. He has served as chairman of the Christian Democratic Employees' Association in Lower Saxony since 2021.
