= Sauensiek =

- Municipality
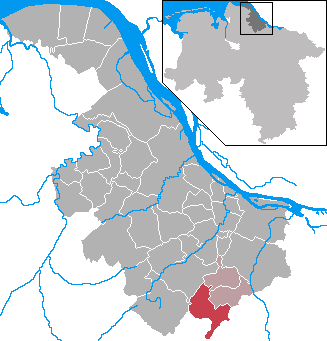
- Location of Sauensiek within Stade district
- Interactive map of Sauensiek
- Location within Germany Location within Lower Saxony
- Coordinates: 53°23′N 9°36′E
- Country: Germany
- State: Lower Saxony
- District: Stade
- Municipal assoc.: Apensen
- Subdivisions: 3

Government
  - Mayor: Rolf Suhr (CDU)

Area
  - Total: 31.37 km^{2} (12.11 sq mi)
- Elevation: 36 m (118 ft)

Population (2025-12-31)
  - Total: 2,472
  - Density: 78.80/km^{2} (204.1/sq mi)
- Time zone: UTC+01:00 (CET)
  - Summer (DST): UTC+02:00 (CEST)
- Postal codes: 21644
- Dialling codes: 04169
- Vehicle registration: STD
- Website: www.sauensiek.de

Sauensiek is a municipality in the district of Stade, Lower Saxony, Germany.

== Location ==
The Litberg, the highest point in the district of Stade, lies within the municipality of Sauensiek. It has a height of 65 metres above sea level and has been designated as a protected area.

== History ==
Sauensiek belonged - as to its government - to the Prince-Archbishopric of Bremen, established in 1180. In religious respect, however, Sauensiek formed part of the Roman Catholic Diocese of Verden until after 1566 its incumbent bishops lost papal recognition, except of a last Catholic bishop from 1630 to 1631, respectively. In 1648 the Prince-Archbishopric was transformed into the Duchy of Bremen, which was first ruled in personal union by the Swedish Crown - interrupted by a Danish occupation (1712–1715) - and from 1715 on by the Hanoverian Crown. The Kingdom of Hanover incorporated the Duchy in a real union and the Ducal territory became part of the new Stade Region, established in 1823.
