= Christian-Friedrich Vahl =

German cardiac surgeon

Christian-Friedrich Vahl (born 1955 in Zeven) is a German cardiac surgeon. He is director of the Clinic for Heart, Thorax and Vascular surgery at the University of Mainz.

== Biography ==
Vahl studied medicine, art history, philosophy and sociology. He absolved the study of medicine between 1975 and 1981 at the University Hospital of Göttingen and at the University Hospital of Heidelberg. He was scholar of the German National Academic Foundation. From 1979 to 81 Vahl spent an academic year abroad at the University of Madrid. 1986 he e graduated with the medical doctor degree (Dr. med). From 1981 to 84 he made a scientific basic education at the University of Hamburg followed ba trainings at the Deutsches Herzzentrum München and at the Augsburg Hospital. Then he took part in the project "quality assurance in the cardiac surgery". In 1988 he changed to the University of Heidelberg where was habilitated in 1995. Since 2004 Vahl is director of the Clinic for Heart-, Thorax- and Vascular Surgery at the University of Mainz. He was appointed associate professor at the University of Heidelberg in 2002.

== Honors and awards ==
- Scholar of the German National Academic Foundation
- Scholar at the Colegio Mayor "Diego de Covarrubias" at the University of Madrid
- Ernst-Derra-Price of the German Society for Thoracic and Cardiovascular Surgery
- Chair of the German Society for Thoracic and Cardiovascular Surgery (DGTHG)
- Member of the board of the German Society of Surgery
- European Academy of Sciences and Arts

== Academic memberships ==
Vahl is member in the presume of the German Society of Surgery

Further memberships:

- European Association for Cardio-Thoracic Surgery (EACTS)
- European Society for Vascular Surgery (ESVS)[

== Publications ==
Vahl is author of more than 400 scientific publications.

ResearchGate Publication list
