= Gyhum =

- Municipality
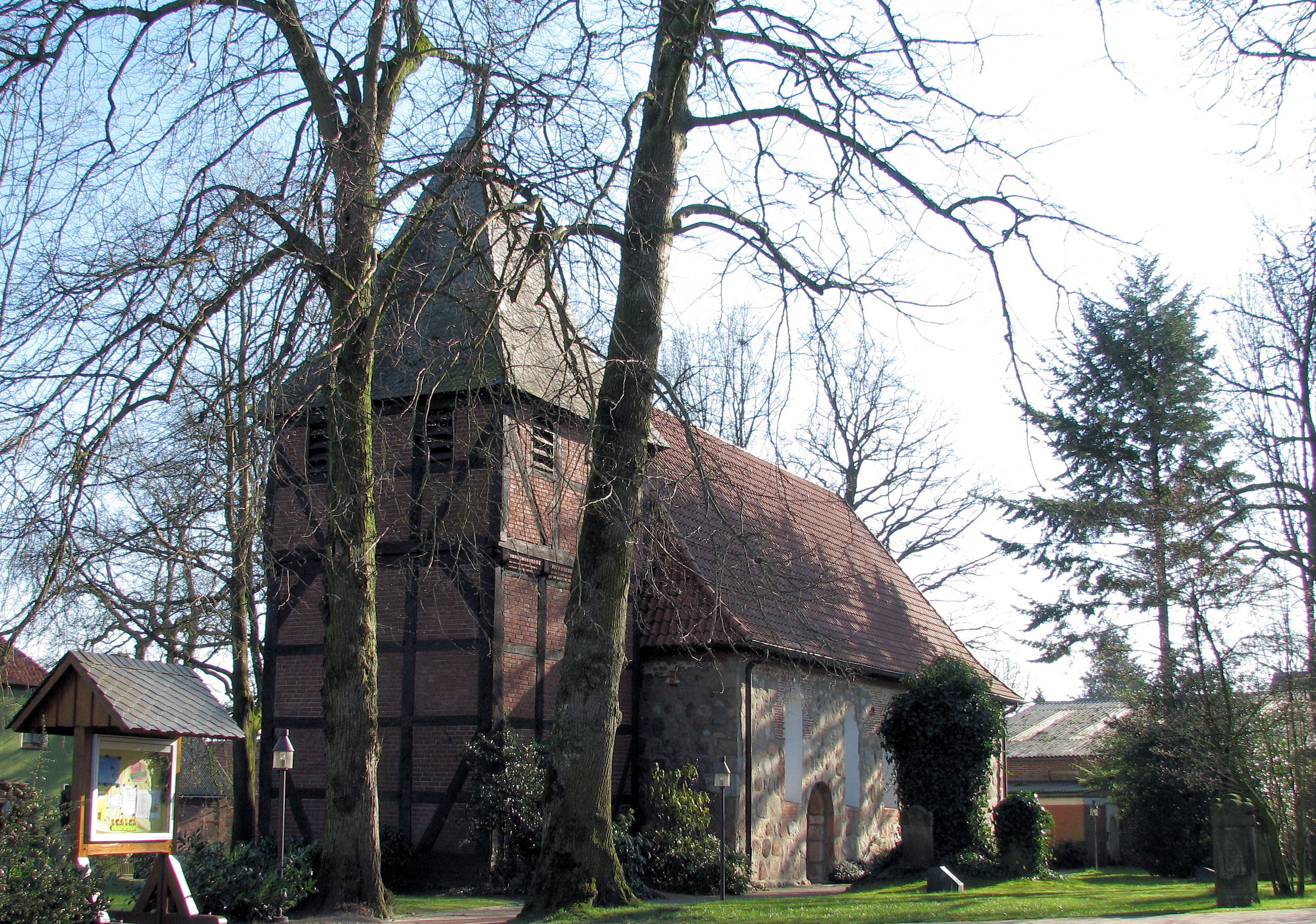
- Saint Margaret Lutheran church

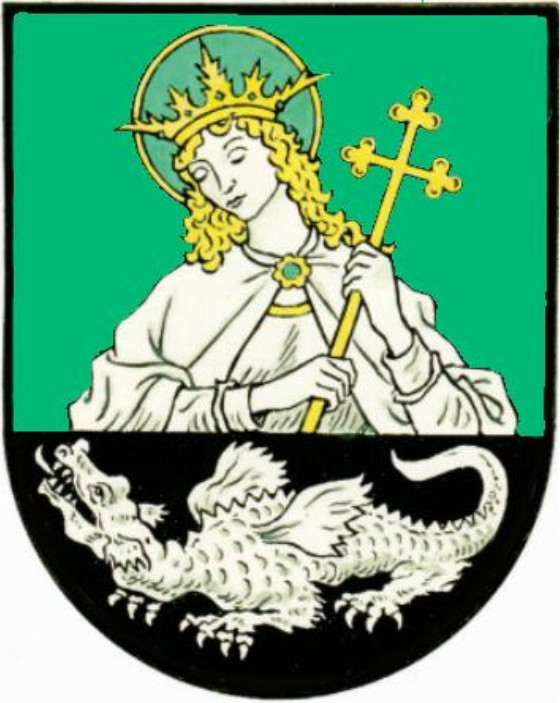
- Coat of arms

- Location of Gyhum within Rotenburg (Wümme) district
- Interactive map of Gyhum
- Location within Germany Location within Lower Saxony
- Coordinates: 53°13′00″N 09°19′08″E
- Country: Germany
- State: Lower Saxony
- District: Rotenburg (Wümme)
- Municipal assoc.: Zeven
- Subdivisions: 5

Government
  - Mayor: Friedhelm Helberg (SPD)

Area
  - Total: 48.44 km^{2} (18.70 sq mi)
- Elevation: 28 m (92 ft)

Population (2025-12-31)
  - Total: 2,455
  - Density: 50.68/km^{2} (131.3/sq mi)
- Time zone: UTC+01:00 (CET)
  - Summer (DST): UTC+02:00 (CEST)
- Postal codes: 27404
- Dialling codes: 04286
- Vehicle registration: ROW
- Website: www.gyhum.de

Gyhum is a municipality in the district of Rotenburg, in Lower Saxony, Germany.

Gyhum belonged to the Prince-Archbishopric of Bremen. In 1648 the Prince-Archbishopric was transformed into the Duchy of Bremen, which was first ruled in personal union by the Swedish and from 1715 on by the Hanoverian Crown. In 1823 the Duchy was abolished and its territory became part of the Stade Region.

== People ==
- Carl-Detlev Freiherr von Hammerstein (born 1938) in Bockel-Gyhum, German politician (CDU)
