= Sommevoire =

- Commune
- Coat of arms
- Location of Sommevoire
- Location within France Location within Grand Est
- Coordinates: 48°24′44″N 4°50′33″E
- Country: France
- Region: Grand Est
- Department: Haute-Marne
- Arrondissement: Saint-Dizier
- Canton: Wassy
- Intercommunality: CA Grand Saint-Dizier, Der et Vallées

Government
  - Mayor (2022–2026): Philippe Chassende-Baroz
- Area^{1}: 32.68 km^{2} (12.62 sq mi)
- Elevation: 145 m (476 ft)
- Highest elevation: 235 m (771 ft)
- Lowest elevation: 139 m (456 ft)
- Population (2023): 647
  - Density: 19.8/km^{2} (51.3/sq mi)
- Time zone: UTC+01:00 (CET)
  - Summer (DST): UTC+02:00 (CEST)
- INSEE/Postal code: 52479 /52220
- ^{1} French Land Register data, which excludes lakes, ponds, glaciers > 1 km^{2} (0.386 sq mi or 247 acres) and river estuaries.

Sommevoire (French pronunciation: [sɔmvwaʁ]) is a commune in the Haute-Marne department in north-eastern France.

== See also ==
- Communes of the Haute-Marne department
