= Zeven (Samtgemeinde) =

- Samtgemeinde
- Location of Zeven within Rotenburg district
- Interactive map of Zeven
- Location within Germany Location within Lower Saxony
- Country: Germany
- State: Lower Saxony
- District: Rotenburg
- Seat: Zeven
- Subdivisions: 4 municipalities

Area
  - Total: 254.31 km^{2} (98.19 sq mi)

Population (2025-12-31)
  - Total: 23,308
  - Density: 91.652/km^{2} (237.38/sq mi)
- Time zone: UTC+01:00 (CET)
  - Summer (DST): UTC+02:00 (CEST)
- Website: www.zeven.de

Zeven is a Samtgemeinde ("collective municipality") in the district of Rotenburg, in Lower Saxony, Germany. Its seat is in the town Zeven.

The Samtgemeinde Zeven consists of the following municipalities:

1. Elsdorf
2. Gyhum
3. Heeslingen
4. Zeven
