= Apensen =

- Municipality
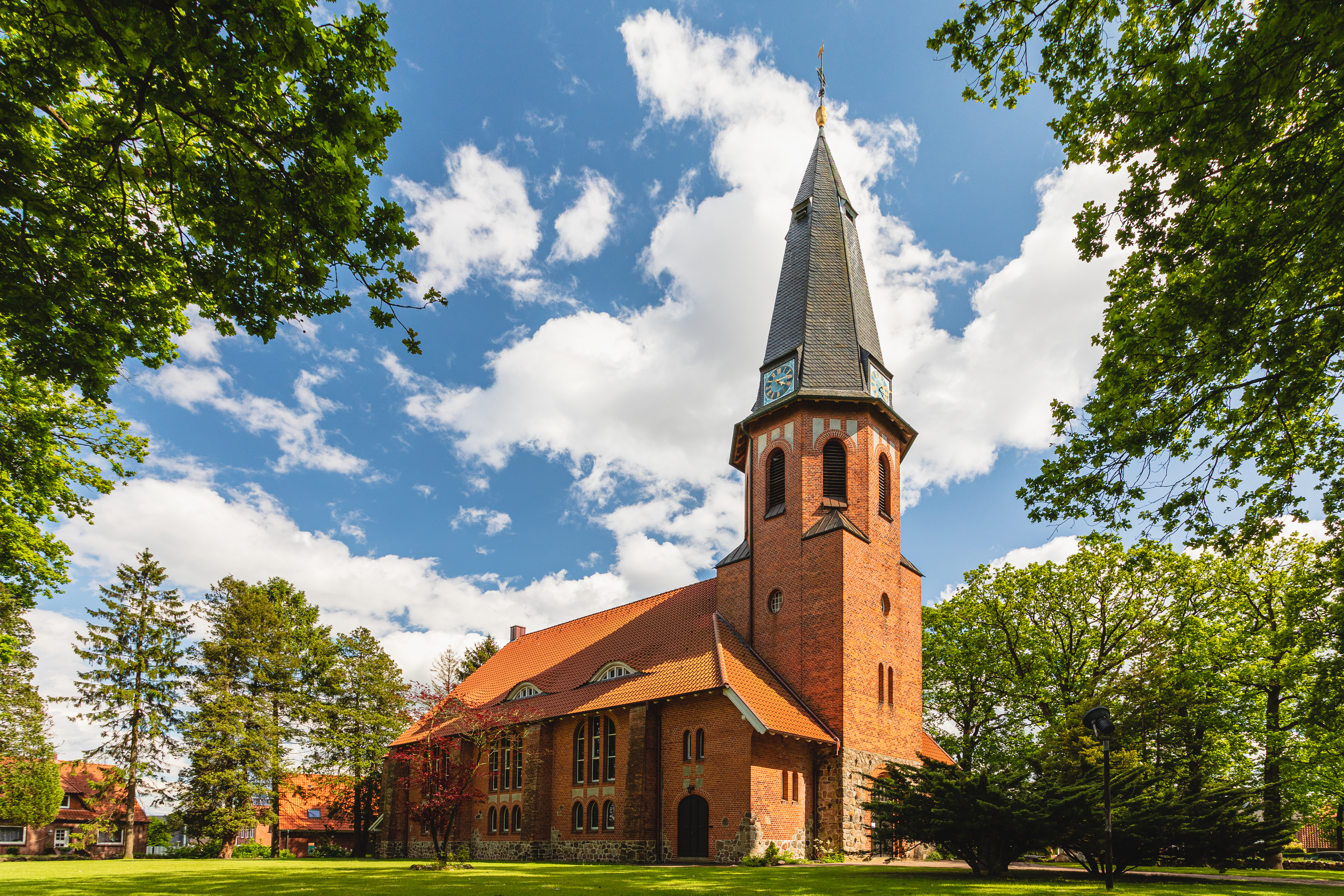
- Lutheran church in Apensen

- Coat of arms

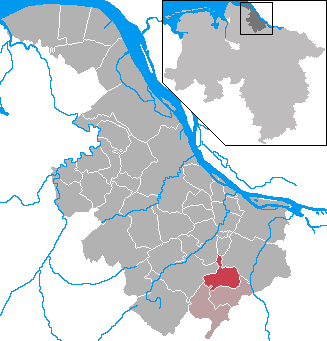
- Location of Apensen within Stade district
- Interactive map of Apensen
- Location within Germany Location within Lower Saxony
- Coordinates: 53°26′09″N 09°36′56″E
- Country: Germany
- State: Lower Saxony
- District: Stade
- Municipal assoc.: Apensen
- Subdivisions: 2

Government
  - Mayor: Frank Buchholz (FW)

Area
  - Total: 20.74 km^{2} (8.01 sq mi)
- Elevation: 39 m (128 ft)

Population (2025-12-31)
  - Total: 4,434
  - Density: 213.8/km^{2} (553.7/sq mi)
- Time zone: UTC+01:00 (CET)
  - Summer (DST): UTC+02:00 (CEST)
- Postal codes: 21641
- Dialling codes: 04167
- Vehicle registration: STD
- Website: www.apensen.de

Apensen is a municipality southwest of Hamburg (Germany). Apensen has a population of about 3,000, the area of 20.74 km^{2} and belongs to the district Stade, Lower Saxony.

It belonged to the Prince-Archbishopric of Bremen. In 1648, the Prince-Archbishopric was transformed into the Duchy of Bremen, initially ruled in personal union by Sweden, and from 1715 onward by the Hanoverian Crown. In 1823, the Duchy was abolished and its territory became part of the Stade Region.

Apensen is also the seat of the Samtgemeinde ("collective municipality") Apensen.

== Twin towns ==
Apensen is twinned with

- Kolbuszowa in Poland
