= Apensen (Samtgemeinde) =

- Samtgemeinde
- Coat of arms

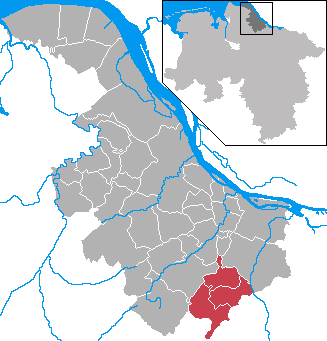
- Location of Apensen within Stade district
- Interactive map of Apensen
- Location within Germany Location within Lower Saxony
- Coordinates: 53°26′N 09°37′E
- Country: Germany
- State: Lower Saxony
- District: Stade
- Subdivisions: 3 municipalities

Government
  - Mayor (2019–24): Petra Beckmann-Frelock

Area
  - Total: 74.01 km^{2} (28.58 sq mi)
- Elevation: 45 m (148 ft)

Population (2025-12-31)
  - Total: 9,661
  - Density: 130.5/km^{2} (338.1/sq mi)
- Time zone: UTC+01:00 (CET)
  - Summer (DST): UTC+02:00 (CEST)
- Postal codes: 21641
- Dialling codes: 04167
- Vehicle registration: STD
- Website: www.apensen.de

Apensen is a Samtgemeinde ("collective municipality") in the district of Stade, in Lower Saxony, Germany. Its seat is in the village Apensen.

The Samtgemeinde Apensen consists of the following municipalities:

- Apensen
- Beckdorf
- Sauensiek
