= Heeslingen =

- Municipality
- Coat of arms

- Location of Heeslingen within Rotenburg (Wümme) district
- Interactive map of Heeslingen
- Location within Germany Location within Lower Saxony
- Coordinates: 53°19′N 09°20′E
- Country: Germany
- State: Lower Saxony
- District: Rotenburg (Wümme)
- Municipal assoc.: Zeven
- Subdivisions: 9

Government
  - Mayor: Gerhard Holsten (CDU)

Area
  - Total: 82.46 km^{2} (31.84 sq mi)
- Elevation: 19 m (62 ft)

Population (2025-12-31)
  - Total: 4,915
  - Density: 59.60/km^{2} (154.4/sq mi)
- Time zone: UTC+01:00 (CET)
  - Summer (DST): UTC+02:00 (CEST)
- Postal codes: 27404
- Dialling codes: 04281 (auch 04287)
- Vehicle registration: ROW
- Website: www.heeslingen.de

Heeslingen (German pronunciation: [ˈheːslɪŋən]) is a municipality in the district of Rotenburg, in Lower Saxony, Germany. It has 4788 inhabitants.

Heeslingen belonged to the Prince-Archbishopric of Bremen. In 1648 the Prince-Archbishopric was transformed into the Duchy of Bremen, which was first ruled in personal union by the Swedish and from 1715 on by the Hanoverian Crown. In 1823 the Duchy was abolished and its territory became part of the Stade Region.
