= Sottrum =

- Municipality
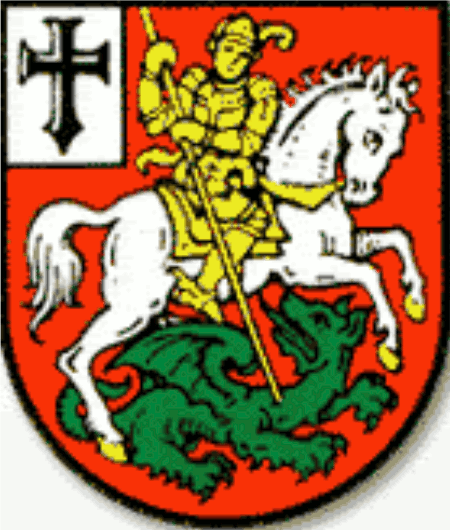
- Coat of arms

- Location of Sottrum within Rotenburg (Wümme) district
- Interactive map of Sottrum
- Location within Germany Location within Lower Saxony
- Coordinates: 53°7′N 9°13′E
- Country: Germany
- State: Lower Saxony
- District: Rotenburg (Wümme)
- Municipal assoc.: Sottrum
- Subdivisions: 3

Government
  - Mayor: Hans-Jürgen Krahn (CDU)

Area
  - Total: 28.58 km^{2} (11.03 sq mi)
- Elevation: 20 m (66 ft)

Population (2025-12-31)
  - Total: 6,435
  - Density: 225.2/km^{2} (583.2/sq mi)
- Time zone: UTC+01:00 (CET)
  - Summer (DST): UTC+02:00 (CEST)
- Postal codes: 27367
- Dialling codes: 04264
- Vehicle registration: ROW
- Website: www.sottrum.de

Sottrum is a municipality in the district of Rotenburg, in Lower Saxony, Germany. It is situated approximately 11 km west of Rotenburg, and 30 km east of Bremen.

Sottrum belonged to the Prince-Bishopric of Verden, established in 1180. In 1648 the Prince-Bishopric was transformed into the Principality of Verden, which was first ruled in personal union by the Swedish Crown - interrupted by a Danish occupation (1712–1715) - and from 1715 on by the Hanoverian Crown. The Kingdom of Hanover incorporated the Principality in a real union and the Princely territory, including Sottrum, became part of the new Stade Region, established in 1823.

Sottrum is also the seat of the Samtgemeinde ("collective municipality") Sottrum.
