= Recklinghausen II =

Federal electoral district of Germany

Coordinates: 51°41′42″N 7°11′31″E

121 Recklinghausen II
- Electoral district for the Bundestag
- Recklinghausen II in 2025
- State: North Rhine-Westphalia
- Population: 249,800 (2019)
- Electorate: 186,413 (2021)
- Major settlements: Marl; Herten; Haltern am See
- Area: 388.9 km^{2}

Current electoral district
- Created: 1949
- Party: CDU
- Member: Lars Ehm
- Elected: 2025

Recklinghausen II is an electoral constituency (German: Wahlkreis) represented in the Bundestag. It elects one member via first-past-the-post voting. Under the current constituency numbering system, it is designated as constituency 121. It is located in the Ruhr region of North Rhine-Westphalia, comprising the northern and eastern part of the Recklinghausen district.

Recklinghausen II was created for the inaugural 1949 federal election. From 2021 to 2025, it was represented by Brian Nickholz of the Social Democratic Party (SPD). Since 2025 it has been represented by Lars Ehm of the CDU.

== Geography ==
Recklinghausen II is located in the Ruhr region of North Rhine-Westphalia. As of the 2021 federal election, it comprises the municipalities of Datteln, Haltern am See, Herten, Marl, and Oer-Erkenschwick from the Recklinghausen district.

== History ==
Recklinghausen II was created in 1949, then known as Recklinghausen-Land. From 1980 through 1987, it was named Recklinghausen II. From 1990 through 1998, it was named Recklinghausen II – Borken I. It acquired its current name in the 2002 election. In the 1949 election, it was North Rhine-Westphalia constituency 41 in the numbering system. From 1953 through 1961, it was number 100. From 1965 through 1976, it was number 99. From 1980 through 1998, it was number 92. From 2002 through 2009, it was number 123. In the 2013 through 2021 elections, it was number 122. From the 2025 election, it has been number 121.

Originally, the constituency was coterminous with the Recklinghausen district. From 1965 through 1976, it comprised the municipalities of Dorsten, Herten, Kirchhellen, Marl, and Westerholt from the Recklinghausen district. From 1980 through 1987, it comprised the municipalities of Datteln, Dorsten, Haltern am See, Marl, and Oer-Erkenschwick. In the 1990 and 1994 elections, it acquired the municipalities of Heiden and Reken from the Borken district. In the 1998 election, it also acquired Raesfeld from the Borken district. It acquired its current borders in the 2002 election.

Election	No.	Name	Borders
1949	41	Recklinghausen-Land	Recklinghausen district
1953	100	Recklinghausen-Land	Recklinghausen district
1957	100	Recklinghausen-Land	Recklinghausen district
1961	100	Recklinghausen-Land	Recklinghausen district
1965	99	Recklinghausen-Land	Recklinghausen city; Recklinghausen district (only Dorsten, Herten, Kirchhellen, Marl, and Westerholt municipalities)
1969	99	Recklinghausen-Land	Recklinghausen city; Recklinghausen district (only Dorsten, Herten, Kirchhellen, Marl, and Westerholt municipalities)
1972	99	Recklinghausen-Land	Recklinghausen city; Recklinghausen district (only Dorsten, Herten, Kirchhellen, Marl, and Westerholt municipalities)
1976	99	Recklinghausen-Land	Recklinghausen city; Recklinghausen district (only Dorsten, Herten, Kirchhellen, Marl, and Westerholt municipalities)
1980	92	Recklinghausen II	Recklinghausen district (only Datteln, Dorsten, Haltern am See, Marl, and Oer-Erkenschwick municipalities)
1983	92	Recklinghausen II	Recklinghausen district (only Datteln, Dorsten, Haltern am See, Marl, and Oer-Erkenschwick municipalities)
1987	92	Recklinghausen II	Recklinghausen district (only Datteln, Dorsten, Haltern am See, Marl, and Oer-Erkenschwick municipalities)
1990	92	Recklinghausen II – Borken I	Recklinghausen district (only Datteln, Dorsten, Haltern am See, Marl, and Oer-Erkenschwick municipalities); Borken district (only Heiden and Reken municipalities)
1994	92	Recklinghausen II – Borken I	Recklinghausen district (only Datteln, Dorsten, Haltern am See, Marl, and Oer-Erkenschwick municipalities); Borken district (only Heiden and Reken municipalities)
1998	92	Recklinghausen II – Borken I	Recklinghausen district (only Datteln, Dorsten, Haltern am See, Marl, and Oer-Erkenschwick municipalities); Borken district (only Heiden, Raesfeld, and Reken municipalities)
2002	123	Recklinghausen II	Recklinghausen district (only Datteln, Haltern am See, Herten, Marl, and Oer-Erkenschwick municipalities)
2005	123	Recklinghausen II	Recklinghausen district (only Datteln, Haltern am See, Herten, Marl, and Oer-Erkenschwick municipalities)
2009	123	Recklinghausen II	Recklinghausen district (only Datteln, Haltern am See, Herten, Marl, and Oer-Erkenschwick municipalities)
2013	122	Recklinghausen II	Recklinghausen district (only Datteln, Haltern am See, Herten, Marl, and Oer-Erkenschwick municipalities)
2017	122	Recklinghausen II	Recklinghausen district (only Datteln, Haltern am See, Herten, Marl, and Oer-Erkenschwick municipalities)
2021	122	Recklinghausen II	Recklinghausen district (only Datteln, Haltern am See, Herten, Marl, and Oer-Erkenschwick municipalities)
2025	121	Recklinghausen II	Recklinghausen district (only Datteln, Haltern am See, Herten, Marl, and Oer-Erkenschwick municipalities)

== Members ==
The constituency had been held continuously by the Social Democratic Party (SPD) since 1965 until 2025. It was first represented by Anton Hoppe of the Christian Democratic Union (CDU) from 1949 to 1953, followed by fellow CDU member Friedrich Wilhelm Willeke from 1953 to 1965. Günther Eckerland of the SPD was elected in 1965 and served until 1976, when he was succeeded by Ulrich Steger. He was in turn succeeded by Horst Niggemeier, who served from 1987 to 1994. Waltraud Lehn was representative from 1994 to 2009. Michael Groß was elected in 2009, and re-elected in 2013 and 2017. He was succeeded by Brian Nickholz in 2021. In 2025 Lars Ehm won the seat for the CDU.

Election	Member	Party	%
1949	Anton Hoppe	CDU	38.1
1953	Friedrich Wilhelm Willeke	CDU	54.3
1957	Friedrich Wilhelm Willeke	CDU	55.7
1961	Friedrich Wilhelm Willeke	CDU	48.8
1965	Günther Eckerland	SPD	47.1
1969	Günther Eckerland	SPD	51.2
1972	Günther Eckerland	SPD	58.3
1976	Ulrich Steger	SPD	53.5
1980	Ulrich Steger	SPD	54.4
1983	Ulrich Steger	SPD	50.6
1987	Horst Niggemeier	SPD	50.6
1990	Horst Niggemeier	SPD	47.6
1994	Waltraud Lehn	SPD	48.8
1998	Waltraud Lehn	SPD	54.1
2002	Waltraud Lehn	SPD	56.6
2005	Waltraud Lehn	SPD	55.0
2009	Michael Groß	SPD	42.6
2013	Michael Groß	SPD	45.7
2017	Michael Groß	SPD	41.1
2021	Brian Nickholz	SPD	37.4
2025	Lars Ehm	CDU	31.6

== Election results ==
=== 2025 election ===
Federal election (2025): Recklinghausen II
Notes:	Blue background denotes the winner of the electorate vote. Pink background denotes a candidate elected from their party list. Yellow background denotes an electorate win by a list member, or other incumbent. A ✓ or ✗ denotes status of any incumbent, win or lose respectively.						
Party	Candidate	Votes	%	±%	Party votes	%	±%
CDU	Lars Ehm	46,217	31.6	▲3.5	42,173	28.8	▲4.2
SPD	✗ Brian Nickholz	42,454	29.0	▼8.4	34,273	23.4	▼12.1
AfD	Carsten Hempel	30,367	20.8	▲11.2	30,724	21.0	▲11.8
Greens	Robin Conrad	10,574	7.2	▼3.6	12,821	8.7	▼2.7
Left	Sandra Bücken-Kramps	8,501	5.8	▲3.0	9,721	6.6	▲3.6
BSW					5,908	4.0	
FDP	Tom-Jonas Roehl	3,419	2.3	▼5.9	5,171	3.5	▼6.4
Tierschutzpartei					2,277	1.6	▼0.2
FW	Martin Mersmann	1,891	1.3		790	0.5	▲0.1
Independent	Julia Bachmann	1,732	1.2				
PARTEI				▼2.6	742	0.5	▼0.6
Volt					645	0.4	▲0.3
BD	Sascha Klewitz	644	0.4		266	0.2	
MLPD	Sabine Leopold	357	0.2	▲0.1	100	0.1	0.0
Team Todenhöfer					315	0.2	▼0.6
dieBasis					261	0.2	▼0.6
Values					79	0.1	
MERA25					57	0.0	
Pirates							▼0.4
Humanists							▼0.1
ÖDP							▼0.1
Bündnis C						0.0	0.0
Gesundheitsforschung							▼0.2
SGP						0.0	0.0
Informal votes		1,306			895		
Total valid votes		146,156			146,567		
Turnout		147,462	80.8	▲6.9			
CDU gain from SPD	Majority	3,763	2.6				

=== 2021 election ===
Federal election (2021): Recklinghausen II
Notes:	Blue background denotes the winner of the electorate vote. Pink background denotes a candidate elected from their party list. Yellow background denotes an electorate win by a list member, or other incumbent. A ✓ or ✗ denotes status of any incumbent, win or lose respectively.						
Party	Candidate	Votes	%	±%	Party votes	%	±%
SPD	Brian Nickholz	51,050	37.4	▼3.7	48,563	35.5	▲3.8
CDU	Lars Ehm	38,325	28.1	▼6.4	33,610	24.6	▼4.9
Greens	Robin Conrad	14,836	10.9	▲6.2	15,627	11.4	▲6.3
AfD	Bernard Keber	13,108	9.6		12,522	9.2	▼3.3
FDP	Robert Heinze	11,283	8.3	▼1.9	13,571	9.9	▼0.7
Left	Ulrike Eifler	3,881	2.8	▼5.6	4,084	3.0	▼3.6
Tierschutzpartei					2,368	1.7	▲0.8
PARTEI	Angelina Klementz	3,509	2.6		1,555	1.1	▲0.5
Team Todenhöfer					1,094	0.8	
dieBasis					1,093	0.8	
FW					634	0.5	▲0.2
Pirates					548	0.4	▼0.1
Gesundheitsforschung					217	0.2	▲0.1
LIEBE					207	0.2	
Volt					202	0.1	
NPD					170	0.1	▼0.1
LfK					117	0.1	
V-Partei3					91	0.1	0.0
Humanists					79	0.1	0.0
MLPD	Sabine Leopold	215	0.2	▼0.9	81	0.1	▼0.1
ÖDP					72	0.1	0.0
Bündnis C					62	0.0	
du.					56	0.0	
PdF					44	0.0	
LKR					32	0.0	
DKP	Detlev Beyer-Peters	167	0.1		29	0.0	0.0
SGP					10	0.0	0.0
Informal votes		1,467			1,103		
Total valid votes		136,374			136,738		
Turnout		137,841	73.9	▼0.4			
SPD hold	Majority	12,725	9.3	▲2.7			

=== 2017 election ===
Federal election (2017): Recklinghausen II
Notes:	Blue background denotes the winner of the electorate vote. Pink background denotes a candidate elected from their party list. Yellow background denotes an electorate win by a list member, or other incumbent. A ✓ or ✗ denotes status of any incumbent, win or lose respectively.						
Party	Candidate	Votes	%	±%	Party votes	%	±%
SPD	✓ Michael Groß	56,019	41.1	▼4.5	44,224	31.7	▼8.4
CDU	Rita Stockhofe	46,982	34.5	▼2.0	41,079	29.4	▼5.2
AfD					17,387	12.5	▲8.4
FDP	Andres Schützendübel	13,903	10.2	▲8.6	14,759	10.6	▲7.0
Left	Petra Willemsen	11,502	8.4	▲2.9	9,201	6.6	▲0.3
Greens	Rita Magdalena Nowak	6,363	4.7	▼0.3	7,189	5.2	▼0.6
Tierschutzpartei					1,234	0.9	
AD-DEMOKRATEN					1,026	0.7	
PARTEI					887	0.6	▲0.3
Pirates					667	0.5	▼1.8
FW					365	0.3	▲0.1
NPD					306	0.2	▼1.1
Volksabstimmung					174	0.1	▼0.1
DM					167	0.1	
MLPD	Sabine Leopold	1,378	1.0	▲0.8	163	0.1	0.0
Gesundheitsforschung					150	0.1	
V-Partei³					123	0.1	
BGE					111	0.1	
ÖDP					104	0.1	0.0
DiB					97	0.1	
Die Humanisten					66	0.0	
DKP					25	0.0	
SGP					6	0.0	0.0
Informal votes		4,648			1,275		
Total valid votes		136,147			139,510		
Turnout		140,795	74.3	▲2.6			
SPD hold	Majority	9,037	6.6	▼2.6			

=== 2013 election ===
Federal election (2013): Recklinghausen II
Notes:	Blue background denotes the winner of the electorate vote. Pink background denotes a candidate elected from their party list. Yellow background denotes an electorate win by a list member, or other incumbent. A ✓ or ✗ denotes status of any incumbent, win or lose respectively.						
Party	Candidate	Votes	%	±%	Party votes	%	±%
SPD	✓ Michael Groß	61,748	45.7	▲3.1	54,378	40.1	▲3.3
CDU	Rita Stockhofe	49,404	36.5	▲4.8	47,082	34.7	▲5.6
Left	Bärbel Beuermann	7,529	5.6	▼4.4	8,501	6.3	▼4.3
Greens	Maaike Amalie Thomas	6,733	5.0	▼1.2	7,860	5.8	▼1.6
AfD					5,494	4.0	
Pirates	Birsen Freund	3,807	2.8		3,140	2.3	▲0.7
NPD		2,574	1.9	▲0.3	1,730	1.3	▲0.2
FDP	Mirjam Forszpaniak	2,122	1.6	▼6.1	4,813	3.5	▼7.4
Independent		1,006	0.7				
PARTEI					468	0.3	
PRO					440	0.3	
Volksabstimmung					328	0.2	▲0.1
FW					266	0.2	
REP					252	0.2	▼0.2
Nichtwahler					184	0.1	
BIG					168	0.1	
MLPD		282	0.2	▲0.1	140	0.1	0.0
ÖDP					131	0.1	0.0
Party of Reason					128	0.1	
Die Rechte					66	0.0	
RRP					65	0.0	▼0.1
PSG					61	0.0	0.0
BüSo					29	0.0	0.0
Informal votes		2,221			1,702		
Total valid votes		135,205			135,724		
Turnout		137,426	71.8	▼0.2			
SPD hold	Majority	12,344	9.2	▼1.6			

=== 2009 election ===
Federal election (2009): Recklinghausen II
Notes:	Blue background denotes the winner of the electorate vote. Pink background denotes a candidate elected from their party list. Yellow background denotes an electorate win by a list member, or other incumbent. A ✓ or ✗ denotes status of any incumbent, win or lose respectively.						
Party	Candidate	Votes	%	±%	Party votes	%	±%
SPD	Michael Groß	58,984	42.6	▼12.4	51,110	36.8	▼14.6
CDU	Astrid Timmermann-Fechter	44,021	31.8	▼0.5	40,418	29.1	▲0.4
Left	Bernd Michael Hübner	13,805	10.0	▲5.1	14,614	10.5	▲5.0
FDP	Albrecht Moslehner	10,678	7.7	▲4.7	15,219	11.0	▲4.7
Greens	Siegfried Schönfeld	8,603	6.2	▲2.5	10,299	7.4	▲2.0
Pirates					2,285	1.6	
NPD	Jacqueline Kasper	2,269	1.6	▲0.6	1,554	1.1	▲0.3
Tierschutzpartei					1,010	0.7	▲0.3
FAMILIE					694	0.5	▲0.2
REP					483	0.3	0.0
RENTNER					467	0.3	
RRP					211	0.2	
DVU					135	0.1	
Volksabstimmung					134	0.1	0.0
MLPD	Paul Schlesinger	191	0.1	0.0	96	0.1	0.0
ÖDP					83	0.1	
Centre					64	0.0	0.0
PSG					29	0.0	0.0
BüSo					28	0.0	0.0
Informal votes		1,810			1,428		
Total valid votes		138,551			138,933		
Turnout		140,361	72.0	▼6.6			
SPD hold	Majority	14,963	10.8	▼11.9			

=== 2005 election ===
Federal election (2005): Recklinghausen II
Notes:	Blue background denotes the winner of the electorate vote. Pink background denotes a candidate elected from their party list. Yellow background denotes an electorate win by a list member, or other incumbent. A ✓ or ✗ denotes status of any incumbent, win or lose respectively.						
Party	Candidate	Votes	%	±%	Party votes	%	±%
SPD	✓ Waltraud Lehn	83,905	55.0	▼1.6	78,600	51.4	▼1.6
CDU	Johann-Joachim Borchert	49,192	32.2	▲1.4	43,864	28.7	▲0.3
Left	Wilfried Kunstmann	7,397	4.8	▲3.5	8,479	5.5	▲4.5
Greens	Sabine von der Beck	5,608	3.7	▼1.0	8,303	5.4	▼1.5
FDP	Robert Heinze	4,654	3.0	▼2.7	9,589	6.3	▼1.3
NPD					1,318	0.9	▲0.6
Tierschutzpartei					704	0.5	▲0.1
Familie					514	0.3	▲0.1
REP					496	0.3	▼0.1
GRAUEN					426	0.3	▲0.1
MLPD	Paul Schlesinger	275	0.2		175	0.1	
PBC					177	0.1	
From Now on... Democracy Through Referendum					153	0.1	
Socialist Equality Party					64	0.0	
Centre					43	0.0	
BüSo					24	0.0	0.0
Informal votes		1,539			1,268		
Total valid votes		152,658			152,929		
Turnout		154,197	78.6	▼2.2			
SPD hold	Majority	34,713	22.8				
