= Marl, North Rhine-Westphalia =

Town in North Rhine-Westphalia, Germany

Marl
- Town
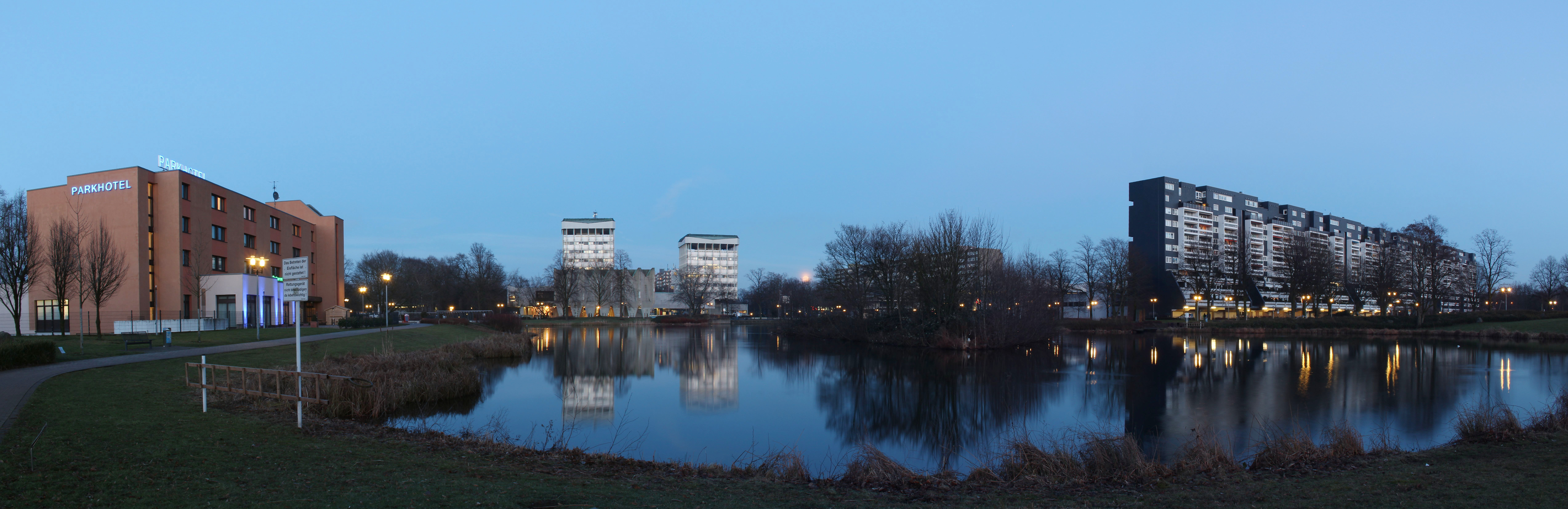
- Panoramic view of Marl City with town hall

- Flag Coat of arms

- Location of Marl within Recklinghausen district
- Interactive map of Marl
- Location within Germany Location within North Rhine-Westphalia
- Coordinates: 51°40′N 7°07′E
- Country: Germany
- State: North Rhine-Westphalia
- Admin. region: Münster
- District: Recklinghausen

Government
  - Mayor (2025–30): Thomas Terhorst (CDU)

Area
  - Total: 87.76 km^{2} (33.88 sq mi)
- Elevation: 70 m (230 ft)

Population (2025-12-31)
  - Total: 86,899
  - Density: 990.2/km^{2} (2,565/sq mi)
- Time zone: UTC+01:00 (CET)
  - Summer (DST): UTC+02:00 (CEST)
- Postal codes: 45768, 45770, 45772
- Dialling codes: 0 23 65
- Vehicle registration: RE
- Website: www.marl.de

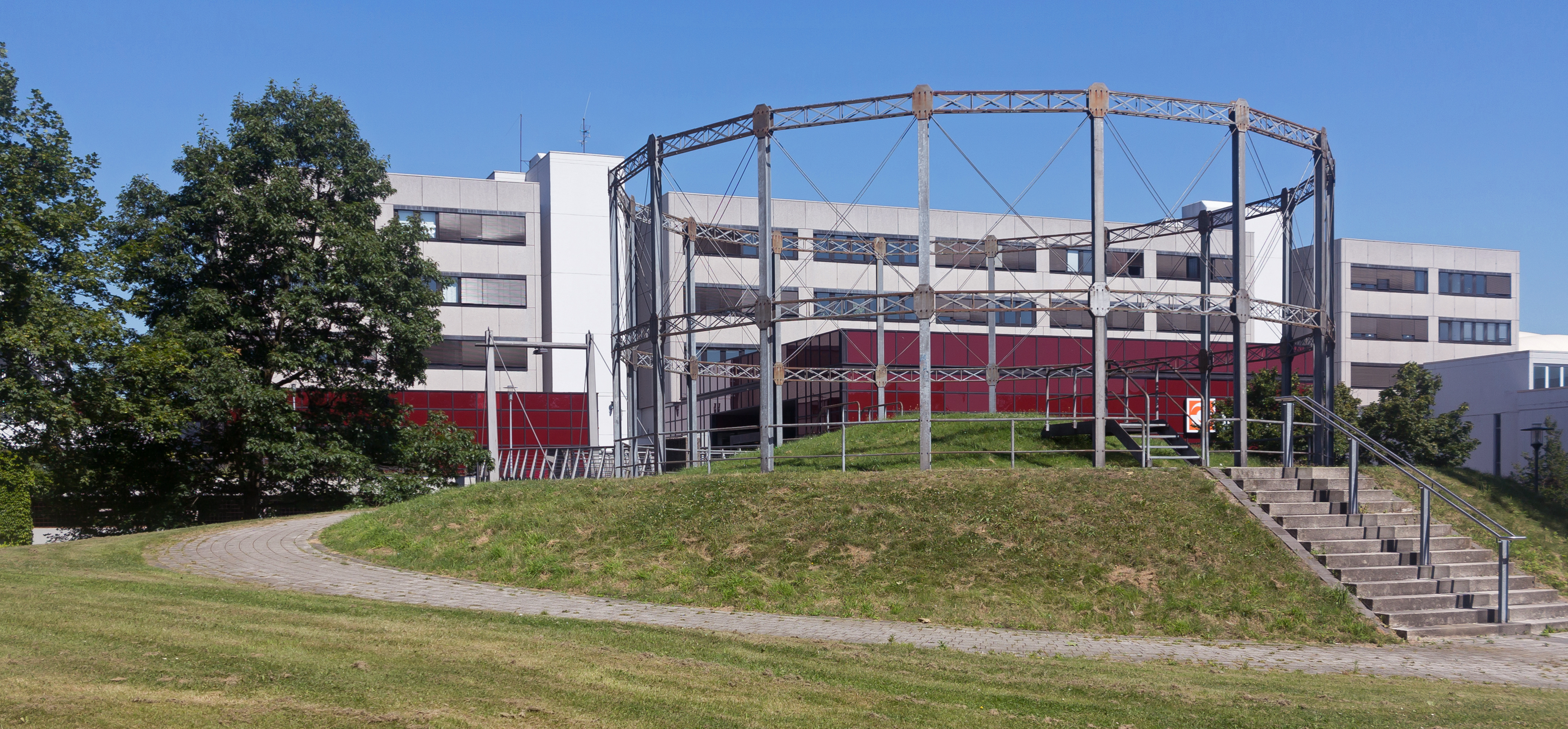
Marl, sculpture near Marler Stern

Marl (German pronunciation: [maʁl]) is a town and a municipality in the district of Recklinghausen, in North Rhine-Westphalia, Germany. It is situated near the Wesel-Datteln Canal and is about 10 km north-west of Recklinghausen. It has about 90,000 people.

== Geography ==
=== Location ===
The town adjoins in the north to the woodlands of the Haard and the natural park Hohe Mark. The town forms the smooth transition between the industrial Ruhrgebiet and the rural Münsterland. The northern town border coincides nearly completely with the course of the river Lippe. Approximately 60% of the total town area are fields, woods, watercourses, parks and other green areas.

=== Town area ===
Marl has the following urban districts:

- Stadtkern
- Alt-Marl
- Brassert
- Drewer-Nord
- Drewer-Süd
- Hamm
- Hüls-Nord
- Hüls-Süd
- Polsum
- Chemiezone
- Sinsen-Lenkerbeck

=== Neighbour towns ===
In the north Marl adjoins to Haltern am See, in the east to Oer-Erkenschwick, in the southeast to Recklinghausen, in the south to Herten, in the southwest to Gelsenkirchen and in the west to Dorsten.

=== Nature reserves ===
- Braucksenke
- Die Burg (Natura 2000-area)
- Lippeau (Natura 2000-area)
- Loemühlenbachtal

== History ==
=== Early history ===
The town area was already populated in the old and middle Stone Age, as many archeological finds in the district of Sinsen confirm. Remains of the first settlements are dated to 600 BC.

At 300 BC Celtic tribes settled in the area but were expelled by invading Germanic tribes. The Brukterer controlled thereupon the area north of the river Lippe and the Marser lived south of the Lippe. The Germanic invasion was stopped by the advance of the Romans, who built a huge fort in Haltern. Remains of a smaller Roman fort were found at the city limit between Polsum and Herten.

After the Battle of the teutoburg forest in 9AC the Romans lost most of their influence and retreated behind the Rhine river. The area was again in Germanic possession.

In 80 AC the Brukterer were expelled by rival tribes and moved to the today's area of Recklinghausen.

=== Early Middle Ages ===
The next migration movement took place in the Marl area between the 5th and 7th century, when the Saxons invaded from the northeast across the Lippe into the former Brukterer area. In the 1920th archeological excavations proofed, that the Brukterer built a circular hillfort in the district of Sinsen to defend against the Saxon attacks. Today the hillfort is only recognisable for the expert and lies in the nature reserve "Die Burg" (which means "the castle") which is named after the hillfort. Archeologists consider the hillfort as an outstanding historical monument which is worth of protection. The hillfort was used by the rural population as a protective barrier until the Late Middle Ages. Assured written regional facts about the Early Middle Ages in the 9th and 10th century were however not documented till the end of the 19th and the beginning of the 20th century.

=== Origin of the name ===
Marl was first documented in 890 in the urbarium of the benedictine abbey of Werden, which was founded in 799 during the Saxon wars. There is written, that a Dagubraht donated his possession and revenues to the abbey for his salvation. The name of Marl derives from the medieval place name "meronhlare". Linguists interpreted this name as "marshy range" or "range at a pond". The name changed over the centuries from "Marlar", "Maerl" to "Marler" and finally Marl In the urbarium are furthermore found the names of nearby settlements which later became part of the town. They were called "Threviri (Drewer)", "Vrilinctorpe(Frentrop) und "Haranni (Hamm). In addition to the Werden Abbey there were other great land owners as the Cologne and Xanten chapter, the Essen abbey and some nobles. This scattered property caused massive feuds and fighting in the Middle Ages.

==== Church history ====
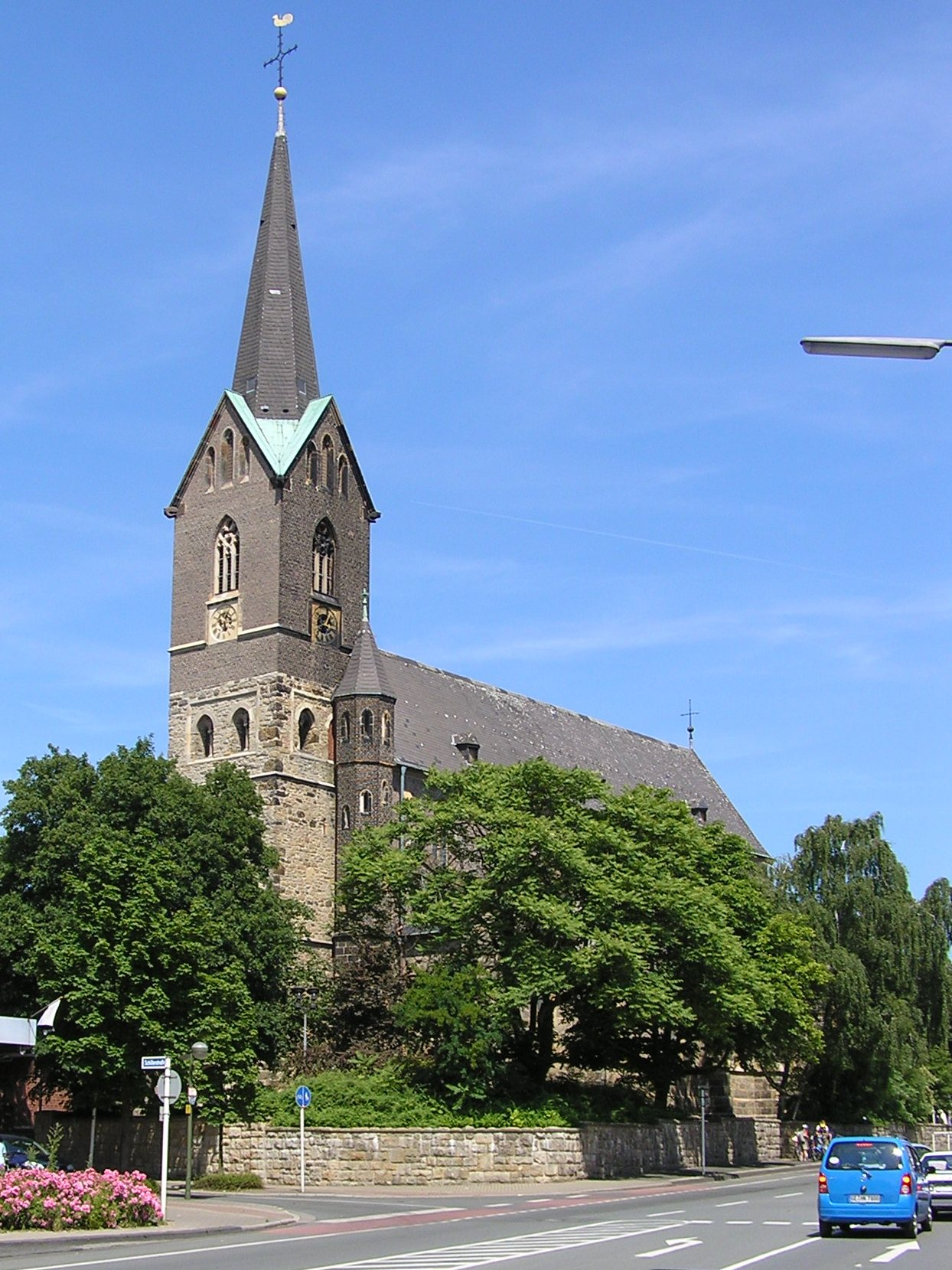
St George's Church, Marl

In the urban district of "Alt-Marl" (Old Marl) stands St George's Church, which in the 11th century belonged to the local Count Balderich of the Lower Rhine. Later he gave the church to Archbishop Heribert of Cologne. A manuscript dating from 1160 states that Archbishop Heribert donated the church to Deutz Abbey. In the 13th century it became a parish church, the appointment of its first priest being recorded in 1228. From 1419 the church was under the patronage of the local noble family of Loe. This lasted until 1830, when the patronage devolved to Baron Twickel of Lüttinghoff. Between 1856 and 1859 the church was completely restored, to plans drawn up by Emil von Manger, a builder employed by the Roman Catholic Diocese of Münster. The church's Romanesque foundation walls dating from the 12th century were retained in the restoration.

==== The Counts of Loe ====
In the year 1111 the noble family of Loe built a castle with a moat named "Strevelsloe". In 1359 it was renamed to "Haus Loe". In official manuscripts of 1373 it was named as "castrum". In 1378 the castle was signed over as an "Offenhaus" by the owner Wessel van Loe to the Archbishop of Cologne, Frederick III. of Saarwerden. "Offenhaus" means, that in the case of war, the owner can use the castle as a stronghold. So the noble family of Loe was subject to the archbishop. The family had very many properties in the region, several farms and mills, like the "Loemill", the "Sickingmill" and the Wermeling manor at the Lippe river.

Although the Loe-family had no male successor, the name lived on as in 1585 the daughter of Wolter van Loe married her cousin Baron Dietrich of Dorneburg-Loe from Eickel.

From 1705 to 1832 the castle and all properties were passed over to the noble Family of Wiedenbrück. They sold it to the baron of Twickel, who sold it on his part to Theodor Waldhausen from Essen. 30 years later it was sold to the Duke of Arenberg, who demolished the castle. Today on the former site of the castle there is a grammar school and several sports grounds. The noble Loe-family is borne in remembrance through several names like "Loe Street", "Grammar school at the Loefield" or "Loemill-Airport".

=== Middle Ages and Early Modern Age ===
Throughout the Middle Ages Marl was involved in several wars. Between 1243 and 1384 there were many military operations between the Archbishop of Cologne and the Count of Mark among other things about the possession of the neighbor town of Recklinghausen. 1388 and 1389 Marl was involved in the "Great Dortmund feud" and in the fratricidal war between Adolf IV. of Kleve-Mark and Gerhard of the Mark from Hamm. From 1442 to 1449 Marl suffered from the Soest feud in which the town of Soest defended her freedom against the Archbishop of Cologne.

At the end of the 16th century Marl had 800 inhabitants. Most of them lived in the farming community of Drewer.

In the "War of the Jülich-Cleves succession", the farming communities around Marl were plundered by the Dutch and Spanish troops who joined the war. Directly following this war, the Thirty Years' War began, where the plunderings continued. After the war, there was peace for many centuries. During the French campaign of Charles, Prince of Soubise, in the Seven Years' War in 1758 the plundering of Marl started again. After the French troops, the Prussians came but without improvement for the situation of the inhabitants.

Until 1803 the insignificant village Marl was part of the Vest Recklinghausen. Then the Duke of Arenberg owned the village. From 1810 to 1813, during the French occupation the village was renamed in "Mairie Marl" and belonged to the Grand Duchy of Berg. After the War of the Sixth Coalition Marl got under Prussian reign and was part of the district Essen until 1816 and afterwards until now to the district Recklinghausen.

In this age, Marl had only village mayors, who were elected for one year and directly responsible to the governors of the Vest Recklinghausen. The village mayors tasks were the collection of the taxes and managing the village real estates. Beside these village mayors there were two Prince-electoral representatives, the "Amtsfron"(village soccage) and the "Amtsführer"(village leader) (from 1785 both offices were combined ) whose task was to supervise the prince-electoral regulations.

From 1 April 1816 Marl was consolidated with the town of Dorsten to the "Office of mayor Dorsten"("Bürgermeisterei Dorsten") with the mayor of Dorsten as provost.

In 1837, after the territorial reform of the Prussian state, Marl got autonomous again. The village area was enlarged and the village of Altendorf-Ulfkotte was suburbanized, though marl did not get his name back but was named "Dorsten-environs"("Dorsten-Land") On 31 October 1841 the Royal Administration in Münster founded the "Administration Marl" ("Amt Marl"), an in-between of town and village. The administration area included Marl, the villages of Polsum, Hamm and Altendorf-Ulfkotte, plus the surrounding farming communities.

Agriculture has always been the main source of income in Marl. This becomes apparent in an official list from 1840. The following is recorded there: 493 horses, 1879 cattle, 857 pigs, 98 goats and 4591 sheep. Despite the muchness of sheep, the importance of sheep farming declined in later centuries.

As many farmers needed a sideline, many families weaved, mostly as wageworkers for drapers. The former village mayor Bölling reports in his chronicle:

"…has built here some factories and kudos to the damask weaving mills, which deliver precious table-linen for high-standing persons and earned great reputation. It is an elegant weaving."

In the records of 1842 the following professions are listed:

3 bakers, 1 butcher, 17 shoemakers, 17 tailors, 17 carpenters, 5 cabinetmakers, 6 coopers, 1 bricklayer, 15 blacksmiths, 6 cellarmen, 60 weavers, 42 chandlers, 12 hawkers, 2 inns, 11 taverns, 6 brewer, 2 distilleries, 6 corn dealer, 5 wood dealer...

The turning point in Marls history was 21 January 1875. On this day the "Simson well-drilling Company" found a coal deposit in the depth of 514 meter in the urban district Polsum. Additional drillings in Marl resulted in the formation coalmines.

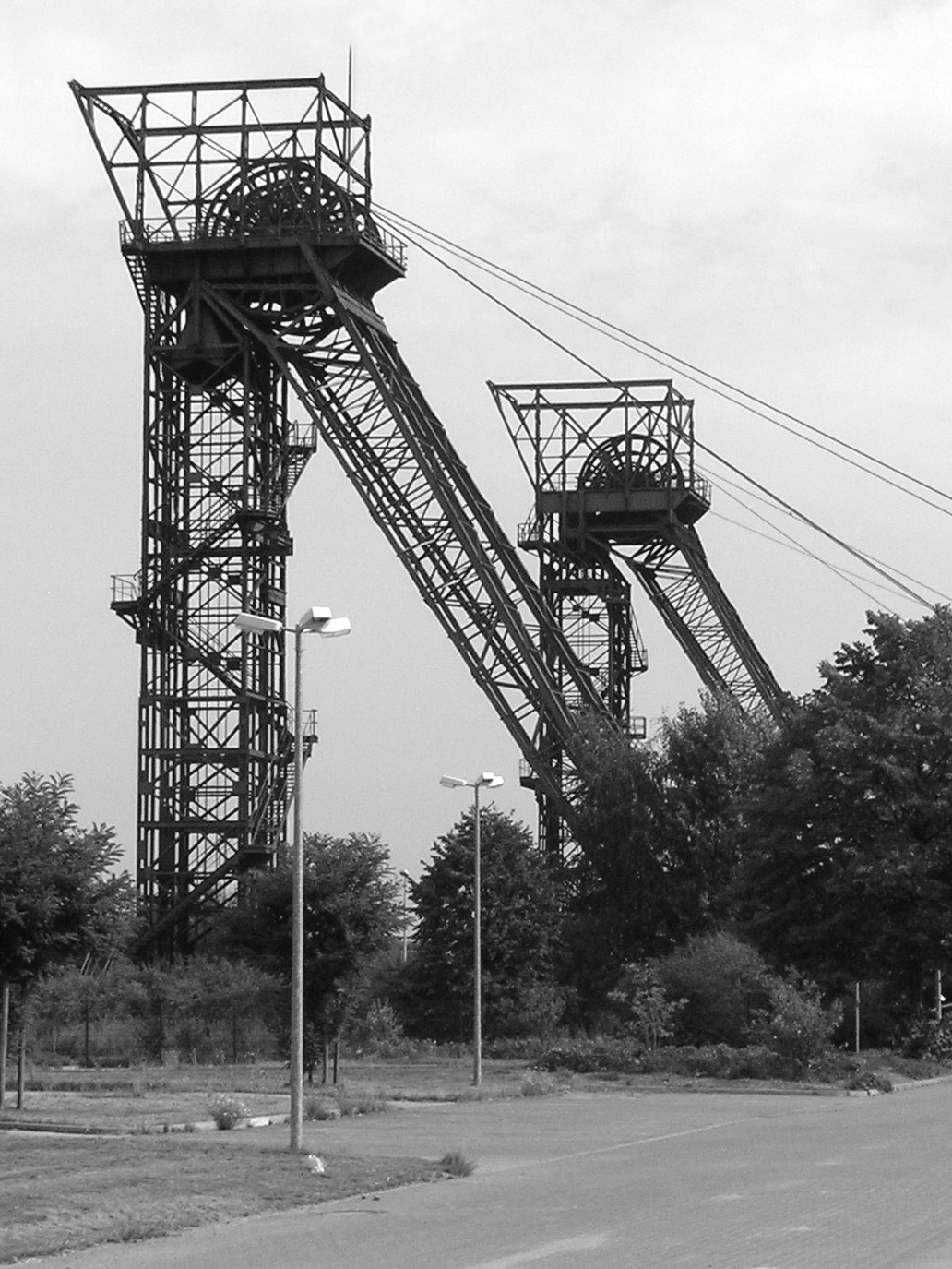
Closed Auguste Victoria mine shafts.

=== Foundation of the "Auguste Victoria coalmine" ===
August Stein und Julius Schäfer from Düsseldorf founded the coalmine "Auguste Victoria" in 1898 based in Düsseldorf and coal production was planned on the claims "Hansi 1" and "Hansi 2". On 1 May 1900 the depths began and in 1903 the head office moved to Marls urban district Hüls. At the end of 1905 coal production began on the pit "AV 1". Eponym for the mine was Augusta Victoria of Schleswig-Holstein, (1858–1921) the last German empress and wife of Emperor Wilhelm II. The coalmine was one of the highly productive mines in Germany. Nevertheless, it was closed at the end of 2015, because of the cessation of the coal production in Germany.

=== Foundation of the "Brassert coal mine" ===
In 1905 another coalmine was founded in Marl. It was named after Hermann Brassert, the "father of the common mining law of 1865". In 1910 the coal production began and in the 1950s about 5,000 people were employed "on Brassert". In 1972 the mine was closed and 2/3 of the mine area became a commercial park, the other 1/3 a recreation ground. Some mining buildings have been saved. The old entrance buildings serve as an art studio and as bureau of the bicycle society. The urban district around the mine was named "Brassert" as the mine built houses around the pit for their workers.

=== 20th century ===
The Spartacist Uprising, linked with the Kapp Putsch also had influence on Marl. On 1 April 1920 the so-called "Red Ruhr Army" occupied Marl and started a gunfight with the Reichswehr at the Lippe river-crossing near Hamm-Bossendorf. 15 uninvolved channel diggers were also killed.

On 15 January 1923 Marl was occupied by French and Belgian troops.

On 1 April 1926 Marl grew bigger as the surrounding villages of Sinsen, Hüls, Lenkerbeck and Löntrop were suburbanized.

In 1931 the "Handbook of all towns and villages in the Rhine province and Westpfalia" states, that Marl had 34102 inhabitants ( 19598 Roman Catholic, 12105 Protestants, 30 Jewish and 2309 other confessions) There was no mayor at that time. The city council consisted of 18 people. 10 Centre Party (Germany), 2 Social Democratic Party of Germany, 1 Reich Party of the German Middle Class, 4 Communist Party of Germany, 1 independent . The total town area was 11.076 hectare, thereof 415 hectare build-up area, 3652 hectare farmland and 5574 hectare forests and meadows.

On 20 April 1936 Marl received its town charter by the headpresident of the province of Westphalia, Ferdinand, Baron of Lüninck.

Marl has grown very fast because of the coal mines and the chemical industry.

=== Foundation of the "Chemical Park" ===
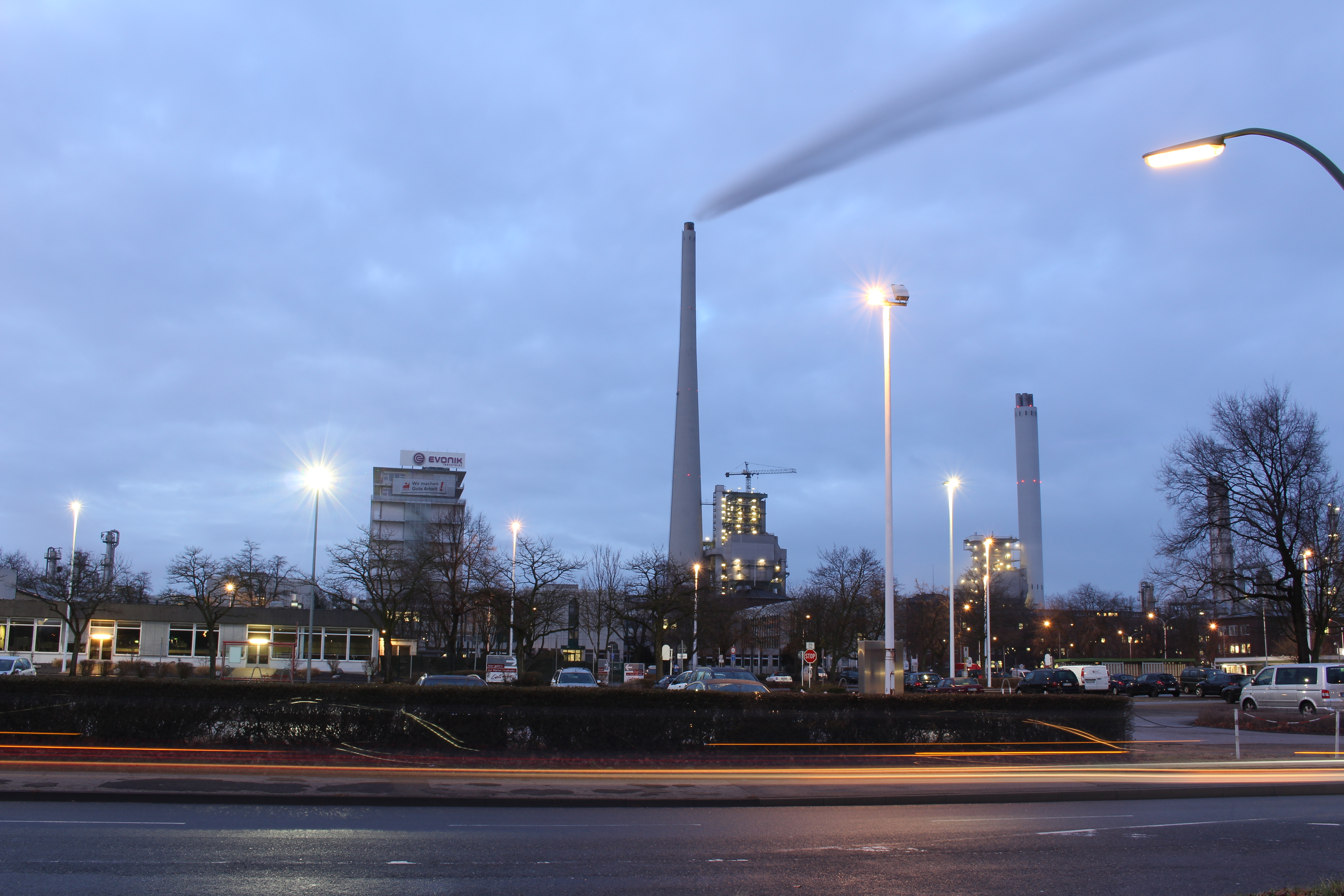
The south view of Chemiepark Marl

Marl Chemical Park (German: Chemiepark Marl) goes back to the foundation of the Chemische Werke Hüls (English: Hüls Chemical Works) in 1938. At the time of the Third Reich the factories produced synthetic rubber (called "Buna") for tires. Therefore, a lot of forced labourers were used. After the Second World War the factories produced plastics, resources for cleaning agents and again "Buna". In 1985 the company was merged with the Degussa AG and later in 2007 with the Evonik industries and is now called "Chemical Park Marl". The infrastructure of the park was taken over by the "infracor" company.

=== Second World War ===
The Kristallnacht 1938 led to the persecution of the Jewish inhabitants, who have resided in Marl since 1910. They worked mostly in the clothing trade or sold furniture. Several people were injured, their shops burned down and all 29 Jewish inhabitants had to leave the town. Most of them were deported to Riga and murdered. These incidents were documented by the German artist Gunter Demnig and his project "Stolpersteine" (stumbling blocks).

Between 1939 and 1945 many foreign forced workers worked in companies and private households. Throughout the war especially the "Buna" factories were target of several allied air raids. Although the civilian areas of the town were relatively near to the factories civilian demolition was kept to a limit. On 31 March 1945 the American 8th Armored Division occupied the town.

Hubert Brinkforth holder of the Knights Cross was born in Marl.

As the town was merged from several farming communities with the mining settlements and houses of the chemical workers it has no real centre. In the 1960s and 1970s a new centre was built in greenfield strategy as a new town hall, high-rise buildings and the shopping mall "Marler Stern" originated.

=== Train accident at the Marl-Sinsen train station ===
On 5 October 1973 there was a train accident near the Marl-Sinsen train station, in which 7 persons were killed and 44 persons injured. The express train 632 from Flensburg to Düsseldorf collided with a switch engine, which was waiting on the track and derailed. Shortly afterwards a freight train ran into the scene of accident. Both trains fell down a steep slope on the national highway 51. The cause of accident was that one of the points was set wrong.

== Population ==
From the mid-ages until the early 20th century Marl had just a few hundred inhabitants. The Industrialization led to a fast increase from about 2,000 people in 1900 to over 35,000 in 1939 and 92,000 in 1975. In 2007, the "Official Number of inhabitants" calculated by the Landesamt für Datenverarbeitung und Statistik of North Rhine Westphalia was 89,122. The following table shows the numbers of inhabitants. The value in 1600 is an estimate, afterwards the result of population counts or calculations of the Statistisches Landesamt. The specifications until 1871 show the "population in the area", from 1925 to 1987 they indicate the resident population and since then the main resident population. Before 1871 the means of measurement were without uniformity.

Historical population

Year	Pop.	±% p.a.
1600	800	—
1875	1,883	+0.31%
1900	2,199	+0.62%
1910	5,571	+9.74%
1919	12,130	+9.03%
1925	16,018	+4.74%
1933	31,619	+8.87%
1939	35,288	+1.85%
1946	44,043	+3.22%
1950	51,192	+3.83%
1956	64,228	+3.85%
1961	71,508	+2.17%
1965	89,964	+5.91%

Year	Pop.	±% p.a.
1970	91,926	+0.43%
1975	91,925	−0.00%
1980	89,088	−0.63%
1985	87,450	−0.37%
1990	91,467	+0.90%
1995	92,965	+0.33%
2000	93,256	+0.06%
2005	90,816	−0.53%
2010	87,557	−0.73%
2015	83,926	−0.84%
2020	84,312	+0.09%
2025	86,899	+0.61%

Source: Landesdatabank Nordrhein-Westfalen (1965-2025)

48.8% of the inhabitants are male, 51.2% female.

- 17.7% are less than 18,
- 34.3% are between 18 and 44,
- 21.9% are between 45 and 59,
- 26.1% are older than 60 years.

8.9% of the population are of foreign origin (Dec 2006), coming from about 130 different states. 52.5% are from Turkey, 7.5% from Ex-Yugoslavia, 5.6% from Poland.

== Economy ==
The "Chemical Park Marl", the mine "Auguste Victoria", the "Medienhaus Bauer", are the largest employers in Marl. The coal mine at Marl-Hüls, Zeche Auguste Victoria, was founded in 1899, and is still operating. The mass production of the Loremo was planned for 2010 in a yet-to-be-constructed car factory in the industrial complex of Dorsten/Marl, but looks now into uncertain future.

== Culture ==
Marl is the home of the Skulpturenmuseum Glaskasten (Marl Glass Box Sculpture Museum).

== Politics ==
The current mayor of Marl is Thomas Terhorst of the Christlich Demokratische Union (CDU) since 2025.

Previous municipal election was held on 13 September 2020, with a runoff held on 27 September, and the results were as follows:

Candidate	Party	First round		Second round	
Candidate	Party	Votes	%	Votes	%
Werner Arndt	Social Democratic Party	14,064	46.6	11,224	59.7
Angelika Dornebeck	Christian Democratic Union	7,890	26.1	7,566	40.3
Bernard Keber	Alternative for Germany	1,989	6.6		
Daniel Schulz	Alliance 90/The Greens	1,884	6.2		
Andres Schützendübel	Free Democratic Party	1,387	4.6		
Beate Kühnhenrich	WG The Greens Marl	1,009	3.3		
Fritz Dechert	Citizens' List We for Marl	823	2.7		
Claudia Flaisch	The Left	636	2.1		
Borsu Alinaghi	Independent Citizens' Party	609	1.7		
Valid votes		30,191	98.7	18,790	99.1
Invalid votes		410	1.3	166	0.9
Total		30,601	100.0	18,956	100.0
Electorate/voter turnout		68,184	44.9	68,143	27.8
Source: City of Marl (1st round, 2nd round)

=== City council ===
Results of the 2020 city council election.

The Marl city council governs the city alongside the Mayor. The most recent city council election was held on 13 September 2020, and the results were as follows:

Party	Votes	%	+/-	Seats	+/-
Social Democratic Party (SPD)	10,735	35.7	▼7.0	16	▼5
Christian Democratic Union (CDU)	8,456	28.2	▼0.5	12	▼2
Alliance 90/The Greens (Grüne)	2,649	8.8	▲5.4	4	▲2
Alternative for Germany (AfD)	2,382	7.9	New	4	New
WG The Greens Marl	1,675	5.6	▲1.8	2	±0
Free Democratic Party (FDP)	1,375	4.6	▲1.6	2	▲1
The Left (Die Linke)	800	2.7	▼1.3	1	▼1
Citizens' List We for Marl (WiR)	730	2.4	▼2.0	1	▼1
Independent Citizens' Party (UBP)	622	2.1	▼2.6	1	▼1
Die PARTEI	609	2.0	New	1	New
Valid votes	30,033	98.1			
Invalid votes	575	1.9			
Total	30,608	100.0		44	▼4
Electorate/voter turnout	68,184	44.9	▲1.5		
Source: City of Marl

=== Results of the local elections since 1975 ===
Jahr	SPD	CDU	UBP	WIR	Linke^{1}	WG Grüne	B90/Grüne	BUM	FDP	Piraten
1975	58,8	34,9							4,8	
1979	52,8	33,6				8,9			4,3	
1984	52,7	32,1				11,0			3,8	
1989^{2}	48,5	28,3				11,2			4,5	
1994	45,1	36,2		7,2		10,8			1,9	
1999	38,4	43,8		9,5		5,0			2,5	
2004	37,7	31,8		9,5	3,4	6,5		5,4	5,7	
2009	36,6	27,6	2,8	8,3	5,1	4,7	2,9	5,2	6,9	
2014	42,7	28,6	4,6	4,4	4,0	3,8	3,5	3,04	2,98	2,3

^{1} Linke: 2004: PDS, since 2009: Die Linke
^{2} 1989: also: REP: 7,5

=== Mayor ===
- 1936-1939: Heinrich Springies, NSDAP, from 1933 to 1936 village mayor
- 1939-1941: Paul Becker, NSDAP
- 1942–1945: Friedrich Wilhelm Willeke, till 1933 Zentrum, then NSDAP, from 1945 CDU
- 1945-1946: Paul Eichmann (independent businessman from Marl-Hüls, was installed as mayor by the American and British military government)
- 1946–1965: Rudolf-Ernst Heiland, SPD
- 1965–1974: Ernst Immel, SPD
- 1975–1984: Günther Eckerland, SPD
- 1984–1995: Lothar Hentschel, SPD
- 1995–1999: Ortlieb Fliedner, SPD
- 1999–2009: Uta Heinrich, CDU, from 2004 independent
- 2009–2025: Werner Arndt, SPD
- 2025–today: Thomas Terhorst, CDU

=== Chemiepark Marl ===
One of the largest integrated chemical production sites in Germany, the "Chemical Park Marl" is based in Marl. It was founded as the Chemische Werke Hüls GmbH in 1938.

The Hüls synthetic rubber plant was a bombing target of the Oil Campaign of World War II. The second largest producer of synthetic rubber (17% of Axis supply), the plant was 240 miles closer to Allied bomber bases than the larger synthetic rubber plant at Schkopau. On 22 June 1943, the sole Eighth Air Force operation against Nazi Germany synthetic-rubber production during the first phase of the Combined Bomber Offensive opened "a new chapter in aerial warfare" (RAF Fighter Commander Sir Trafford Leigh-Mallory) with a bombing that destroying 6,200 of 8,380 built-up acres of "the city".

== Twin towns – sister cities ==
Marl is twinned with:

- Creil, France (1975)
- Herzliya, Israel (1981)
- Bitterfeld-Wolfen, Germany (1990)
- Pendle, England, United Kingdom (1995)
- Kuşadası, Turkey (1999)
- Zalaegerszeg, Hungary (2000)
- Krosno, Poland (2015)

== Notable people ==
- Oğuzhan Aydoğan (born 1997), footballer
- Karsten Braasch (born 1967), tennis player
- Michael Groß (born 1956), politician (SPD)
- Sabine Grofmeier (born 1973), German classical clarinetist
- Heinz van Haaren (born 1940), Dutch footballer
- Anna Hepp (born 1977), filmmaker, artist and photographer
- Peter Neururer (born 1955), football manager
- Our Mirage (formed in 2017), metalcore band
- Matthias Pintscher (born 1971), composer and conductor
- Virtual Riot (born 1994), music producer
- Gertrud Schäfer (born 1944), athlete
- Sönke Wortmann (born 1959), film director
