= Anton Hoppe =

German politician (1889–1968)

Deputy Landrat, Recklinghausen District
- In office 1956–1961

Landrat, Recklinghausen District
- In office 1946–1956

Member of the Bundestag
- In office 7 September 1949 – 7 September 1953

Personal details
- Born: 12 February 1889 Mülheim am Rhein, Kingdom of Prussia, German Empire
- Died: 11 August 1968 (aged 79) Herten, North Rhine-Westphalia, West Germany
- Party: Centre Party; CDU
- Occupation: Locksmith; Trade union leader

Anton Hoppe (12 February 1889 – 11 August 1968) was a German trade unionist and politician of the Centre Party during the Weimar Republic. He was active in local and provincial politics in the Province of Westphalia until the Nazi seizure of power in 1933. After Germany's defeat in the Second World War, he became a co-founder of the Christian Democratic Union (CDU) in Westphalia and served as a member of the German Bundestag from 1949 to 1953. He was also the district administrator or deputy administrator of the Recklinghausen district between 1946 and 1961.

== Life ==
Hoppe was born in Mülheim am Rhein (today, Mülheim, a borough of Cologne), attended a Catholic Volksschule and then apprenticed as a locksmith and lathe operator. In 1914, he joined the Christian trade union movement, serving as the district leader in Recklinghausen district from 1928 to 1935 when the organization was forcibly dissolved by the Nazi Party. Hoppe was a member of the Catholic-oriented Centre Party from 1910. From 1926 to 1933, he served as an alderman and member of the city council of Herten, and on the Recklinghausen district council. He also on the provincial parliament of the Province of Westphalia from 1930 to 1933. From 1937, he worked as a treasurer for the Catholic church tax office in Herten.

After the end of the Second World War, Hoppe was among the founding members of the Christian Democratic Union in Westphalia and Recklinghausen. Hoppe was a member of the first and second appointed state parliaments of North Rhine-Westphalia between 1946 and 1950. From October 1946 to September 1964, he returned to the Recklinghausen district council. He was elected to the first Bundestag (federal parliament) in the 1949 federal election by winning the direct mandate in the constituency of Recklinghausen-Land. He left parliament in 1953. From 1946 to 1956, he served as the Landrat (district administrator) of the district of Recklinghausen, and as the deputy Landrat to March 1961. Hoppe died at Herten in August 1968.

== Sources ==
- Detailansicht des Abgeordneten Anton Hoppe in the Landtag Nordrhein Westfalen website
- Herbst, Ludolf; Jahn, Bruno (2002). Vierhaus, Rudolf (ed.). Biographisches Handbuch der Mitglieder des Deutschen Bundestages. 1949–2002 [Biographical Handbook of the Members of the German Bundestag. 1949–2002] (in German). München: De Gruyter - De Gruyter Saur. p. 1715. ISBN 978-3-11-184511-1.
