= Lars Ehm =

German politician (born 1976)

Member of the Bundestag
- Assuming office 25 March 2025
- Succeeding: Brian Nickholz
- Constituency: Recklinghausen II

Personal details
- Born: 9 April 1976 (age 50)
- Party: Christian Democratic Union

Lars Andre Ehm (born 9 April 1976) is a German politician who was elected as a member of the Bundestag in 2025. He has served as city councillor of Oer-Erkenschwick since 1999.
