= Rennbeck fire tower =

Observation tower

The Fire observation Tower Rennbeck is a 30-metre (98 ft) tall observation tower built of wood on the Rennberg near Oer in Germany. It is built in an unusual triangular cross section.

== See also ==
List of towers
