= Heiden, Germany =

Heiden
- Municipality
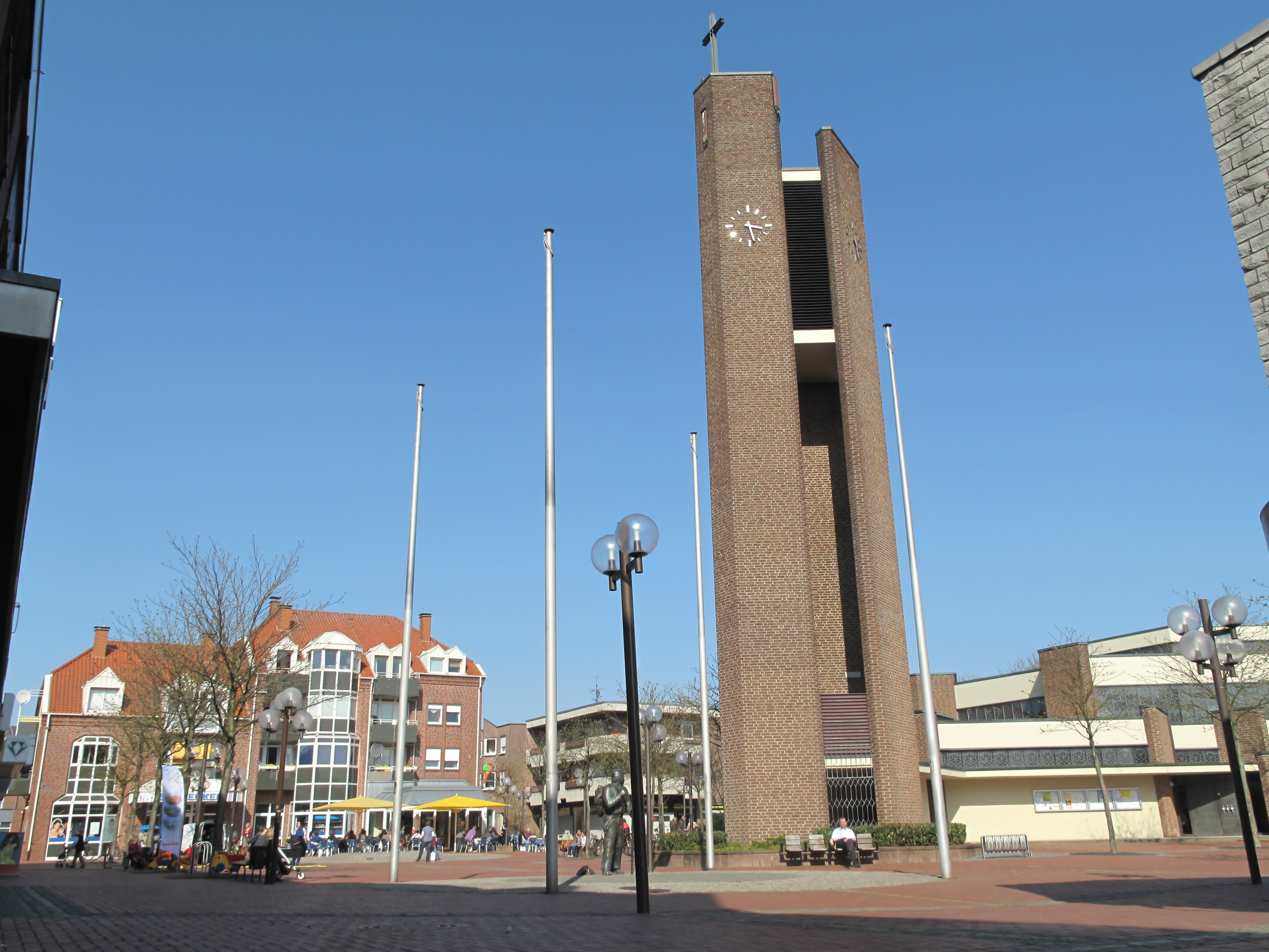
- Modern church on Heiden Townhall square

- Flag Coat of arms

- Location of Heiden within Borken district
- Interactive map of Heiden
- Location within Germany Location within North Rhine-Westphalia
- Coordinates: 51°49′33″N 06°55′59″E
- Country: Germany
- State: North Rhine-Westphalia
- Admin. region: Münster
- District: Borken

Government
  - Mayor (2020–25): Patrick Voßkamp (CDU)

Area
  - Total: 53.39 km^{2} (20.61 sq mi)
- Elevation: 79 m (259 ft)

Population (2025-12-31)
  - Total: 8,777
  - Density: 164.4/km^{2} (425.8/sq mi)
- Time zone: UTC+01:00 (CET)
  - Summer (DST): UTC+02:00 (CEST)
- Postal codes: 46359
- Dialling codes: 02867
- Vehicle registration: BOR
- Website: www.heiden.de

Heiden is a municipality in the district of Borken in the state of North Rhine-Westphalia, Germany. It is located approximately 5 km east of Borken.

Its most important symbol are the devil stones.

== Geography ==
=== Location ===
Heiden is located in the west of the Westphalian Lowland near to the changeover to the Ruhr area in the south. In the north of Heiden are The Mountains (Die Berge). Heiden is surrounded by many woods.

=== Neighbouring places ===
In the north Heiden borders the city of Borken and the city of Velen, in the east borders the municipality of Reken. The southern border of Heiden to Dorsten is also the border to the district of Recklinghausen.

=== Division ===
Officially, Heiden has no division. Nevertheless, there are hamlets outside the urban settlement of Heiden. On the one hand, there are the dispersed settlements of Leblich with its Hamlets Buschausen, Leblich and Heiden along the Railway Street in the south and on the other hand Nordick and Lammersfeld in the north.

== History ==
=== Early history ===
In one of Heidens forests (The Uhlen) you can find the devil stones (in German Teufelssteine or in Low German Düwelsteene) these are the remains of a Neolithic dolmen from 3500–2800 B.C. These are the earlist evidence of human settlement in the local area.

=== Foundation/Name ===
Heiden was founded as the farm Heghinc. In the year 870, Heiden was first mentioned in a donation to a monastery. During its development to a settlement, Heiden was also named Heidion, Heithene, Hethen and finally Heyden. The origin of the Name Heiden is the heathland (German: Heideland), which is the natural landscape in Heidens area.

Since 1975, Heiden is a municipality.

== Population ==
Historical population

Year	Pop.	±% p.a.
1965	5,114	—
1970	5,479	+1.39%
1975	5,743	+0.95%
1980	5,962	+0.75%
1985	6,226	+0.87%
1990	6,888	+2.04%
1995	7,375	+1.38%

Year	Pop.	±% p.a.
2000	8,005	+1.65%
2005	8,129	+0.31%
2010	8,080	−0.12%
2015	8,152	+0.18%
2020	8,204	+0.13%
2025	8,777	+1.36%

Source: Landesdatabank Nordrhein-Westfalen

== Politics ==
The parties and associations in the municipal council were voted every five years.

	Christian Democratic Union of Germany	Social Democratic Party of Germany	UWG, an independent local voters association
2014	14 Seats	8 Seats	4 Seats

Patrick Voßkamp (CDU), whose term began in 2020, is the current mayor. He was preceded by Hans-Jürgen Benson (SPD), whose term began in 2015. Before 2015, the independent candidate Heiner Buß was mayor for 15 years.

=== Twin towns ===
- Heilbad Heiligenstadt, Thuringia, Germany
- Lancaster, Wisconsin, United States
- Rybno, Warmian-Masurian Voivodeship, Poland

== Gallery ==
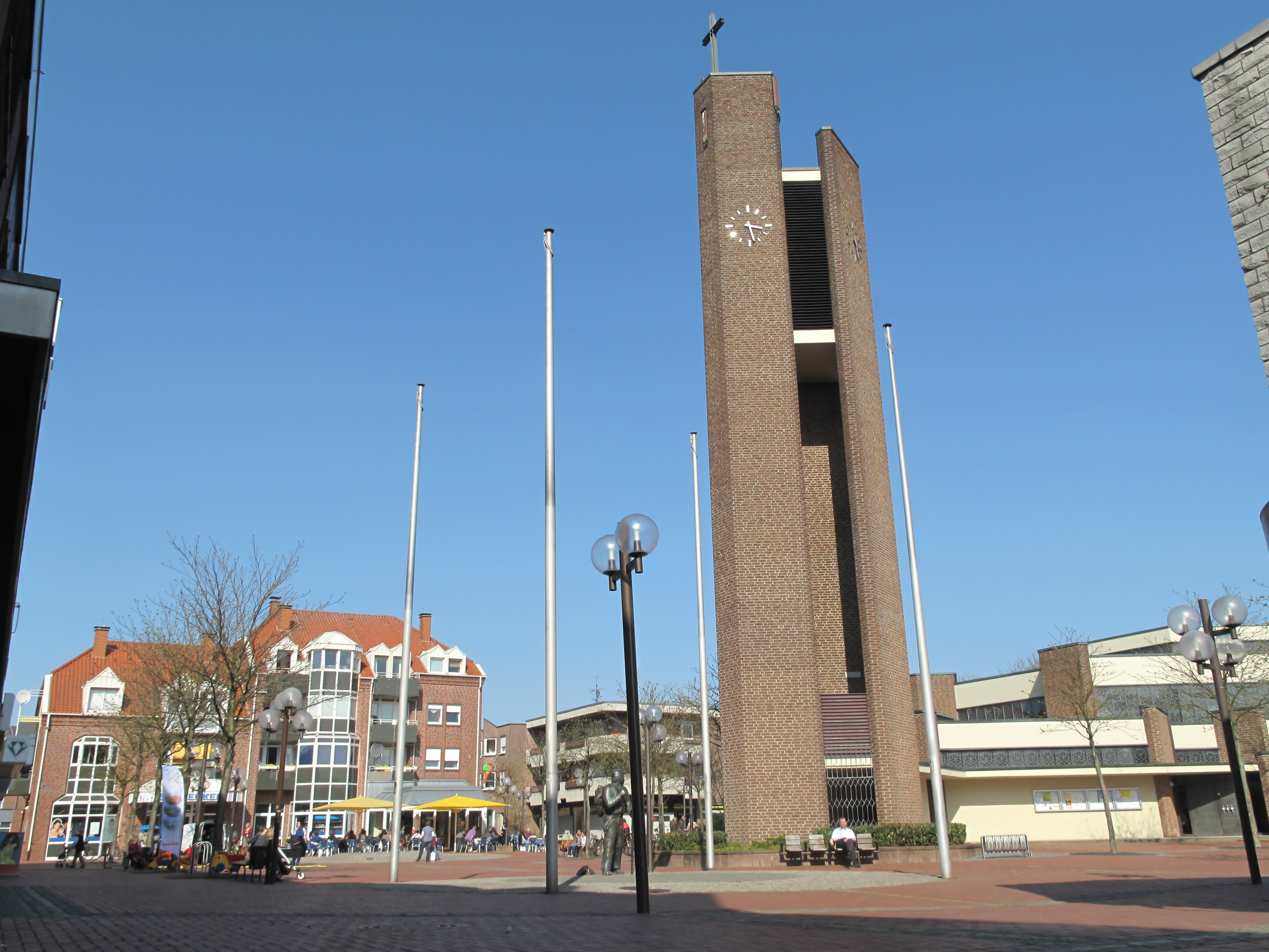
Heiden, modern church on the central square

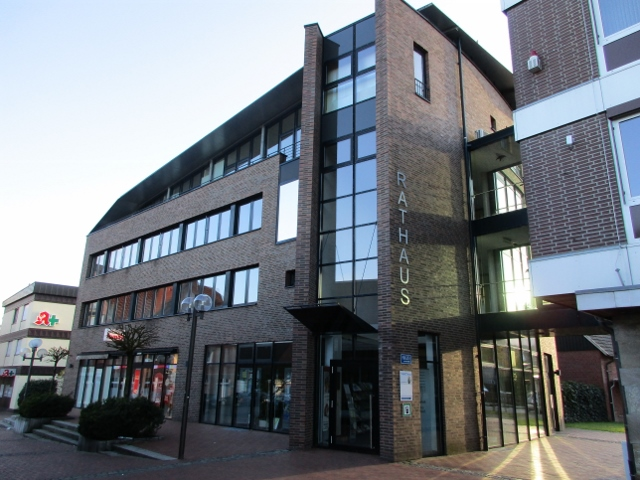
The modern municipal building, also on the central square

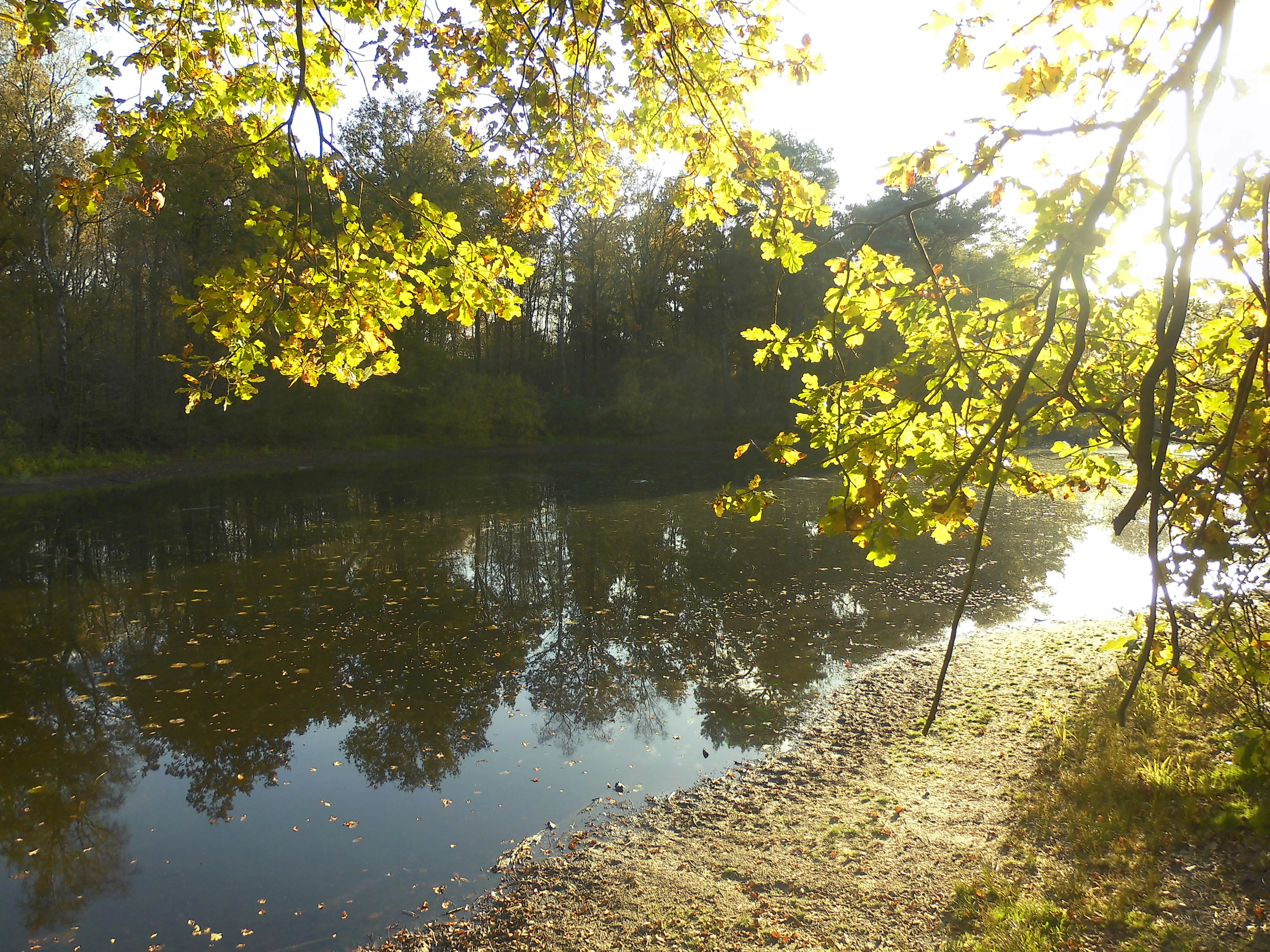
The lake Kranenmeer near Heiden
