= Ye-One Rhie =

German politician

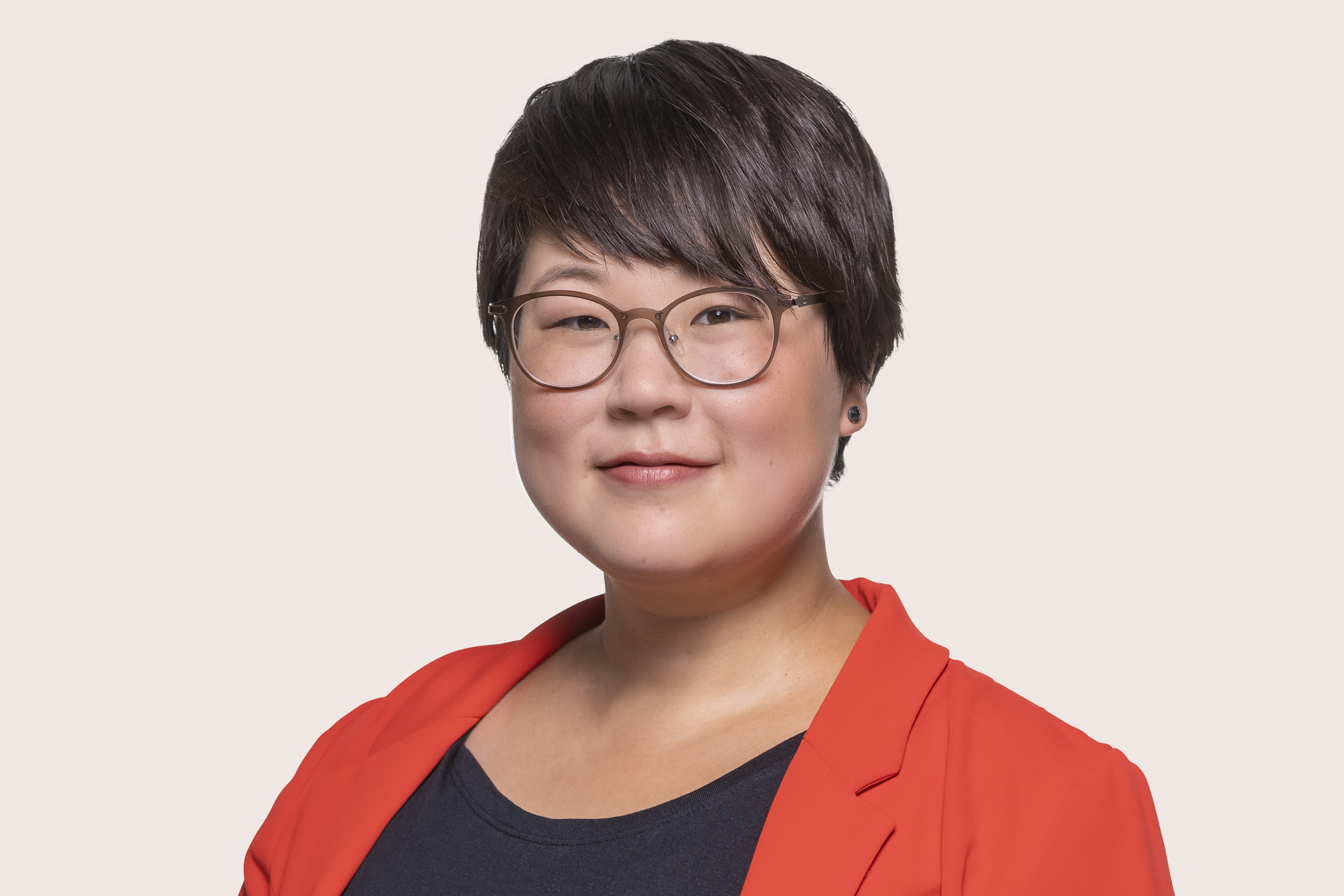

Member of the Bundestag
- In office 2021–2025

Personal details
- Born: 29 August 1987 (age 39) Aachen, West Germany (now Germany)
- Party: SPD

Ye-One Rhie (born 1987) is a German politician of Korean descent who was elected as a member of the Bundestag at the 2021 German federal election, on the SPD party list for North Rhine-Westphalia, and served until the 2025 election.

== Early life and career ==
Rhie was born in Aachen to South Korean parents. She studied political science and communication studies at RWTH Aachen University from 2006 to 2012.

Rhie began her professional career at the Bertelsmann Foundation in Gütersloh in 2013. From 2015 until 2021, she worked as an advisor at the State Ministry on Innovation, Science and Research in Düsseldorf.

== Political career ==
Since 2014, Rhie has been a member of the City Council of Aachen.

Rhie was elected to the Bundestag in the 2021 German federal election. In parliament, she has since been serving on the Committee on Education, Research and Technology Assessment.

In addition to her committee assignments, Rhie is part of the German Parliamentary Friendship Group for Relations with Benelux.

== Other activities ==
- Business Forum of the Social Democratic Party of Germany, Member of the Political Advisory Board (since 2022)
- In December 2022, Rhie became politically sponsor of 32-year-old rapper Toomaj Salehi an Iranian political prisoner who was in danger of imminent execution on bogus charges of “corruption on earth”.

== Personal life ==
Rhie shares an apartment with fellow parliamentarians Lena Werner and Brian Nickholz in the Moabit district of Berlin.
