= Brian Nickholz =

German politician (born 1989)

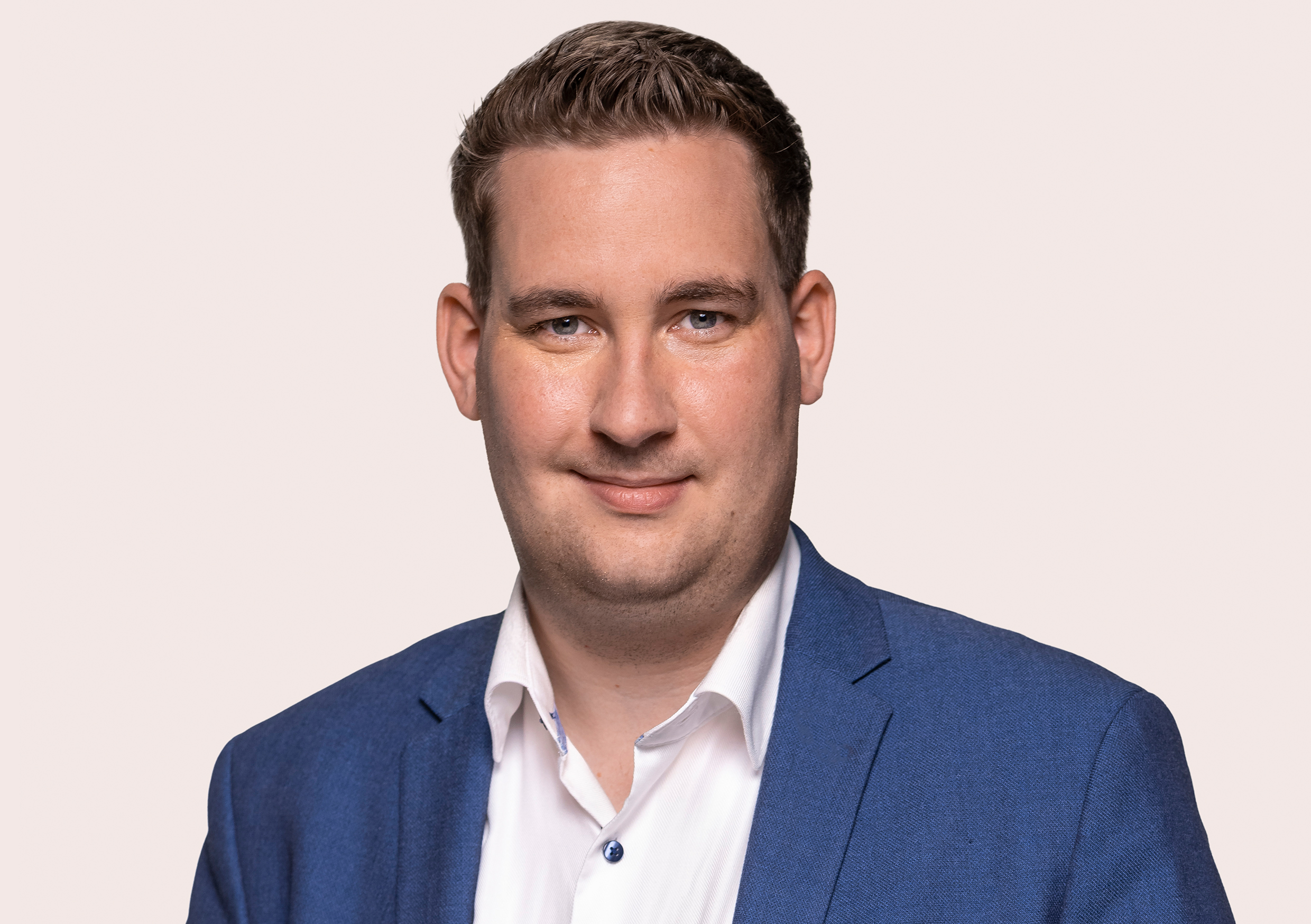

Member of the Bundestag
- Incumbent
- Assumed office 2021

Personal details
- Born: 22 December 1989 (age 36) Gelsenkirchen, Germany
- Party: SPD

Brian Nickholz (born 22 December 1989) is a German politician of the Social Democratic Party (SPD) who has been serving as a member of the Bundestag from 2021 to 2025.

== Education and profession ==
Nickholz was born 1989 in Gelsenkirchen and entered the SPD in 2005. Nickholz grew up in Marl. He trained as an industrial clerk after obtaining his general university entrance qualification. After his training, he was employed by Wilo SE in Dortmund as an Innovation Administrator. From 2013 to 2016, he worked as an assistant to the management and the executive board in central processing at the state association of the Socialist Youth of Germany - Die Falken NRW (SJD - Die Falken). From 2016 to 2021, he worked as full-time managing director of the SPD parliamentary group in the council of the city of Marl.

== Political activities ==
Brian Nickholz has been a member of the SPD since 2005. Nickholz was a member of the Marl City Council from 2009 to 2021. Before that, he was already a member of the SPD council faction as a knowledgeable citizen from 2007. In September 2020, he took over the School and Sports Committee chairmanship in the Council. From 2012 to 2016, he was the Juso district association chairman in the Recklinghausen district. Since 2014, he has been delegated by the Marl City Council to the supervisory board of Klinikum Vest GmbH and Klinikum Vest Service GmbH. Since 2015, he has been the SPD local association chairman of Alt-Marl/Brassert. He has been chairman of the Marl SPD municipal association since 2018. He was elected directly to the Bundestag in 2021 and has since been serving on the Committee on Housing, Urban Development, Building and Local Government. He won the Recklinghausen II federal constituency with 37.4% of the first-place votes. He also ran for 50th place on the state list of the SPD of North Rhine-Westphalia. In February 2025, Nickholz lost his seat in Bundestag against Lars Ehm.

== Memberships ==
Brian Nickholz is a member of the Workers' Welfare Association, Borussia Dortmund, the Association of Boy Scouts and Girl Guides, the tribe Knights of the Loe to the Loe Marl, the Social Democratic Community for Local Politics, the Federation for the Environment and Nature Conservation Germany, the support association Klara Hospiz e.V., Bergbautradition e.V., and the SJD - Die Falken and the Old Forge Marl.

== Other activities ==
- IG Bergbau, Chemie, Energie (IG BCE), Member

== Personal life ==
Nickholz shares an apartment with fellow parliamentarians Ye-One Rhie and Lena Werner in the Moabit district of Berlin. Nickholz is married.
