= Lena Werner =

German politician

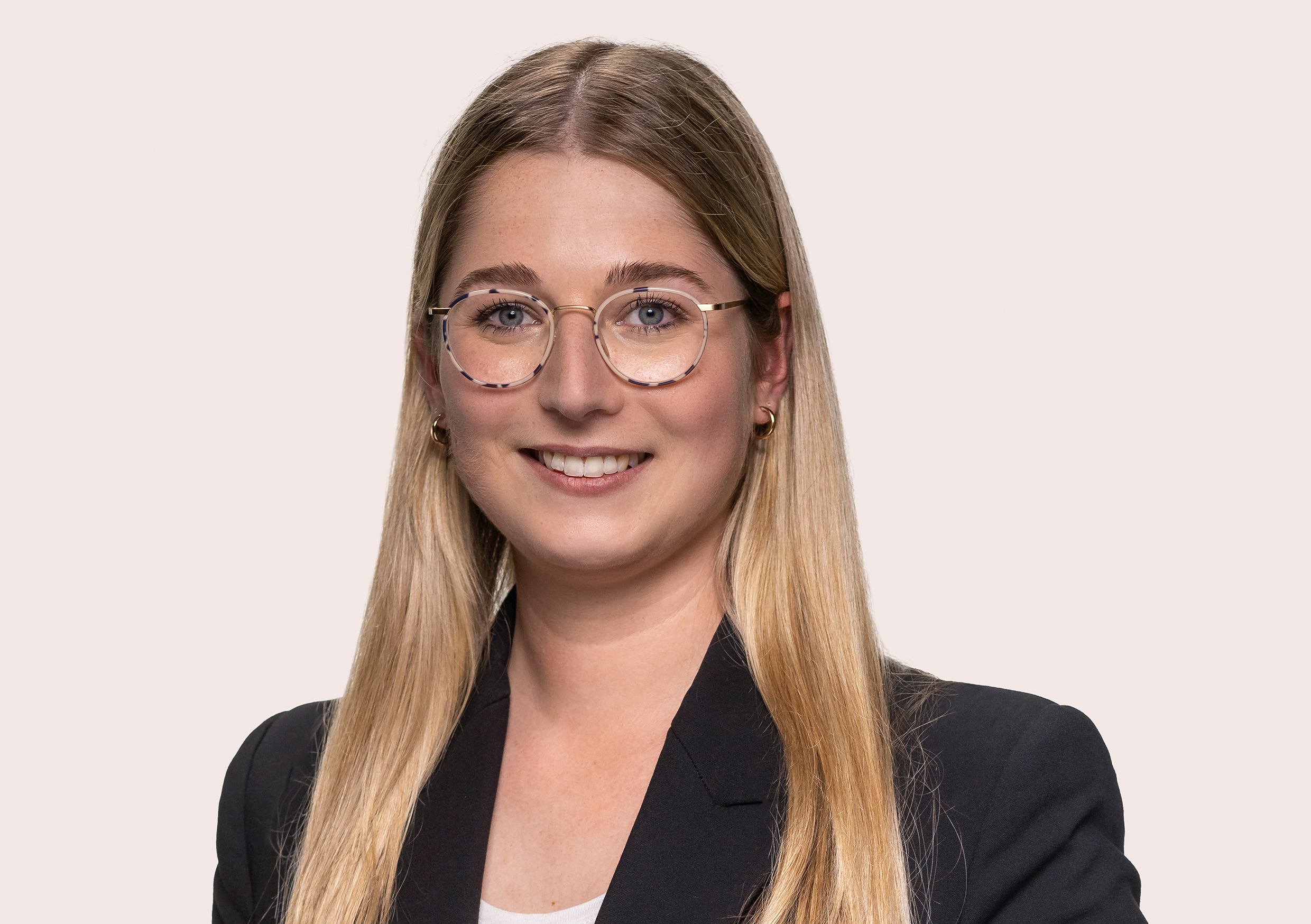

Member of the Bundestag
- Incumbent
- Assumed office 2021

Personal details
- Born: 8 October 1994 (age 32) Trier, Germany
- Party: SPD

Lena Werner (born 8 October 1994) is a German politician of the Social Democratic Party (SPD) who has been serving as a member of the Bundestag since 2021.

== Early life and education ==
Werner was born 1994 in Trier where she completed her training in event management. From 2020, she worked at the German Agency for International Cooperation (GIZ).

== Political career ==
Werner became a member of the Bundestag in 2021, representing the Bitburg district. In parliament, she has since been serving on the Committee on Economic Affairs and the Committee on Tourism.

== Other activities ==
- Business Forum of the Social Democratic Party of Germany, Member of the Political Advisory Board (since 2022)

== Personal life ==
Werner shares an apartment with fellow parliamentarians Ye-One Rhie and Brian Nickholz in the Moabit district of Berlin.
