= Michael Groß (politician) =

German politician

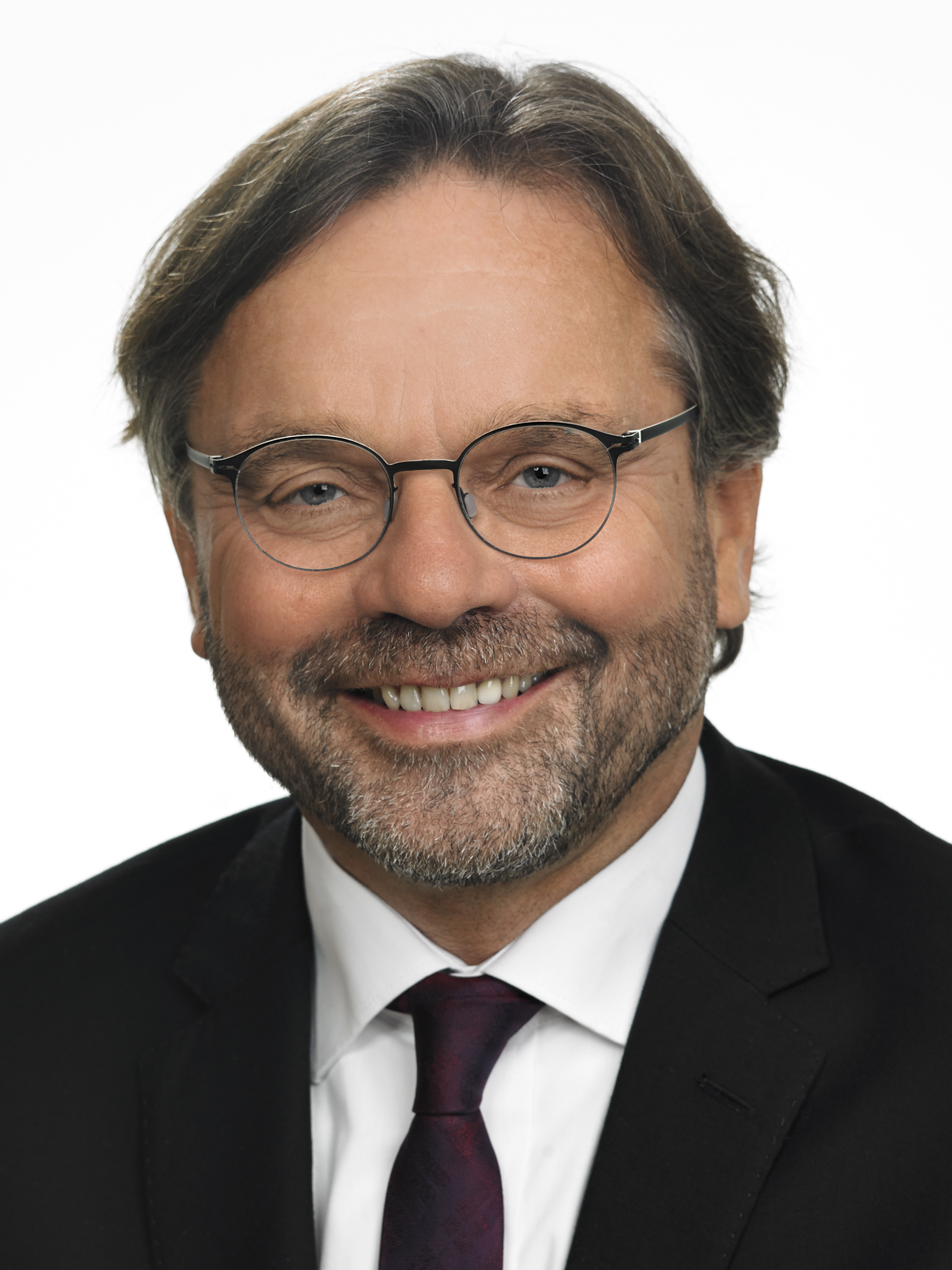
- Groß in 2014

Member of the German Bundestag for Recklinghausen II
- Incumbent
- Assumed office 2009
- Preceded by: Waltraud Lehn

Personal details
- Born: 26 July 1956 (age 69) Marl, West Germany (now Germany)
- Party: SPD

Michael Groß (born 26 July 1956) is a German politician of the Social Democratic Party (SPD) who has been serving as a member of the Bundestag from the state of North Rhine-Westphalia since 2009.

== Political career ==
Groß became a member of the Bundestag in the 2009 German federal election, representing the Recklinghausen II district. He is a member of the Committee on Legal Affairs and Consumer Protection, the Budget Committee and the Audit Committee. On the Budget Committee, he serves as his parliamentary group's rapporteur on the annual budget for the Federal Ministry of Labour and Social Affairs.
