= Herten =

- Town
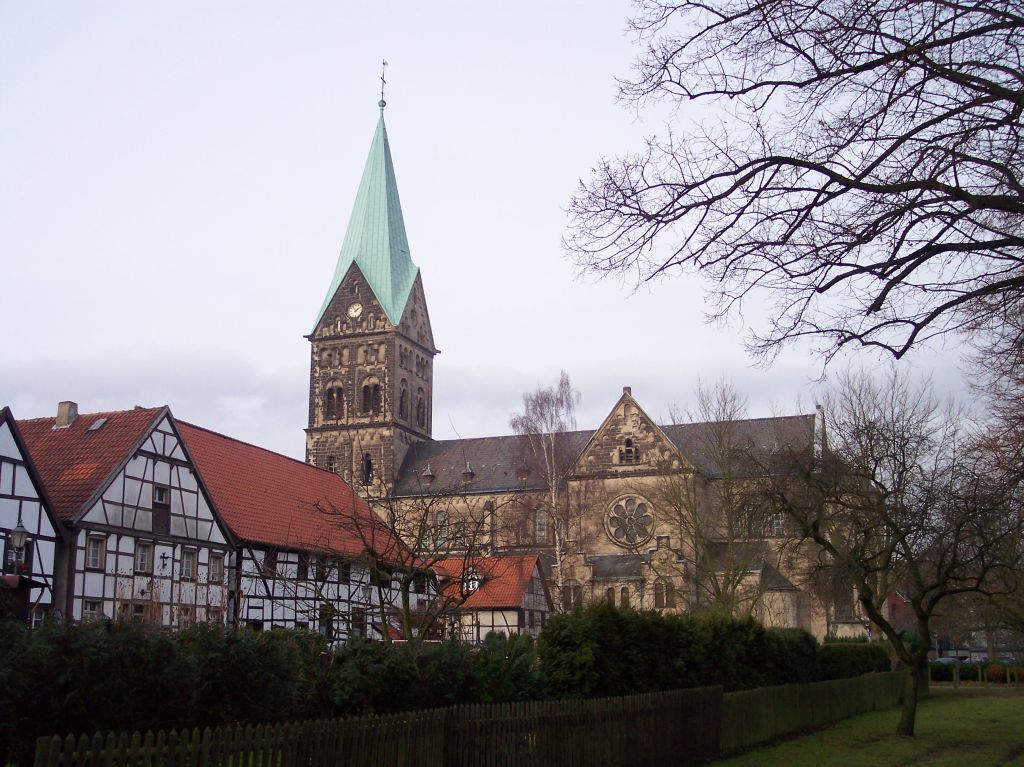
- Old centre of Herten-Westerholt

- Coat of arms

- Location of Herten within Recklinghausen district
- Interactive map of Herten
- Location within Germany Location within North Rhine-Westphalia
- Coordinates: 51°36′N 7°08′E
- Country: Germany
- State: North Rhine-Westphalia
- Admin. region: Münster
- District: Recklinghausen
- Subdivisions: 9

Government
  - Mayor (2025–30): Fred Toplak

Area
  - Total: 37.33 km^{2} (14.41 sq mi)
- Elevation: 75 m (246 ft)

Population (2025-12-31)
  - Total: 60,707
  - Density: 1,626/km^{2} (4,212/sq mi)
- Time zone: UTC+01:00 (CET)
  - Summer (DST): UTC+02:00 (CEST)
- Postal codes: 45699, 45701
- Dialling codes: 0 23 66, 02 09 (Westerholt), 0 23 65 (Marl)
- Vehicle registration: RE, CAS, GLA
- Website: www.herten.de

Herten (German pronunciation: [ˈhɛʁtn̩]; Westphalian: Hiätten) is a town and a municipality in the district of Recklinghausen, in North Rhine-Westphalia, Germany. It is situated in the industrial Ruhr Area, some five kilometres (three miles) west of Recklinghausen.

== Geography ==
=== Town area ===
Herten covers an area of 37.31 km^{2}, with a maximum north–south extent of 9.5 km, and a maximum east–west extent of 6.5 km. The municipality's highest natural point is in Scherlebeck, close to the border with Recklinghausen, with an altitude of 110 m.

Herten is divided into the following urban districts:

- Mitte
- Süd-West
- Süd-Ost
- Disteln
- Paschenberg
- Langenbochum
- Scherlebeck
- Westerholt
- Bertlich

=== Neighbouring towns ===
Herten borders Marl in the north, Recklinghausen in the east, Herne in the south, and Gelsenkirchen in the west.

== History ==
Herten was the seat of the governors of the County of Vest Recklinghausen, an autonomous state within the Archbishopric of Cologne. The first time Herten was mentioned in official documents was in 1050 as Herthene. In 1867 Herten was a village with 891 inhabitants. The first coal mines in Herten were founded in 1872 and Herten developed from a village to a mining town. Depending on additional workers, the coal mines attracted many people. Therefore, Herten rapidly grew by immigration from surrounding Westphalia, from the eastern provinces of Prussia and from eastern Europe. The number of inhabitants rose from 3,616 in 1890 to 6,698 in 1895 and to 12,186 in 1900. At the beginning of the 1920s, 18,519 people lived in Herten. When Herten obtained municipal status in 1936 it had 33,000 inhabitants.

During World War II, Herten was spared serious destruction, although it was hit by bombs 53 times. 62 civilians were killed and 143 injured, 18 industrial plants and commercial enterprises and 145 houses were destroyed or seriously damaged. Herten as a whole was destroyed by 16%. After the war 11,600 cubic metres of demolition rubble had to be removed from the streets.

After the villages Westerholt and Bertlich had been incorporated into Herten in 1975 the number of inhabitants rose to 70,676. Due to the crisis of the mining industry in the 1980s the number of inhabitants started declining. The last coal mine in Herten was closed in 2008.

== Population ==
Historical population

| Year | Pop. | ±% p.a. |
|---|---|---|
| 1965 | 70,060 | — |
| 1970 | 70,572 | +0.15% |
| 1975 | 70,645 | +0.02% |
| 1980 | 69,250 | −0.40% |
| 1985 | 68,009 | −0.36% |
| 1990 | 69,245 | +0.36% |
| 1995 | 69,183 | −0.02% |

| Year | Pop. | ±% p.a. |
|---|---|---|
| 2000 | 66,930 | −0.66% |
| 2005 | 64,807 | −0.64% |
| 2010 | 62,235 | −0.81% |
| 2015 | 61,163 | −0.35% |
| 2020 | 61,860 | +0.23% |
| 2025 | 60,707 | −0.38% |

Source: Landesdatabank Nordrhein-Westfalen

== Sights ==
Its best known sights are the moated red brick castle of Schloss Herten, dating back to the 14th century and surrounded by a park with a pavilion called Tabakhaus. The orangery dating from 1725 is just being renovated.

The "altes Dorf Westerholt" (Westerholt old village) with its many historic half-timbered houses is in the northwestern part of Herten. Westerholt is known for its castle Schloss Westerholt which was founded in 1359, and its present buildings date from 1833. The small chapel Schlosskapelle St. Martinus is just a small part of the remains of a church dating from 1310 which had been torn down in 1907. Beside the chapel a well-preserved medieval clocktower can be seen. Around the chapel and the castle many old wooden houses were renovated in the traditional style.

The former Ewald Colliery, which is a repurposed coal mine, now houses commercial space and a visitor center for green energy. Another cultural centre is Glashaus Herten dating from 1994.

== Rail transport ==
Originally Herten had a train station on the Oberhausen-Osterfeld Süd–Hamm railway which was inaugurated in 1905. Passenger services, however, were discontinued in 1983 and the train station has been shut since then. When the railway line was renovated and reopened for passenger trains of line no. 9 of Rhine-Ruhr S-Bahn in September 2020 the train station of Herten was not reopened again and since then the trains have passed Herten without stopping there. In August 2021, however, construction of a new train station in the centre of Herten was started. This new train station Herten (Westf) was inaugurated on 11 December 2022. Line no. 9 of the Rhine-Ruhr S-Bahn offers direct rail connections from Herten to Recklinghausen, Essen, Wuppertal and Hagen in the Rhine-Ruhr Metropolitan Region. Another new train station was built in Westerholt. It was inaugurated in December 2025.

== Twin towns – sister cities ==
Herten is twinned with:

- Arras, France
- (England) Doncaster, United Kingdom
- Schneeberg, Germany
- Szczytno, Poland

== Notable people ==
- Adolf Galland (1912–1996), Luftwaffe General (Air Chief Marshal)
- Barbara Mensing (born 1960), archer
- Ludger Pistor (born 1959), actor
- Christian Timm (born 1979), footballer
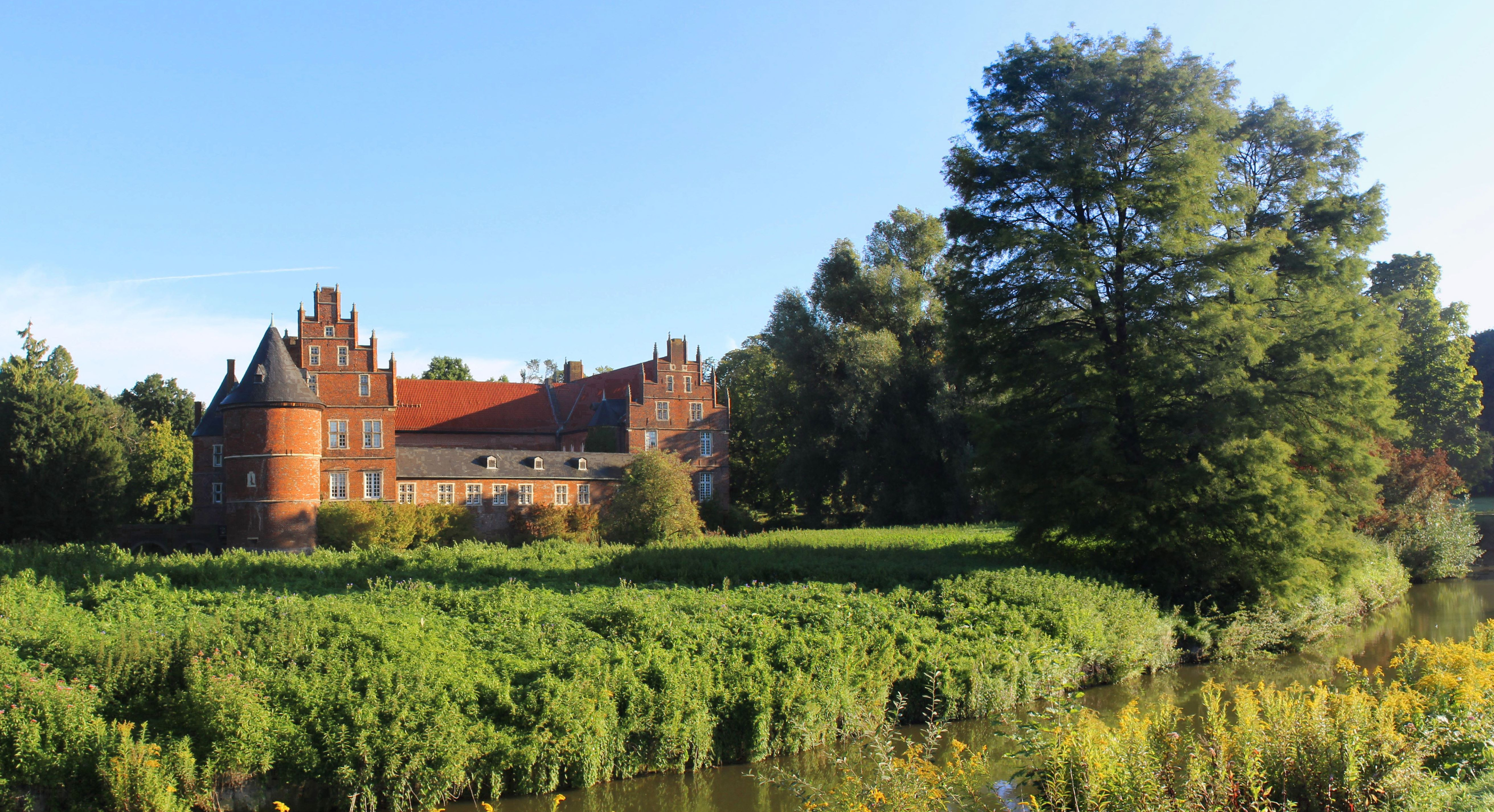
Castle Schloss Herten

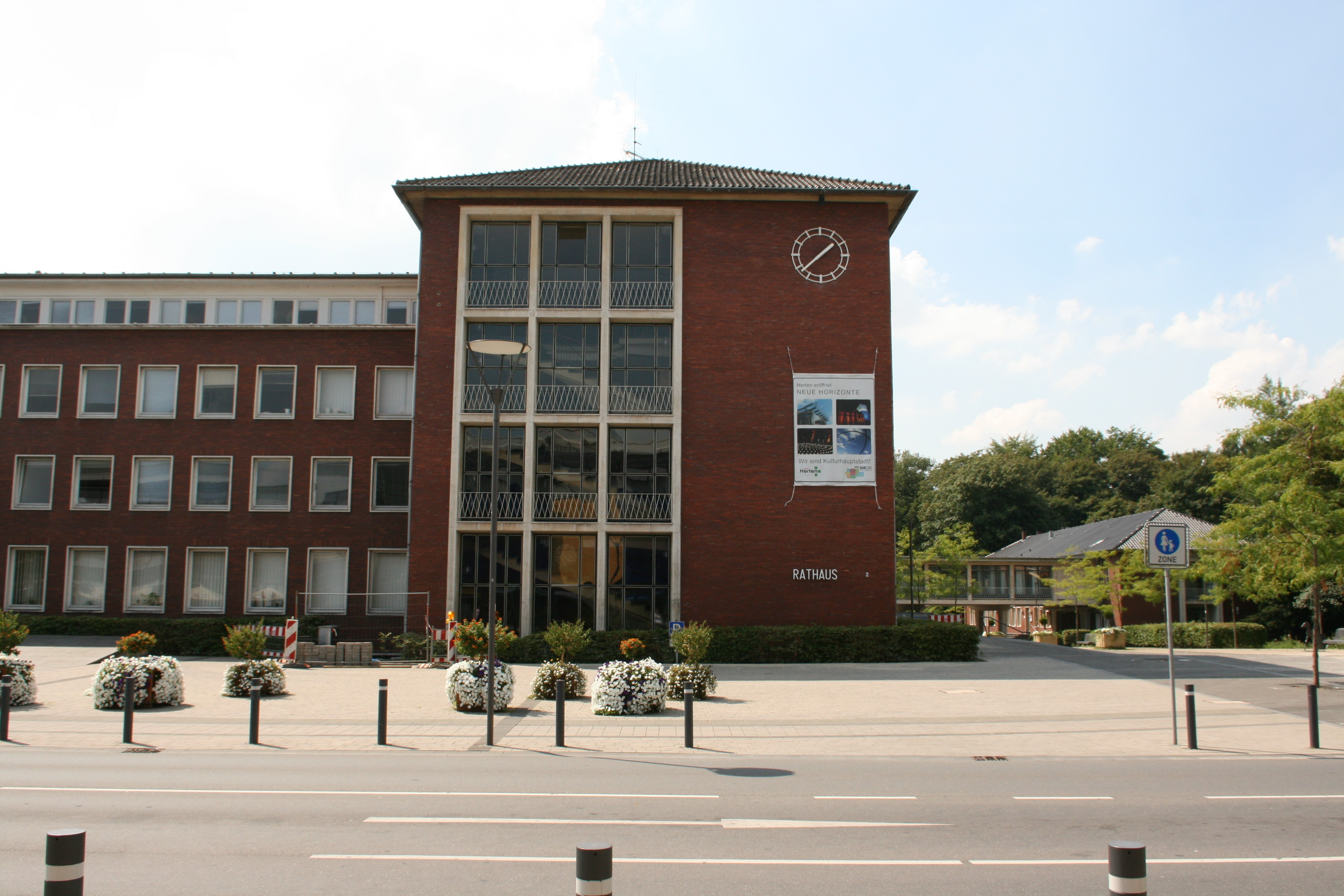
Town Hall

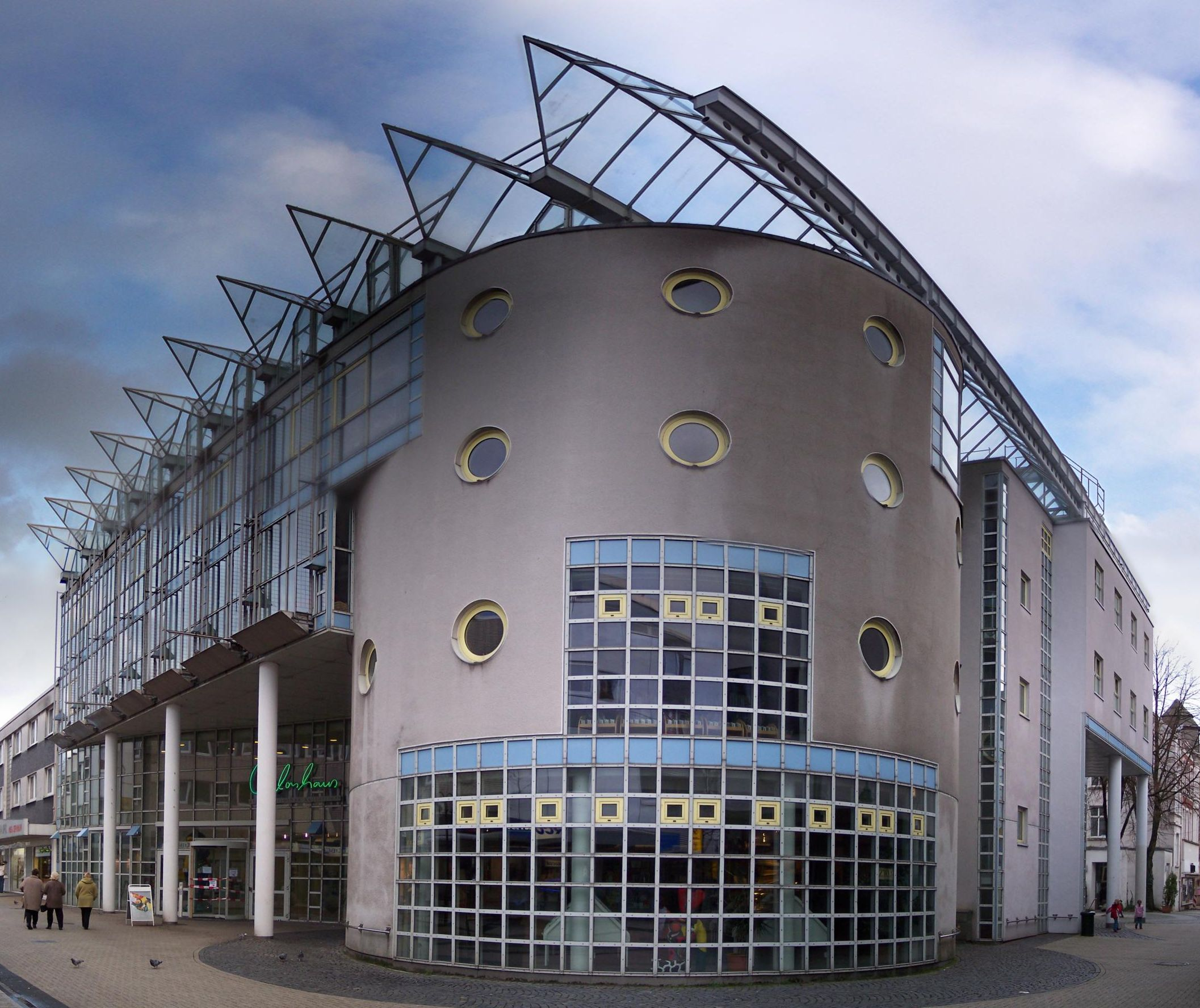
Cultural centre Glashaus Herten

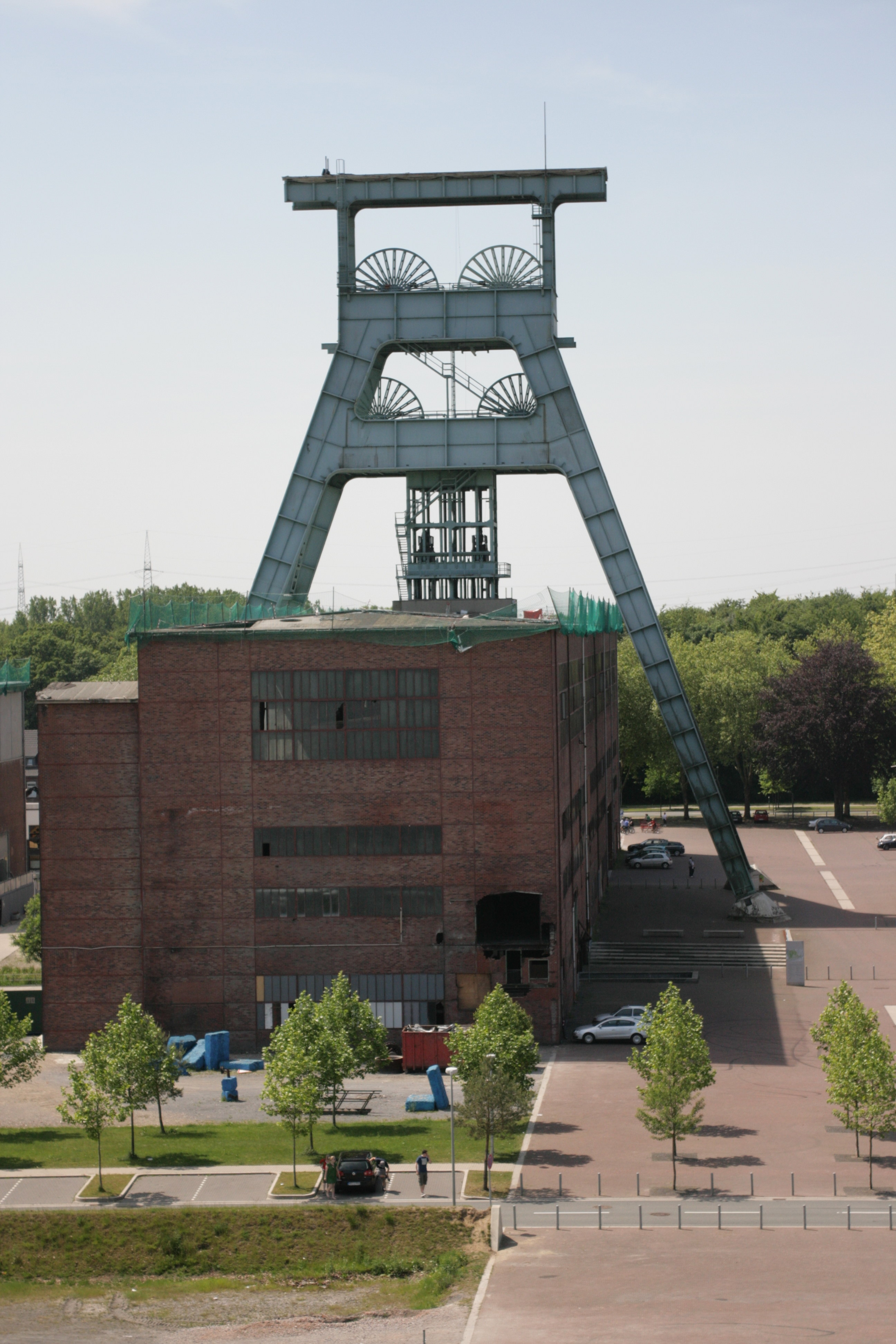
Ewald colliery

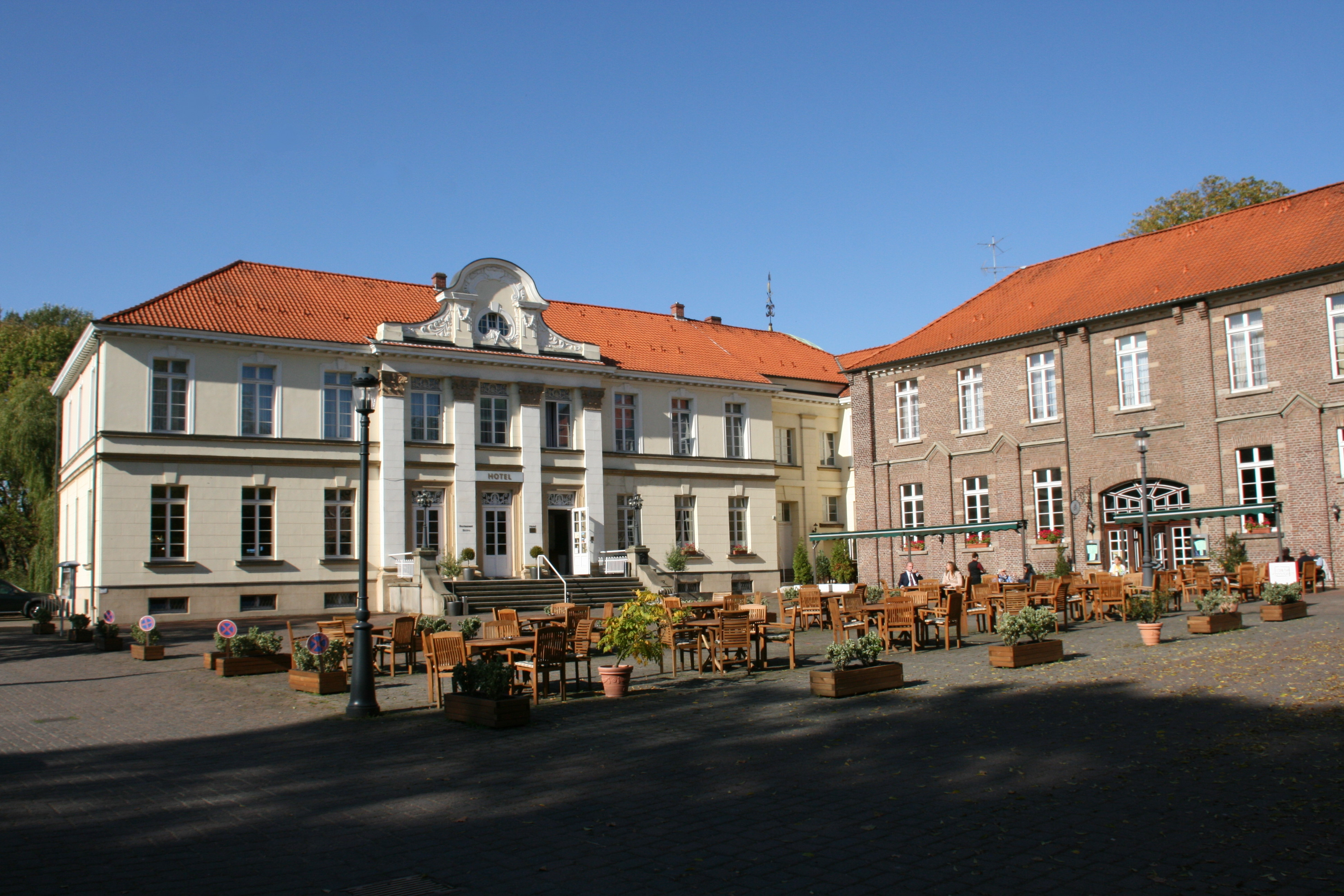
Castle Schloss Westerholt

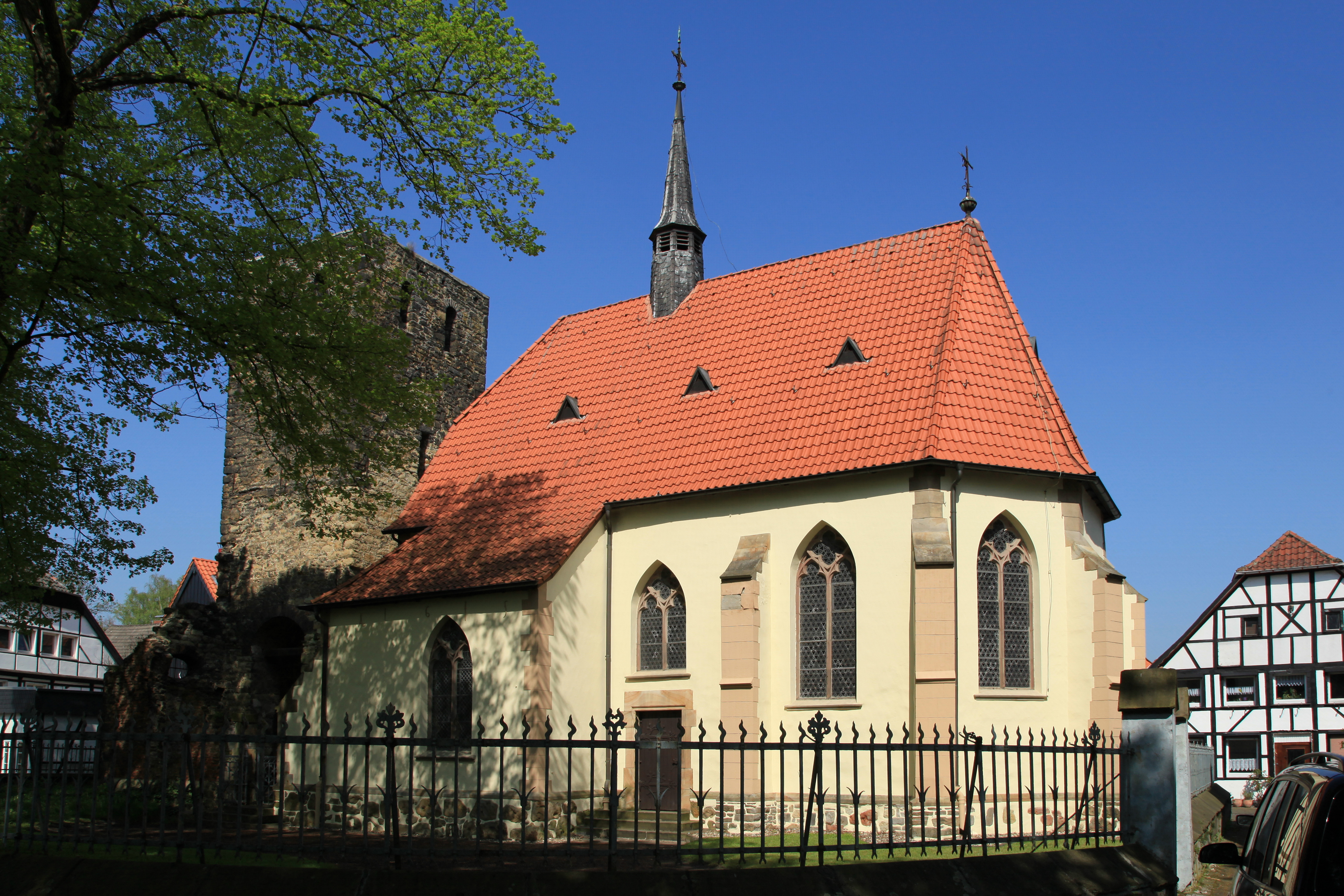
Chapel Schlosskapelle St. Martinus

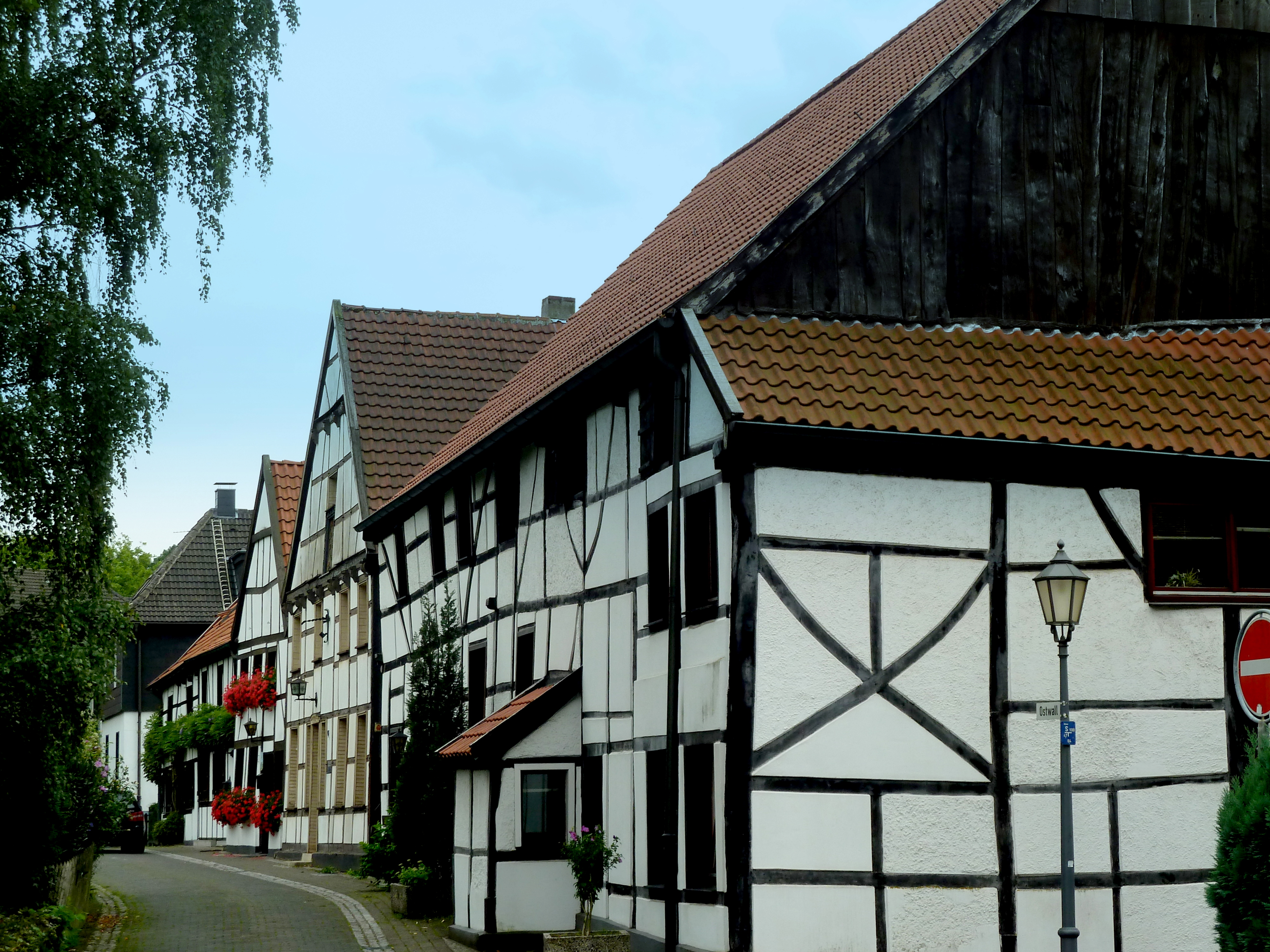
Wooden houses in Westerholt

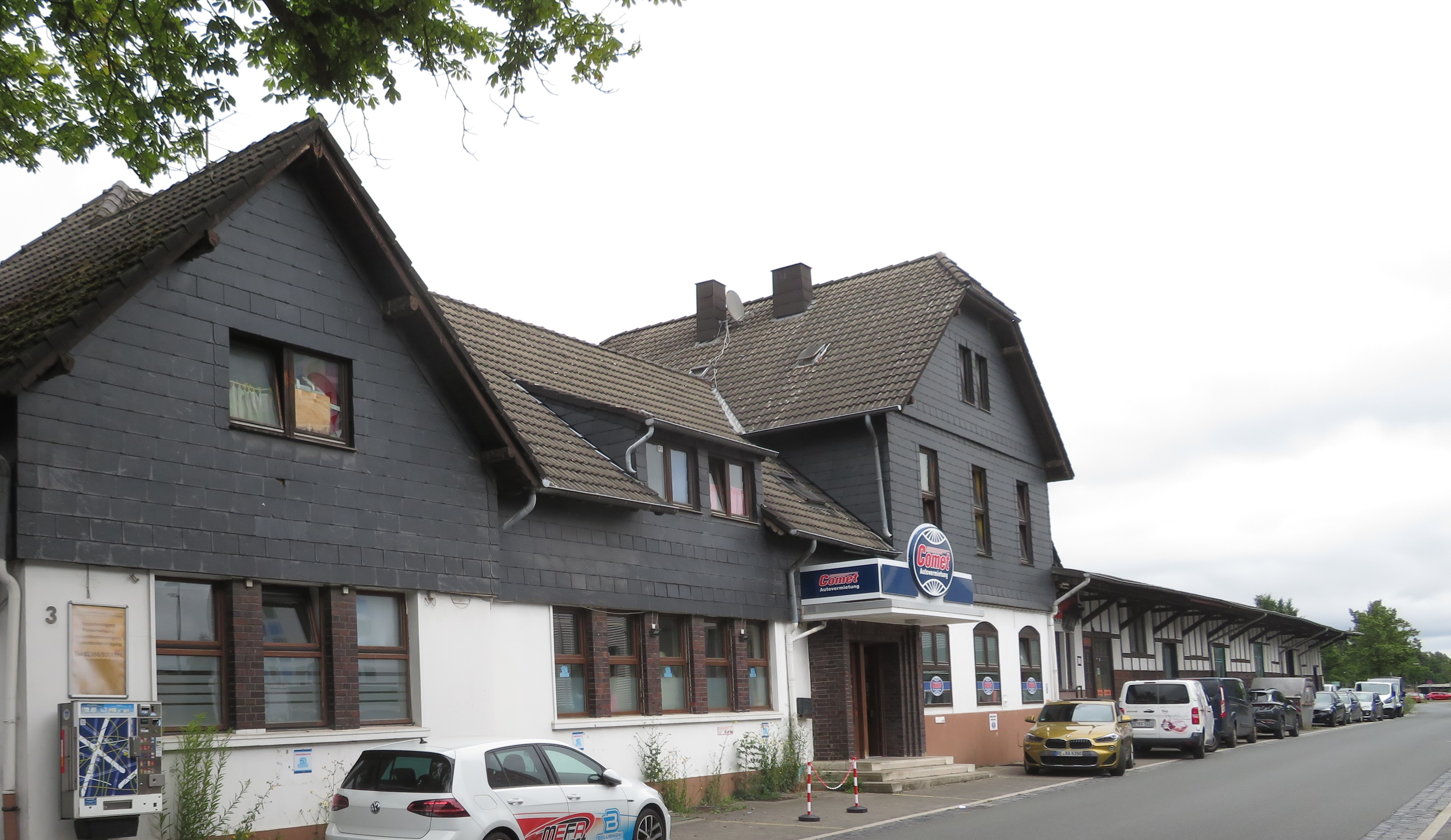
Former railway station

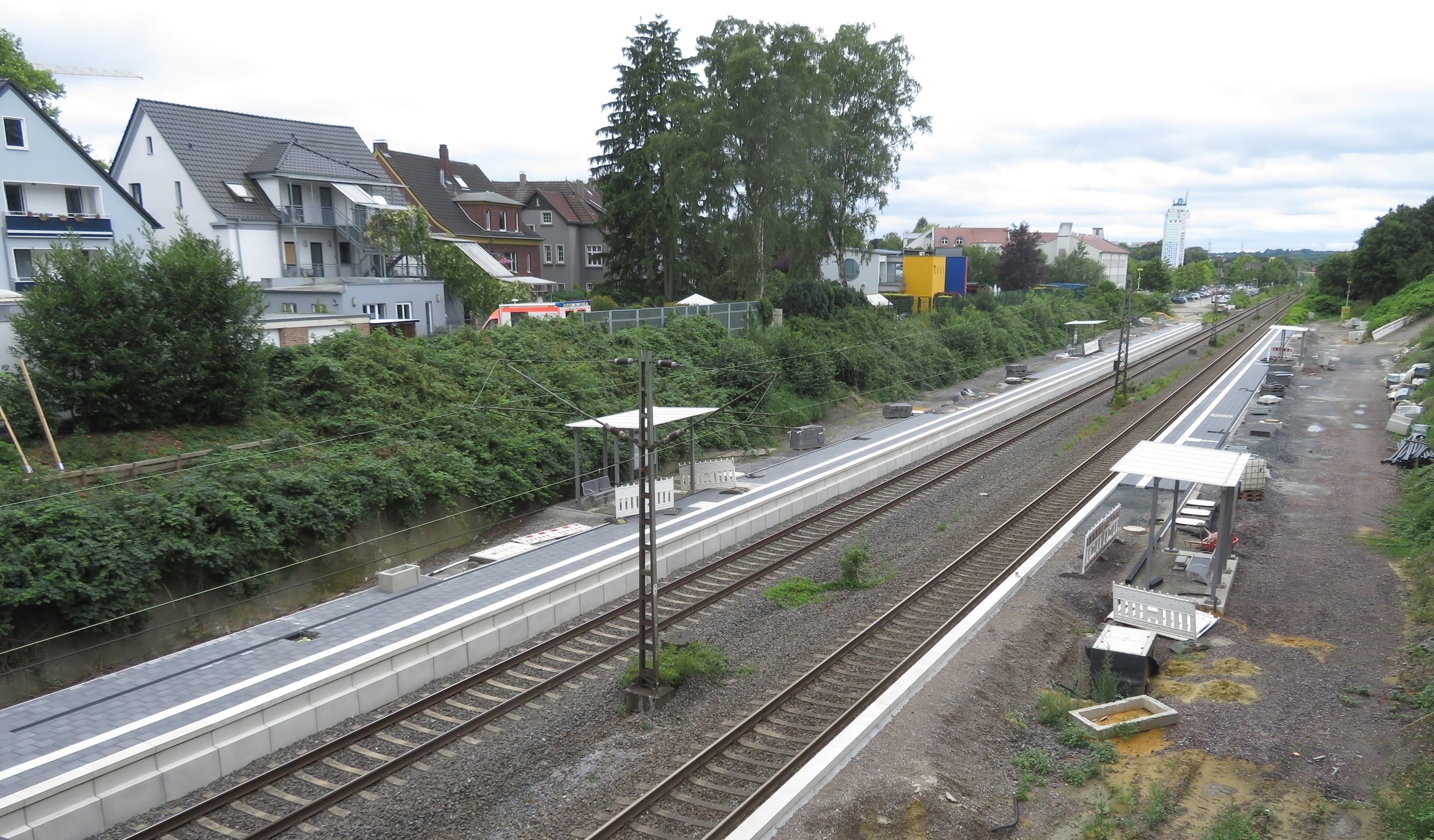
New railway station under construction in July 2022
