= Recklinghausen (district) =

Coordinates: 51°40′N 7°10′E

- District
- Flag Coat of arms
- Country: Germany
- State: North Rhine-Westphalia
- Adm. region: Münster
- Capital: Recklinghausen

Government
  - District admin.: Bodo Klimpel (CDU)

Area
  - Total: 760.27 km^{2} (293.54 sq mi)

Population (31 December 2024)
  - Total: 621,305
  - Density: 817.22/km^{2} (2,116.6/sq mi)
- Time zone: UTC+01:00 (CET)
  - Summer (DST): UTC+02:00 (CEST)
- Vehicle registration: RE, GLA, CAS

Recklinghausen (German pronunciation: [ʁɛklɪŋˈhaʊzən]) is a Kreis (district) in the centre of North Rhine-Westphalia, Germany. It is surrounded by the neighbouring districts of Borken, Coesfeld, Unna, Gelsenkirchen, Bottrop, and Wesel. The district administration is located in the city of the same name.

Apart from the Region Hannover, Kreis Recklinghausen is the largest non-city district in Germany by population.

== History ==
During medieval times, the area surrounding present-day Recklinghausen was known as Vest Recklinghausen, a territory which belonged to the Electorate of Cologne. From 1446 to 1576, this area was leased to the lordship of Gemen (now a part of the city Borken) and Schaumburg-Lippe. In 1803, after the Reichsdeputationshauptschluss, the city and district became a principality united to the Duchy of Arenberg (the heads of the House of Arenberg still hold this princely title). In 1811, the territory was added to the Grand Duchy of Berg, and in 1815 it became part of the Prussian Province of Westphalia.

The district was created in 1816. After several changes it obtained its present borders with the last reorganizations of 1975–76. It is also one of the oldest districts located in Germany.

== Geography ==
The district Recklinghausen is located at the north of the Ruhr area with the urban parts of Ruhr area to the south and the rural Münsterland to the north. The Lippe River flows through the district. Gladbeck is a pene-exclave of the district as it shares a border of less than 500 meters with Dorsten that has no road crossings.

== Coat of arms ==
The coat of arms show a silver nettle leaf on green ground - the sign of the Herrlichkeit Lembeck, an Amt (subdivision) in the clerical state of Münster. The black cross is the sign of the Bishops of Cologne who owned a big part of the district's area, the Vest Recklinghausen. The key inside the cross symbolizes St. Peter, the patron of Cologne.

== Towns and municipalities ==
Clickable map of towns and municipalities in the district

1. Castrop-Rauxel
2. Datteln
3. Dorsten
4. Gladbeck
5. Haltern am See
6. Herten
7. Marl
8. Oer-Erkenschwick
9. Recklinghausen
10. Waltrop

== Partner districts ==
- Wodzisław County, Poland.
- Landstinget Sörmland, Sweden
