= Oer-Erkenschwick =

- Town
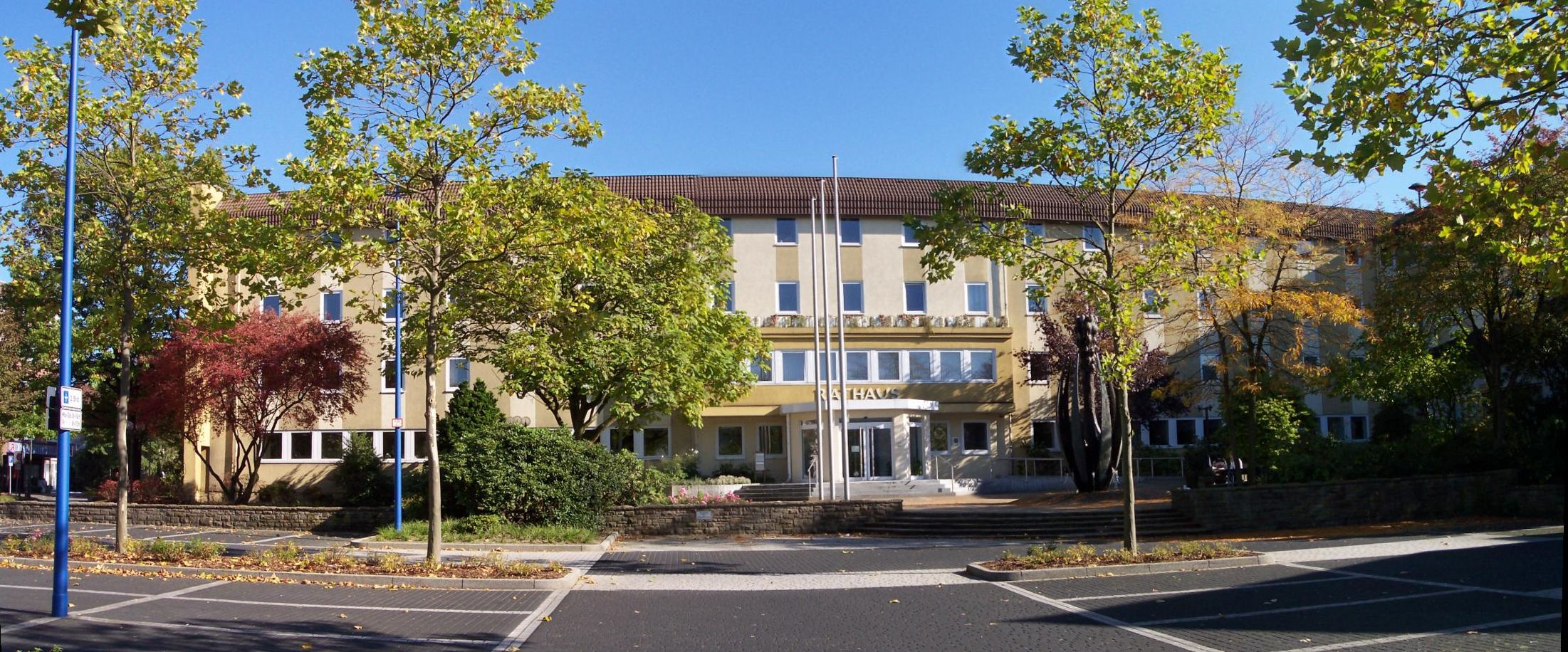
- Town hall

- Coat of arms

- Location of Oer-Erkenschwick within Recklinghausen district
- Interactive map of Oer-Erkenschwick
- Location within Germany Location within North Rhine-Westphalia
- Coordinates: 51°38′32″N 7°15′03″E
- Country: Germany
- State: North Rhine-Westphalia
- Admin. region: Münster
- District: Recklinghausen

Government
  - Mayor (2025–30): Shoaiub Nazir (SPD)

Area
  - Total: 38.66 km^{2} (14.93 sq mi)
- Elevation: 72 m (236 ft)

Population (2025-12-31)
  - Total: 31,499
  - Density: 814.8/km^{2} (2,110/sq mi)
- Time zone: UTC+01:00 (CET)
  - Summer (DST): UTC+02:00 (CEST)
- Postal codes: 45739
- Dialling codes: 0 23 68
- Vehicle registration: RE
- Website: www.oer-erkenschwick.de

Oer-Erkenschwick (German pronunciation: [ˌoːɐ̯ˈʔɛʁkn̩ʃvɪk]) is a town in the district of Recklinghausen, in North Rhine-Westphalia, Germany. It is situated approximately 5 km north-east of Recklinghausen, on the northern periphery of the Ruhrgebiet. When pronouncing the name, “Oer” should be pronounced like the German Ohr, not Ör.

== Geography ==
Oer-Erkenschwick is situated east of the city of Recklinghausen and on the southern edge of the Hohe Mark Nature Park.

== Population ==
Historical population

Year	Pop.	±% p.a.
1965	24,075	—
1970	24,360	+0.24%
1975	25,292	+0.75%
1980	27,329	+1.56%
1985	27,157	−0.13%
1990	28,222	+0.77%
1995	30,302	+1.43%

Year	Pop.	±% p.a.
2000	30,686	+0.25%
2005	30,397	−0.19%
2010	30,312	−0.06%
2015	31,387	+0.70%
2020	31,532	+0.09%
2025	31,499	−0.02%

Source: Landesdatabank Nordrhein-Westfalen

== Sports ==
The town is the home of football club SpVgg Erkenschwick.

== Twin towns – sister cities ==
Oer-Erkenschwick is twinned with:

- Alanya, Turkey
- Halluin, France
- Kočevje, Slovenia
- Lübbenau, Germany
- North Tyneside, England, United Kingdom
- Pniewy, Poland

== Notable people ==
- Moondog (1916–1999), American musician and composer, lived there for a while
- Horst Szymaniak (1934–2009), footballer
- Klaus Wennemann (1940–2000), actor
