= List of places in Germany =

This is a list of places in Germany. For cities see List of cities in Germany; for districts see List of districts of Germany; for urban districts see Urban districts of Germany.

- List of places in Baden-Württemberg
- List of places in Bavaria (Bayern)
- List of places in Brandenburg
- List of places in Hesse (Hessen)
- List of places in Lower Saxony (Niedersachsen)
- List of places in Mecklenburg-Western Pomerania (Mecklenburg-Vorpommern)
- List of places in North Rhine-Westphalia (Nordrhein-Westfalen)
- List of places in Rhineland-Palatinate (Rheinland-Pfalz)
- List of places in Saarland
- List of places in Saxony (Sachsen)
- List of places in Saxony-Anhalt (Sachsen-Anhalt)
- List of places in Schleswig-Holstein
- List of places in Thuringia (Thüringen)
- List of places in Germany named after people
