= Lists of places =

Here is a list of places on Earth, based on specific categories.

== General lists of places ==
=== Lists of countries ===
- Lists of sovereign states and dependent territories
- List of countries by name, by capital, by government
- by area
- by continent
- by country code
  - Federal Information Processing Standard (FIPS) two-letter
  - International Olympic Committee (IOC) three-letter
  - Internet TLDs
  - ISO 3166-1 two and three-letter
  - ITU country calling numbers
- by name
- by national capital
- by official language
- by population
- by population density
- by time zone
- List of oil-producing states
- List of flags
- List of regions
  - List of territorial disputes
  - List of active autonomist and secessionist movements

==== Dependent areas ====
- List of dependent territories
- List of subnational entities
- Table of administrative country subdivisions by country

==== Pseudo-states ====
- List of extinct countries, empires, etc.
- List of micronations

=== Cities ===
- List of city listings by country
- Lists of cities

==== Capitals ====
  - List of national capitals by name (present and past)
  - List of capitals and larger cities by country
  - List of current and former capital cities within U.S. states
- List of metropolitan areas by population
- List of the world's most populous cities
- List of cities in India
- List of planned cities
- List of city nicknames in the United States
- List of towns
- List of places in London
- List of Brooklyn, New York neighborhoods
- List of Manhattan, New York neighborhoods
- List of urban studies topics
- List of named ethnic enclaves in North American cities

=== Ecclesiastic ===
  - List of abbeys and priories
    - Ireland
    - England
    - Scotland
    - Wales
    - Northern Ireland
    - Isle of Man
  - List of cathedrals
  - List of churches and cathedrals of London
  - List of Shinto shrines

=== Secular ===
- List of aquaria
- List of botanical gardens
- List of buildings
- List of largest suspension bridges
- List of castles
- Lists of cemeteries by country
- List of reservoirs and dams
- List of gardens
- List of historic houses
- List of hospitals
- List of museums
- List of museum ships
- List of Japanese landmarks
- List of public outdoor clothes free places
- List of skyscrapers
  - Tall buildings in London
  - Tall buildings in Melbourne
- List of spa towns
- List of United States military bases
- List of mean centers of U.S. population during the 20th century
- List of walls
- List of waterfalls
- List of World Heritage Sites
- List of zoos

=== Man-made geographical features ===
- List of buildings
- List of countries
  - List of extinct countries, empires, etc.
- List of cities
  - Twin cities
  - Twin towns
  - Sister cities
- List of national capitals
  - List of historical national capitals
- List of schools

=== Natural geographical features ===
- List of impact craters
- List of mountains
- List of rivers
- List of waterways
- List of waterfalls

=== Islands ===
- Lists of islands
  - by name
  - by population
  - by population density
  - by area
  - by highest point
- List of archipelagos
  - by number of islands
- List of isolated islands and archipelagos
- List of artificial islands
- List of island countries
  - by population density
- List of divided islands
- Lake island

== Lists of places in a country ==
- List of places in Belarus
- List of places in Cuba
- List of places in Germany
- List of places in Iraq
- List of places in the Netherlands
- List of places in the United Kingdom
- List of places in the United States

== Lists of places in a state or city ==
- Victoria, Australia:
  - List of localities in Victoria, Local government areas of Victoria, and Counties of Victoria
  - List of Melbourne suburbs

== Lists of places by name etymology ==
- List of places named after people
  - List of things named after Queen Anne
  - List of places named for Lewis Cass
  - List of places named for DeWitt Clinton
  - List of places named for Christopher Columbus
  - List of places named for the Marquis de Lafayette
  - List of places named after Saint Francis
  - List of places named for Benjamin Franklin
  - List of places named for Charles de Gaulle
  - List of places named for Pope John Paul II
  - List of places named for Nathanael Greene
  - List of places named for Sam Houston
  - List of places named for Andrew Jackson
  - List of places named for Thomas Jefferson
  - List of things named after Tadeusz Kościuszko
  - List of places named after Lenin
  - List of places named for James Madison
  - List of places named for Francis Marion
  - List of places named for James Monroe
  - List of places named for Richard Montgomery
  - List of places named for James K. Polk
  - List of places named for Israel Putnam
  - List of places named after Stalin
  - List of places named after Tito
  - List of places named after Queen Victoria
  - List of places named for George Washington
- List of places named after peace
- List of populated places named after populated places
- List of non-US places that have a US place named after them

== Other lists of places ==
- List of chemical elements named after places
- List of places with 'Silicon' names
- List of research parks
- Lists of political and geographic subdivisions by total area
- List of short place names
- List of long place names

== Extraterrestrial features/regions ==
- Lists of geological features of the Solar System
- List of mountains on Venus
- List of mountains on Mars
- List of mountains on Io
- List of craters on Venus
- List of craters on Mars
- List of craters on Europa
- List of craters on Ganymede
- List of craters on Callisto
- Phobos (moon)#Named geological features
- Deimos (moon)#Named geological features
- List of valleys on the Moon

== See also ==
- Lists of things named after places
