= List of places in Lower Saxony =

This is a list of geographical features in the state of Lower Saxony, Germany.

== Mountains ==
- Harz
- Weserbergland

== Rivers ==
- Aller
- Bode
- Elbe
- Ems
- Fulda
- Hunte
- Innerste
- Leine
- Neetze
- Oker
- Oste
- Werra
- Weser

== Lakes ==
- Dümmer
- Steinhuder Meer
- Zwischenahner Meer

== Islands ==
- Borkum
- East Frisian Islands

== Miscellaneous ==
- East Frisia
- Emsland
- Frisia
- Harz National Park
- Hildesheim Börde
- Lower Saxony Wadden Sea National Park
- Lüneburg Heath
- Wadden Sea
- Wendland
- Teutoburg Forest

== Cities ==
List of cities in Lower Saxony by population
