= List of places in Germany named after people =

This is a list of inhabited places in Germany which are named after people. The etymology is generally referenced in the article about the person or the place.

== A ==
- Adelheidsdorf (state of Lower Saxony) – Queen Adelaide of Hanover, Great Britain and Ireland (est. in 1831 in drained former Wietzenbruch swamp)
- Adolf-Wenz-Siedlung (State of Bavaria) - Adolf Wenz (1840-1927), businessman
- Adolphsdorf (state of Lower Saxony) – Prince Adolphus, Duke of Cambridge, Viceroy of Hanover (est. 1800, incorporated into Grasberg in 1974.)
- Agathenburg (state of Lower Saxony) – Agathe von Leesten/Lehsten, wife of Bremen-Verden's general governor Hans Christoff von Königsmarck.
- Annaburg (state of Saxony-Anhalt) – Princess Anna of Denmark and Norway (1532–1585), electress consort of Augustus the Strong
- Augsburg (state of Bavaria) – Roman Caesar Augustus
- Augustdorf (state of North Rhine-Westphalia) – Simon August, Count of Lippe-Detmold (est. 1779, named after the count in 1789).
- Augustendorf (state of Lower Saxony) – Princess Augusta of Hesse-Kassel, consort of Prince Adolphus, Duke of Cambridge, Viceroy of Hanover (est. 1827, incorporated into Gnarrenburg in 1974.)
- Augustusburg (state of Saxony) – Augustus, Elector of Saxony

== B ==
- Bad Karlshafen (state of Hesse) – Charles I, Landgrave of Hesse-Kassel
- Bad Wilhelmshöhe (in German) (state of Hesse) – William I, Elector of Hesse (a quarter of today's Kassel)
- Benediktbeuern (state of Bavaria) – Benedict of Nursia
- Borsigwalde (state of Berlin) – engineer August Borsig (est. 1898, incorporated into Berlin on 1 October 1920.)
- Brunswick (state of Lower Saxony) – Bruno, Duke of Saxony

== C ==
- Cäciliengroden (state of Lower Saxony) – Princess Cecilia of Sweden (1807–1844), grand duchess consort to Grand Duke Frederick Augustus I of Oldenburg (est. 1844 and settled 1938/39, incorporated into Sande in Frisia)
- Carlsburg (state of Bremen) – Charles XI of Sweden (est. 1672, incorporated into Bremerhaven in 1827)
- Charlottenburg (state of Berlin) – Princess Sophia Charlotte of Hanover, queen consort of King Frederick I of Prussia (est. 13th century, incorporated into Berlin on 1 October 1920)
- Christian-Albrechts-Koog (state of Schleswig-Holstein) – Christian Albert, Duke of Holstein-Gottorp (since 1974 a part of Galmsbüll)
- Clemenshammer (state of North Rhine-Westphalia) – Clemens auf dem Hammer, purchaser of ironworks in 1580 (est. before 1580, incorporated into Remscheid in 1929)
- Cologne (state of North Rhine-Westphalia; German: Köln, Latin: Colonia Claudia Ara Agrippinensium, CCAA) – Roman Emperor Claudius and Agrippina the Younger, empress consort (lit. Claudian colony and sacrificial altar of the Agrippinensians)
- Constance (state of Baden-Württemberg; German: Konstanz) – Roman Emperor Constantius Chlorus

== D ==
- Dorotheenstadt (state of Berlin) – Duchess Sophia Dorothea of Holstein, electress consort of Frederick William, the "Great Elector" of Brandenburg (est. 1674, incorporated into Berlin on 1 January 1710)
- Dr.-Kurt-Fischer-Siedlung (State of Saxony) - Kurt Fischer (1900-1950), politician

== E ==
- Elisabeth-Sophien-Koog (state of Schleswig-Holstein) – Elisabeth Sophie Desmercières, wife of Jean Henri Desmercières, financier of the polder and dike constructions
- Erichsburg (state of Lower Saxony) – Eric II, Duke of Brunswick and Lunenburg, founded in the 16th century by his father Eric I, Duke of Brunswick and Lunenburg, who named it after his son.
- Erkelenz (state of North Rhine-Westphalia) – Roman real proprietor Herculentiacus
- Ernst-Braune-Siedlung (state of Saxony) - Ernst Braune (1853-1942), social democratic politician
- Ernst-Thälmann-Siedlung (state of Mecklenburg-Vorpommern) - Ernst Thälmann

== F ==
- Ferdinandshof (state of Mecklenburg-Hither Pomerania) – Prince Augustus Ferdinand of Prussia
- Findorf (state of Lower Saxony) – Jürgen Christian Findorff, Moor Commissioner in charge of drainage, cultivation and colonisation of moorlands (est. 1780, incorporated into Gnarrenburg in 1974)
- Franzburg (state of Mecklenburg-Hither Pomerania) – Francis, Duke of Brunswick and Lunenburg (Gifhorn line) (est. 1587 by Bogislaw XIII, Duke of Pomerania and named in honour of his father-in-law.)
- Friedrichsfelde (state of Berlin) – Prince-Elector Frederick III of Brandenburg (est. 13th century, incorporated into Berlin on 1 October 1920)
- Friedrichshafen (state of Baden-Württemberg) – King Frederick of Württemberg
- Friedrichshagen (state of Berlin) – King Frederick II, the "Great", of Prussia (est. 1753, incorporated into Berlin on 1 October 1920)
- Friedrichshain (state in Berlin) – King Frederick II, the "Great", of Prussia
- Friedrichskoog (state of Schleswig-Holstein) – King Frederick VII of Denmark
- Friedrichsruh (state of Schleswig-Holstein) – Count Frederick Charles Augustus of Lippe-Biesterfeld, Sternberg and Schwalenberg (est. 1763)
- Friedrichstadt (state of Schleswig-Holstein) – Frederick III, Duke of Holstein-Gottorp (est. 1621)
- Friedrichstadt (state of Berlin) – King Frederick I of Prussia (est. 1688, incorporated into Berlin on 1 January 1710)
- Friedrichsthal (state of Brandenburg) – King Frederick II, the "Great", of Prussia, now a component locality of Gartz
- Friedrichsthal (state of Brandenburg) – King Frederick I of Prussia, now a component locality of Oranienburg
- Friedrichsthal (state of Saarland) – Frederick Louis, Count of Nassau-Ottweiler (est. 1723)
- Friedrichswalde (state of Brandenburg) – King Frederick II, the "Great", of Prussia
- Friedrichswerder (state of Berlin) – Frederick William, the "Great Elector" of Brandenburg (est. 1662, incorporated into Berlin on 1 January 1710)
- Friedrich-Wilhelm-Lübke-Koog (state of Schleswig-Holstein) – Minister-President Friedrich-Wilhelm Lübke (in German) of Schleswig-Holstein
- Friedrich-Wilhelm-Stadt (state of Berlin) – King Frederick William III of Prussia (est. after 1710, a locality of Berlin from the beginning)

== G ==
- Galmsbüll/Danish: Galmesbøl/North Frisian: Galmsbel (state of Schleswig-Holstein) – Saint Gall (first mentioned in the 13th century)
- Georgensgmünd (state of Bavaria) – George the Martyr
- Georgenthal (state of Thuringia) – George the Martyr
- Georgsdorf (state of Lower Saxony) – George V of Hanover (est. 1775, named in 1890 in memory of the king)
- Georgsmarienhütte (state of Lower Saxony) – King George V of Hanover and Duchess Mary of Saxe-Altenburg, the queen consort
- Giesensdorf (state of Berlin) – a certain Ghiselbrecht, the locator (in German) (chief settler, who gathered interested colonists) in the 13th century (incorporated into Berlin on 1 October 1920)
- Gustavsburg (state of Hesse) – King Gustavus Adolphus of Sweden (est. 1632, merged into Ginsheim-Gustavsburg in 1808)
- Gropiusstadt (State of Berlin) - Walter Gropius

== H ==
- Hedwigenkoog (state of Schleswig-Holstein) – Hedvig Sophia of Sweden
- Heinrichswalde (state of Mecklenburg-Hither Pomerania) – Christoph Ludwig Henrici
- Hermsdorf (state of Berlin) – a certain Herman, the locator (in German) (chief settler, who gathered interested colonists) around 1200 (incorporated into Berlin on 1 October 1920)
- Hildesheim (state of Lower Saxony) – farmer Hildwin (landowner in the 10th century)

== J ==
- Joachimsthal in Brandenburg (state of Brandenburg) – Joachim Frederick, Elector of Brandenburg
- Johanngeorgenstadt (state of Saxony) – John George I, Elector of Saxony
- Johannisthal (state of Berlin) – Johann Wilhelm Werner, councillor of the electoral chamber (financial department), (est. 18th century, incorporated into Berlin on 1 October 1920)
- Juliers (state of North Rhine-Westphalia; Latin: Iuliacum, German: Jülich) – Julius Caesar
- Jürgensgaard/Jørgensgård (state of Schleswig-Holstein) – George the Martyr (incorporated into Flensburg in 1900.)
- Jürgenstorf (state of Mecklenburg-Hither Pomerania) – a certain Jürgen, the locator (in German) (chief settler, who gathered interested colonists) in the 13th century

== K ==
- Kaiser-Wilhelm-Koog (state of Schleswig-Holstein) – German Emperor Wilhelm I
- Karlsburg in Hither Pomerania (state of Mecklenburg-Hither Pomerania) – feudal landlord Carl von Bismarck
- Karlsruhe (state of Baden-Württemberg) – Margrave Charles III William, Margrave of Baden-Durlach
- Karolinenkoog (state of Schleswig-Holstein) – Princess Caroline of Denmark
- Kilianstädten (state of Hesse) – Irish Franconian apostle Saint Kilian (incorporated into today's Schöneck in Hesse in 1971)
- Kronprinzenkoog (state of Schleswig-Holstein) – Crown Prince Frederick of Denmark
- Kaiserslautern (state of Rhineland-Palatinate) Holy Roman Emperor Frederick I, Holy Roman Emperor

== L ==
- Leopoldshafen (state of Baden-Württemberg) – Leopold, Grand Duke of Baden (originally Schröck, first mentioned in 1160, renamed on 4 June 1833)
- Leopoldshagen (state of Mecklenburg-Hither Pomerania) – Leopold II, Prince of Anhalt-Dessau (est. 1748, named 1752)
- Leopoldshöhe (state of North Rhine-Westphalia) – Leopold II, Prince of Lippe
- Leverkusen (state of North Rhine-Westphalia) – pharmacist Carl Leverkus
- Ludwigsau (state of Hesse) – Louis I, Landgrave of Hesse
- Ludwigsburg (state of Baden-Württemberg) – Eberhard Ludwig, Duke of Württemberg
- Ludwigsfelde (state of Brandenburg) – Ernst Ludwig von der Gröben (1703–1773), president of the chamber (financial department) of Kurmark
- Ludwigshafen upon Lake Constance (state of Baden-Württemberg) – Louis I, Grand Duke of Baden
- Ludwigshafen upon Rhine (state of Rhineland-Palatinate) – King Ludwig I of Bavaria
- Ludwigshöhe in the Palatinate (state of Rhineland-Paltinate) – King Ludwig I of Bavaria
- Ludwigshöhe in Rhenish Hesse (state of Rhineland-Paltinate) – Louis I, Grand Duke of Hesse
- Ludwigslust (state of Mecklenburg-Hither Pomerania) – Duke Christian Louis II of Mecklenburg-Schwerin
- Ludwigsstadt (state of Bavaria) – a certain Ludewich, bailiff in 1269
- Luisenstadt (state of Berlin) – Duchess Louise of Mecklenburg-Strelitz, queen consort of King Frederick William III of Prussia (est. 16th century, incorporated into Berlin on 1 January 1710)
- Luisenthal (state of Thuringia) – Louise Dorothy of Saxe-Meiningen, duchess consort of Frederick III, Duke of Saxe-Gotha-Altenburg

== M ==
- Mariendorf (state of Berlin) – Mary of Nazareth (est. 13th century, incorporated into Berlin on 1 October 1920)
- Marienfelde (state of Berlin) – Mary of Nazareth (est. 13th century, incorporated into Berlin on 1 October 1920)
- Maxau (state of Baden-Württemberg) – Prince Maximilian of Baden (son of Charles Frederick, Grand Duke of Baden)
- Maxdorf (state of Rhineland-Palatinate) – King Maximilian I Joseph of Bavaria (est. mid-18th century, named after the king in 1819)
- Maxhafen (state of North Rhine-Westphalia) – Maximilian Frederick of Königsegg-Rothenfels, prince-archbishop-elector of Cologne, duke of Westphalia and prince-bishop of Münster (est. c. 1771, incorporated into Wettringen in the Münsterland)
- Maxhütte (state of Bavaria) – Maximilian II Joseph of Bavaria
- Maximiliansau (state of Rhineland-Palatinate) – Maximilian II Joseph of Bavaria (1858 a locality of Pfortz was named after the king, in 1938 the name of the locality was adopted for entire Pfortz, incorporated into the city of Wörth upon Rhine in 1979)
- Moritzburg (state of Saxony) – Maurice, Elector of Saxony

== N ==
- Neuhardenberg (state of Brandenburg) – chancellor Karl August von Hardenberg
- Neu Sankt Jürgen (state of Lower Saxony) – George the Martyr (incorporated into Worpswede in 1974)
- Nikolassee (state of Berlin) – Bishop Nicolas of Myra, (est. 1901, incorporated into Berlin on 1 October 1920)
- Nikolskoë (state of Berlin) – Tzar Nicholas I of Russia, (est. 1819, incorporated into Berlin on 1 October 1920)
- Nordgeorgsfehn (state of Lower Saxony) – George IV, King of Hanover and the United Kingdom (est. 1825, incorporated into Uplengen in 1973)

== O ==
- Oederquart (state of Lower Saxony) – a certain Oderick, the locator (in German) (chief settler, who gathered interested colonists) in the 12th century
- Oranienbaum (state of Saxony-Anhalt) – Princess Henriette Catherina of Orange-Nassau, princess consort of John George II, Prince of Anhalt-Dessau
- Oranienburg (state of Brandenburg) – Princess Luise Henriette of Orange-Nassau, electress consort of Frederick William, the "Great Elector" of Brandenburg
- Ottobrunn (state of Bavaria) – Othon, King of the Hellenes
- Otto-Suhr-Siedlung (State of Berlin) - Otto Suhr (1894-1957), Mayor of Berlin

== P ==
- Paulinenaue (state of Brandenburg) – Pauline von Bardeleben (1811–1884), bride of the patrimonial landlord Friedrich Wilhelm von Knoblauch (1798–1852)
- Philippinenburg (state of Hesse) – Margravine Philippine of Brandenburg-Schwedt, second wife of Frederick II, Landgrave of Hesse-Cassel (est. 1778, incorporated into Wolfhagen in 1971)
- Philippinendorf (state of Hesse) – Margravine Philippine of Brandenburg-Schwedt, second wife of Frederick II, Landgrave of Hesse-Cassel (est. 1778, incorporated into Wolfhagen in 1971)
- Philippinenthal (state of Hesse) – Margravine Philippine of Brandenburg-Schwedt, second wife of Frederick II, Landgrave of Hesse-Cassel (est. 1778, incorporated into Wolfhagen in 1971)
- Philippsburg (state of Baden-Württemberg) – Prince-Bishop Philipp Christoph von Sötern, Prince-Bishopric of Speyer
- Philippsthal upon Werra (state of Hesse) – Philip, Landgrave of Hesse-Philippsthal
- Pirmasens (state of Rhineland-Palatinate) – monk Pirminius

== R ==
- Ratzeburg (state of Schleswig-Holstein) – Prince Ratibor (11th century)
- Reinickendorf (state of Berlin) – a certain Reineke, the locator (in German) (chief settler, who gathered interested colonists) in the 13th century (incorporated into Berlin on 1 October 1920)
- Reußenköge (state of Schleswig-Holstein) – Count Heinrich XLIII of Reuß-Schleiz-Köstritz and his wife Louise, who financed the polders
- Rixdorf (Richardsdorf) (state of Berlin) – an unknown historical Richard, probably of the early 13th to 14th century, possibly a local Knight Templar, bailiff or commander of the Tempelhof commandery, or even the original administrator or chief settler (Lokator), or a prominent historical person like Richard of Chichester, Richard of Cornwall or Richard de Bures (incorporated into Berlin on 1 October 1920 as part of Neukölln)
- Röntgental (state of Brandenburg) – physicist Wilhelm Röntgen, inventor of the X-ray

== S ==
- Saarlouis (state of Saarland) – King Louis XIV of France
- Sankt Augustin (state of North Rhine-Westphalia) – Augustine of Hippo
- Sankt Pauli (state of Hamburg) – (Saul) Paul of Tarsos
- Schmargendorf (state of Berlin; antiq. (de)s Margreven Dorp, Smargendorp, lit. the Margrave's Village) – Margrave John I of Brandenburg, (est. in the 13th century, incorporated into Berlin on 1 October 1920)
- Schrötersdorf (state of Lower Saxony) – astronomer Johann Hieronymus Schröter (est. 1805, incorporated into Lilienthal in 1974)
- Siemensstadt (state of Berlin) – engineer Werner von Siemens (est. 1899, incorporated into Berlin on 1 October 1920)
- Südgeorgsfehn (state of Lower Saxony) – King George IV of Hanover and the United Kingdom (est. 1825, incorporated into Uplengen in 1973)

== T ==
- Trier (state of Rhineland-Palatinate; Latin: Augusta Treverorum) – Augustus (lit. City of Augustus in the lands of the Treveri people)

== U ==
- Ulrichshusen (state of Mecklenburg-Hither Pomerania) – feudal landlord Ulrich von Moltzan (now a part of Schwinkendorf)

== V ==
- Veitshöchheim (state of Bavaria) – Vitus
- Viereck (state of Mecklenburg-Hither Pomerania) – Adam Otto von Viereck, Prussian state minister in charge of colonists in the monarchy (est. in 1748, renamed in 1751)

== W ==
- Waldensberg (state of Hesse) – merchant Peter Waldo, precursor of the Protestant Reformers (est. 1699, incorporated into Wächtersbach in 1971)
- Wedding (state of Berlin) – feudal landlord Rudolf de Weddinge (est. 13th century, incorporated into Berlin in 1861)
- Wilhelmsburg (state of Hamburg) – Duke George William of Brunswick and Lunenburg, Prince of Lüneburg (est. 1672, incorporated into Harburg-Wilhelmsburg in 1927)
- Wilhelmsdorf in Middle Franconia (state of Bavaria) – George William, Margrave of Brandenburg-Bayreuth
- Wilhelmsdorf upon Saale (state of Thuringia) – a certain Wilhelm, probably the locator (in German) (chief settler, who gathered interested colonists) in the 14th century
- Wilhelmsdorf in Württemberg (state of Baden-Württemberg) – King William I of Württemberg
- Wilhelmshaven (state of Lower Saxony) – King Wilhelm I of Prussia, later also German Emperor (lit. William's harbour)
- Wilmersdorf (state of Berlin) – a certain Wilhelm, probably the locator (in German) (chief settler, who gathered interested colonists) in the 13th century (incorporated into Berlin on 1 October 1920)
- Wittenau (state of Berlin) – mayor Peter Witte, (est. 14th century, incorporated into Berlin on 1 October 1920)

== Z ==
- Zeppelinheim (state of Hesse) – Count Ferdinand von Zeppelin (est. 1 January 1938, incorporated into Neu-Isenburg in 1977.)

== Former names ==
- Horst-Wessel-Stadt (locality of Berlin) was the name of Berlin-Friedrichshain from 1933 to 1945 – Horst Wessel
- Karl-Marx-Stadt (state of Saxony) was the name of Chemnitz from 1953 to 1990 – Karl Marx
- Katharinenthal (state of Hesse) was the name of Wilhelmsthal from 1807 to 1813 – Catharina of Württemberg, Queen consort of Westphalia
- Maczków (state of Lower Saxony) was the name of Haren upon Ems between 4 June 1945 and 10 September 1948 – Stanisław Maczek
- Marxwalde (state of Brandenburg) was the name of Neuhardenberg from 1949 to 1990 – Karl Marx
- Napoléonshöhe (state of Hesse) was the name of Bad Wilhelmshöhe (a quarter of today's Cassel) – Napoleon I of France
- Pottsfehn (state of Lower Saxony) was the name of Hüllenerfehn (since 1973 a part of Ihlow in East Frisia) – Rudolf Pott, founder
- Stalinstadt (state of Brandenburg) was the name of Eisenhüttenstadt from 1953 to 1961 – Joseph Stalin

== See also ==
- List of places named after people
  - List of country subdivisions named after people
  - List of islands named after people
- Buildings and structures named after people
  - List of eponyms of airports
  - List of convention centers named after people
  - List of railway stations named after people
- Lists of places by eponym
- List of eponyms
- Lists of etymologies
