= Cologne Lowland =

Area of Germany

Coordinates: 50.9381°N 6.9569°E

The Cologne Lowland, also called the Cologne Bay or, less commonly, the Cologne Bight (German: Kölner Bucht, pronounced [ˈkœlnɐ ˈbʊxt]), is a densely populated area of Germany lying between the cities of Bonn, Aachen, and Düsseldorf/Neuss. It is situated in the southwest of the state of North Rhine-Westphalia and forms the natural southern conclusion of the Lower Rhenish lowlands and the transition to the Rhenish Massif (Rheinische Schiefergebirge or "Rhenish Slate Mountains").

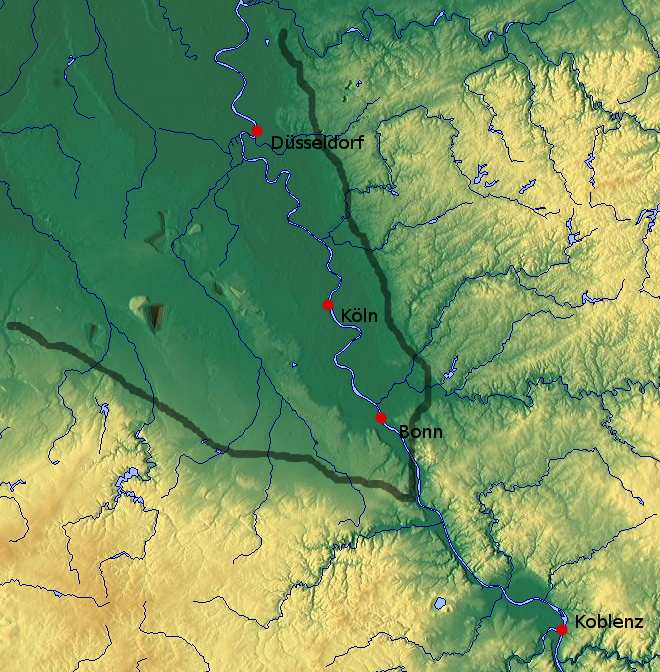
Map of the Cologne Lowland showing its "bight" shape

The Cologne Bight is surrounded by the High Fens and the Eifel to the west of the Rhine and by the uplands of Bergisches Land to the east of the Rhine. In the south and southeast the rising Rhine Massif, visible from far off by the silhouette of the Siebengebirge, surround the head of the bight at Königswinter. To the northwest the Cologne Bight opens out into the valleys of the Rhine and the Meuse, in the northeast it is bounded by the Münsterländer Kreidebecken (Münster Chalk Basin) of the Westphalian Bight.

== Climate and geology ==
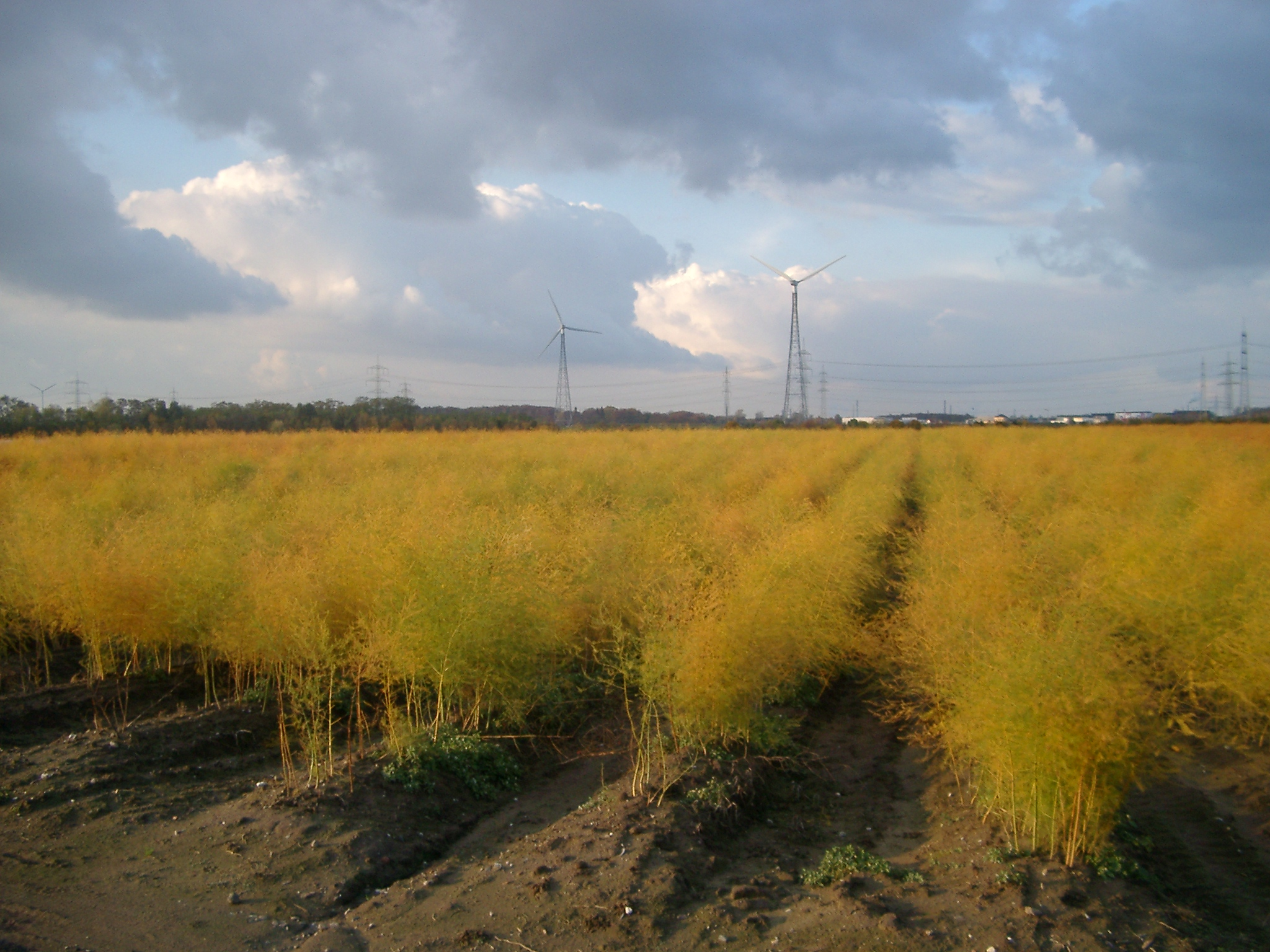
Asparagus field near Sechtem

The Cologne Lowland is among the warmest regions in Germany. While the summers on the upper Rhine are somewhat warmer, winters in the area are so mild that snow remaining on the ground for as much as several days would have been considered rather exceptional in the decades before the onset of the current climatic change. Due to the orographic rainfall on the surrounding mountain ranges the climate is relatively damp as well. In combination with the valuable loess soil, these factors make the Cologne Bight one of the most fertile regions of Germany.

About 30 million years ago, parts of the Rhine Massif sank and formed a lowland region. Due to the subtropical climate at that time, there was a luxuriant plant growth of abundant varieties. About 15 million years ago, these plants died out and formed a peat layer up to 270 metres thick. From the pressure of earth layers lying over it, the peat was compressed into lignite (brown coal).

The predecessor rivers of today's Rhine dug a broad river bed through the rock. These Rhine forerunners brought debris from the Alps, the Eifel, the Hunsrück, and the Westerwald. Where the water flowed slowly (in the shallow water zones), clay was left behind; where it flowed fast, sand and gravel settled. The shores of the North Sea in those days occasionally reached up to where the cities of Aachen, Erkelenz, and Mönchengladbach are today.

The Cologne Lowland is also seismically active today.

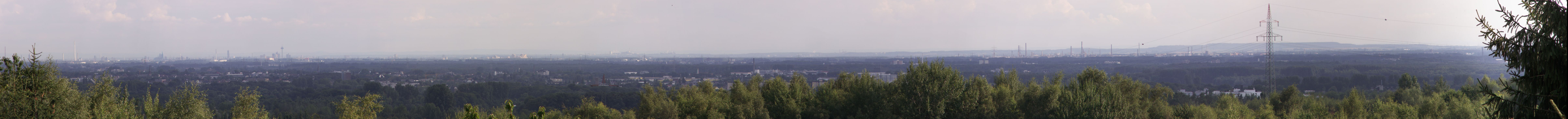
Part of the Cologne Lowland seen from the north

The region is characterised by its agriculture (with orchards and truck farms), by open-pit lignite mining, by the landscapes of the Voreifel and the Bergisches Land as well as by 325 fortresses and castles, which were usually built as water castles.

== See also ==
List of places in North Rhine-Westphalia

== Bibliography ==
- Brune, Bert, and Hans Bender. 1990. Kölner Bucht: Natur und Unnatur—ein Lesebuch, edited by Bert Brune and Frieder Döring, with drawings by Karl Peters. Cologne: Wolkenstein-Verlag. ISBN 3-927861-08-1
- Dickinson, Robert Eric. 1953. Germany: A General and Regional Geography. Methuen's Advanced Geographies; Dutton Advanced Geographies. London: Methuen; New York: Dutton. (Second edition, London: Methuen; New York: Dutton, 1961)
- Elkins, T. H. 1968. Germany: An Introductory Geography, revised edition. Praeger Introductory Geographies. London: Chatto & Windus; New York: Praeger. ISBN 0-7010-0087-2 (Third edition, London: Chatto & Windus, 1972. ISBN 0-7011-0651-4)
- Friedrich, Reinhard and Bernd Päffgen. 2007. Mittelalterliche Burganlagen in Kölner Bucht und Nordeifel bis zum Ende des 13. Jahrhunderts. Publikationen der Gesellschaft für Rheinische Geschichtskunde, neue Folge 12, Abt. 1b. Bonn: Habelt-Verlag. ISBN 3-7749-3434-7
- Krämer, Karl Emerich and Eva Umscheid. 1988. Von Burg zu Burg zwischen Köln und Aachen, 2nd expanded edition. Duisburg: Mercator-Verlag. ISBN 3-87463-117-6
- Schamp, Elke W. (ed.). 1972. Kölner Bucht und angrenzende Gebiete, edited and collected by members of the Geographical and Business and Social-geographical Institutes of the University of Cologne. Sammlung geographischer Führer 6. Berlin and Stuttgart: Borntraeger.
