= List of places in North Rhine-Westphalia =

This is a list of geographical features in the state of North Rhine-Westphalia, Germany.

== Mountains ==
- Eifel
- Sauerland
- Teutoburg Forest
- Weser Uplands
- Westerwald
- Wiehen Hills

== Rivers ==
- Eder
- Ems
- Ennepe
- Erft
- Lenne
- Lippe
- Rhine
- Ruhr
- Sieg
- Weser
- Wupper

== Regions ==
- Cologne Bight
- Neanderthal
- Ostwestfalen-Lippe
- Porta Westfalica
- Rhine-Ruhr
- Ruhr area
- Rhineland
- Westphalia

== Cities ==
see List of cities in Germany and List of cities in North Rhine-Westphalia by population
