= List of places in Saarland =

This is a list of geographical features in the state of Saarland, Germany.

== Rivers ==
- Moselle
- Saar

== Lakes ==
- Bostalsee
- Losheimer Stausee

== Cities ==
see List of cities in Germany.
