= Galmsbüll =

Galmsbüll Galmsbøl
- Municipality
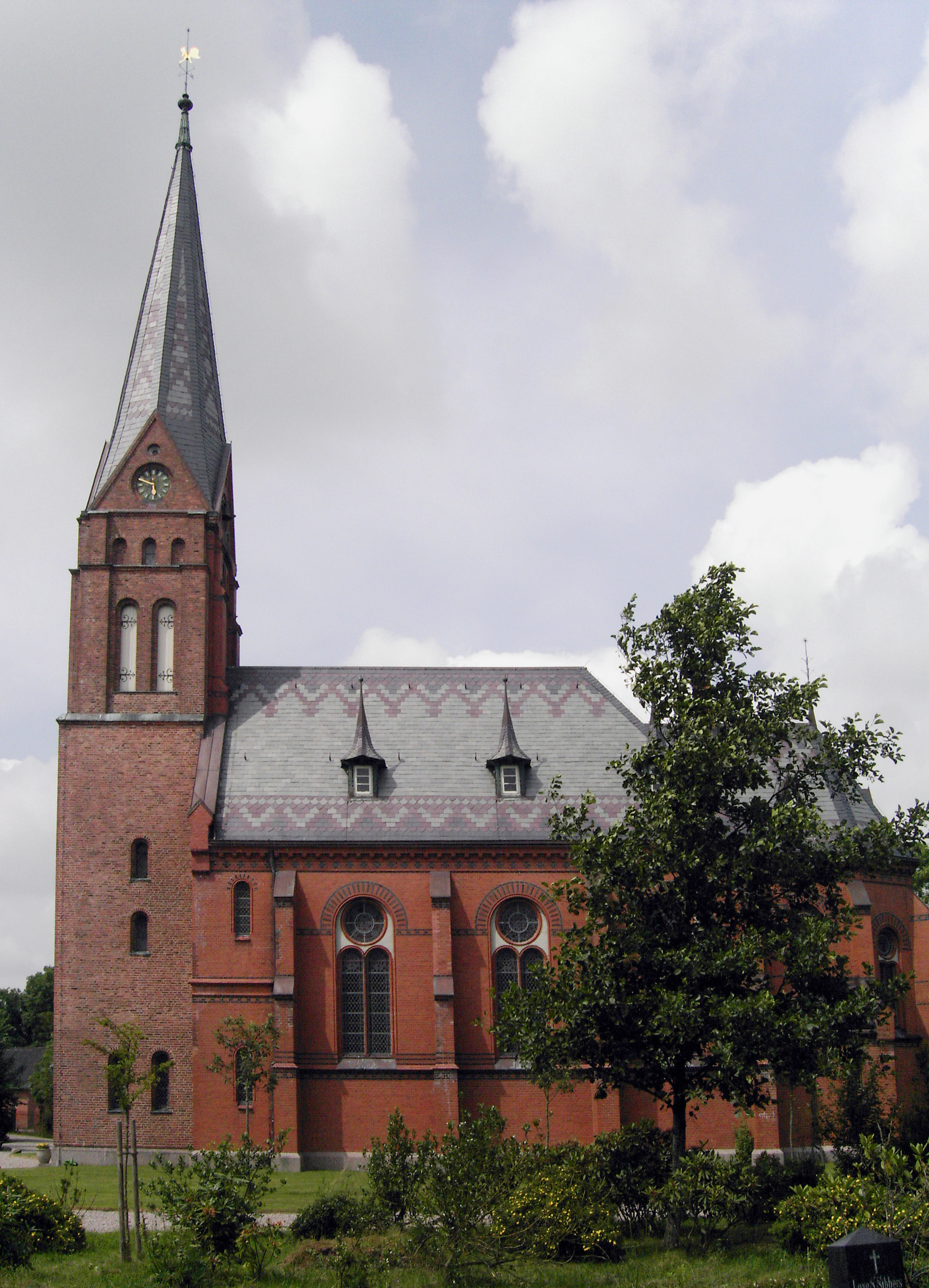
- St. Gallus church

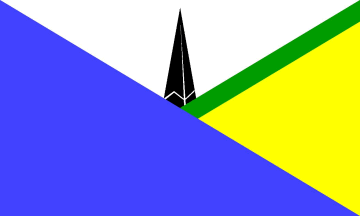
- Flag Coat of arms

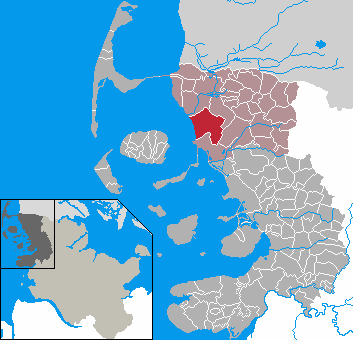
- Location of Galmsbüll; Galmsbøl within Nordfriesland district
- Interactive map of Galmsbüll; Galmsbøl
- Location within Germany Location within Schleswig-Holstein
- Coordinates: 54°45′N 8°45′E
- Country: Germany
- State: Schleswig-Holstein
- District: Nordfriesland
- Municipal assoc.: Südtondern

Government
  - Mayor: Sinje Stein

Area
  - Total: 49.05 km^{2} (18.94 sq mi)
- Elevation: 2 m (6.6 ft)

Population (2025-12-31)
  - Total: 555
  - Density: 11.3/km^{2} (29.3/sq mi)
- Time zone: UTC+01:00 (CET)
  - Summer (DST): UTC+02:00 (CEST)
- Postal codes: 25899
- Dialling codes: 04665, 04667, 04661
- Vehicle registration: NF
- Website: www.amt- boekingharde.de

Galmsbüll (North Frisian: Galmsbel, Danish: Galmesbøl) is a municipality in the district of Nordfriesland, in Schleswig-Holstein, Germany.
