= List of places in Mecklenburg-Vorpommern =

This is a list of geographical features in the state of Mecklenburg-Vorpommern, Germany.

== Cities ==
see List of cities in Mecklenburg-Vorpommern

== Rivers ==
- Peene
- Warnow
- Tollense

== Lakes ==
- Müritz Lake
- Schweriner See

== Islands ==
- Hiddensee
- Poel
- Rügen
- Ummanz
- Usedom

== Miscellaneous ==
- Darß
- Mecklenburg
- Müritz National Park
- Vorpommern
- Western Pomerania Lagoon Area National Park
