= List of places in Thuringia =

This is a list of geographical features in the state of Thuringia, Germany.

== Mountains ==
- Harz
- Rhön
- Thuringian Forest

== Rivers ==
- Gera (through Arnstadt and Erfurt)
- Ilm (through Ilmenau and Weimar)
- Leine (through Leinefelde-Worbis and Heiligenstadt)
- Pleiße (through Altenburg)
- Saale (through Saalfeld, Rudolstadt and Jena)
- Sprotte (through Schmölln)
- Unstrut (through Mühlhausen, Bad Langensalza and Sömmerda)
- White Elster (through Greiz and Gera)
- Werra (through Hildburghausen, Meiningen and Bad Salzungen)
- Wipper (through Sondershausen)

== Miscellaneous ==
- Eichsfeld
- Hainich National Park

== Cities and towns ==
see List of towns in Thuringia
