= List of places named for Israel Putnam =

This is a list of places named for Israel Putnam, a major general in the Continental Army who fought at the Battle of Bunker Hill.

- Putnam, Connecticut
- Putnam County, Georgia
- Putnam County, Illinois
- Putnam County, Indiana
- Putnam County, Missouri
- Putnam County, New York
- Putnam, New York (town)
- Putnam County, Ohio (some sources say it was named for his cousin Rufus Putnam)
- Putnam County, Tennessee
- Putnam County, West Virginia
