= List of places in Baden-Württemberg =

This is a list of geographical features in the state of Baden-Württemberg, Germany.

== Mountains ==
- Black Forest (including Feldberg)
- Odenwald
- Spessart
- Swabian Alb

== Rivers ==
- Danube
- Iller
- Main
- Neckar
- Rhine
- Tauber

== Lakes ==
- Lake Constance

== Miscellaneous ==
- Aachtopf
- Mainau

== Cities ==
see List of cities in Germany
