= List of places in Rhineland-Palatinate =

This is a list of geographical features in the state of Rhineland-Palatinate, Germany.

== Mountains ==
- Eifel
- Hunsrück
- Palatinate Forest
- Taunus
- Westerwald

== Rivers ==
See list

== Lakes ==
- Franzosenwoog
- Laacher See
- Wiesensee

== Castles ==
See list

== Miscellaneous ==
- Palatinate

== Cities ==
See List of cities in Germany
