= List of cities in North Rhine-Westphalia by population =

The following list sorts all cities in the German state of North Rhine-Westphalia with a population of more than 50,000. As of 15 May 2022, 76 cities fulfill this criterion and are listed here. This list refers only to the population of individual municipalities within their defined limits, which does not include other municipalities or suburban areas within urban agglomerations.

== List ==
Largest cities in North Rhine-Westphalia

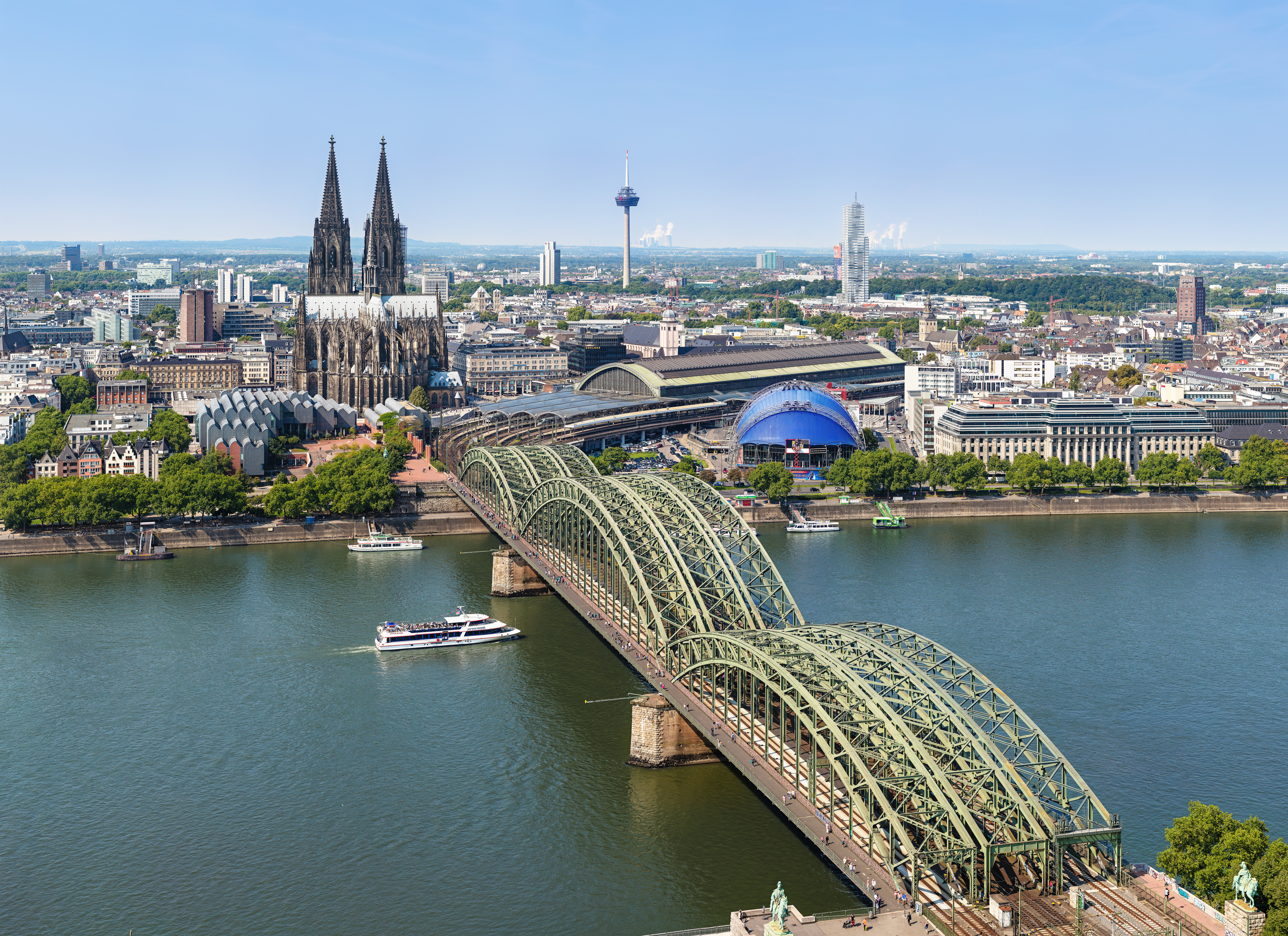
Cologne

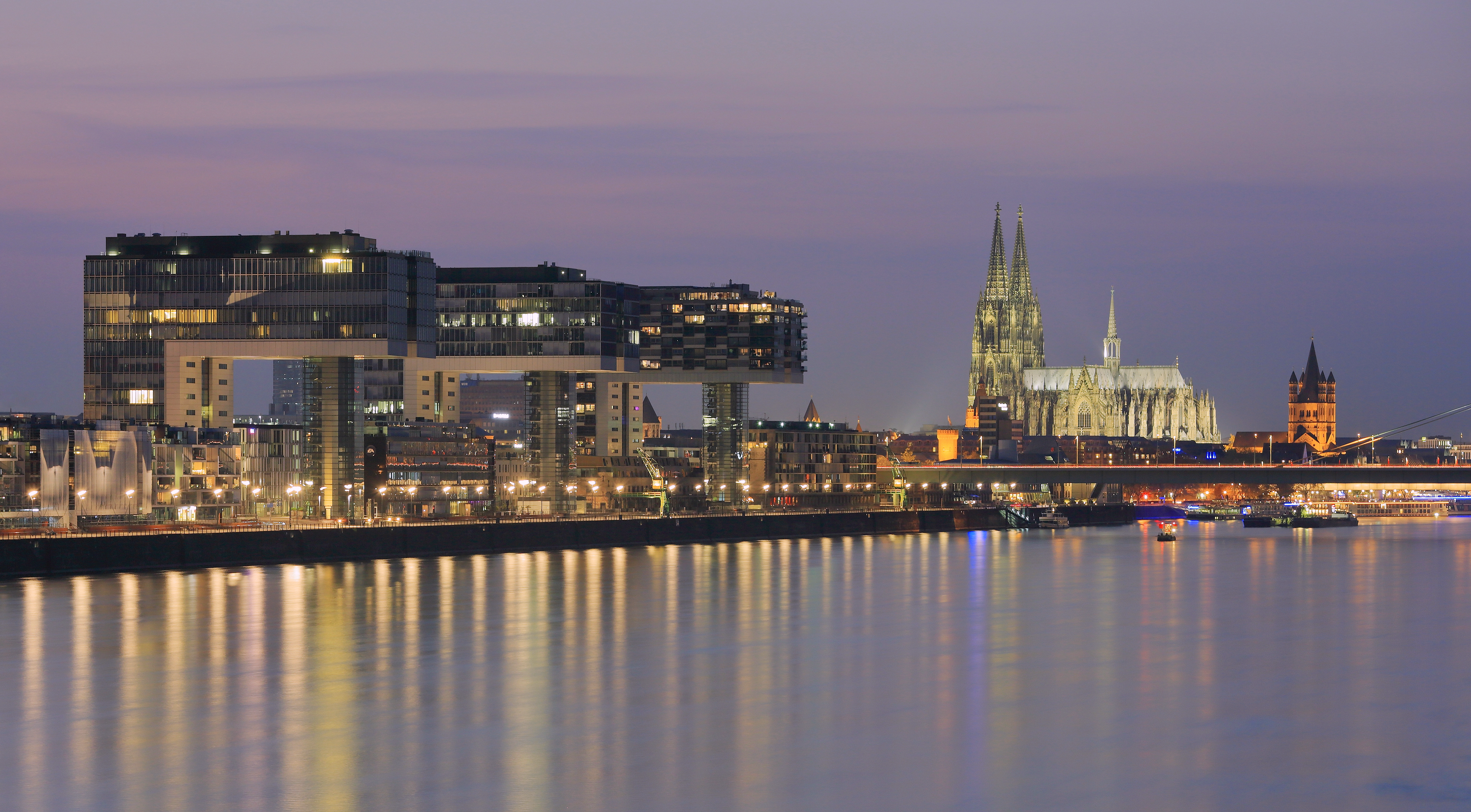
Cologne

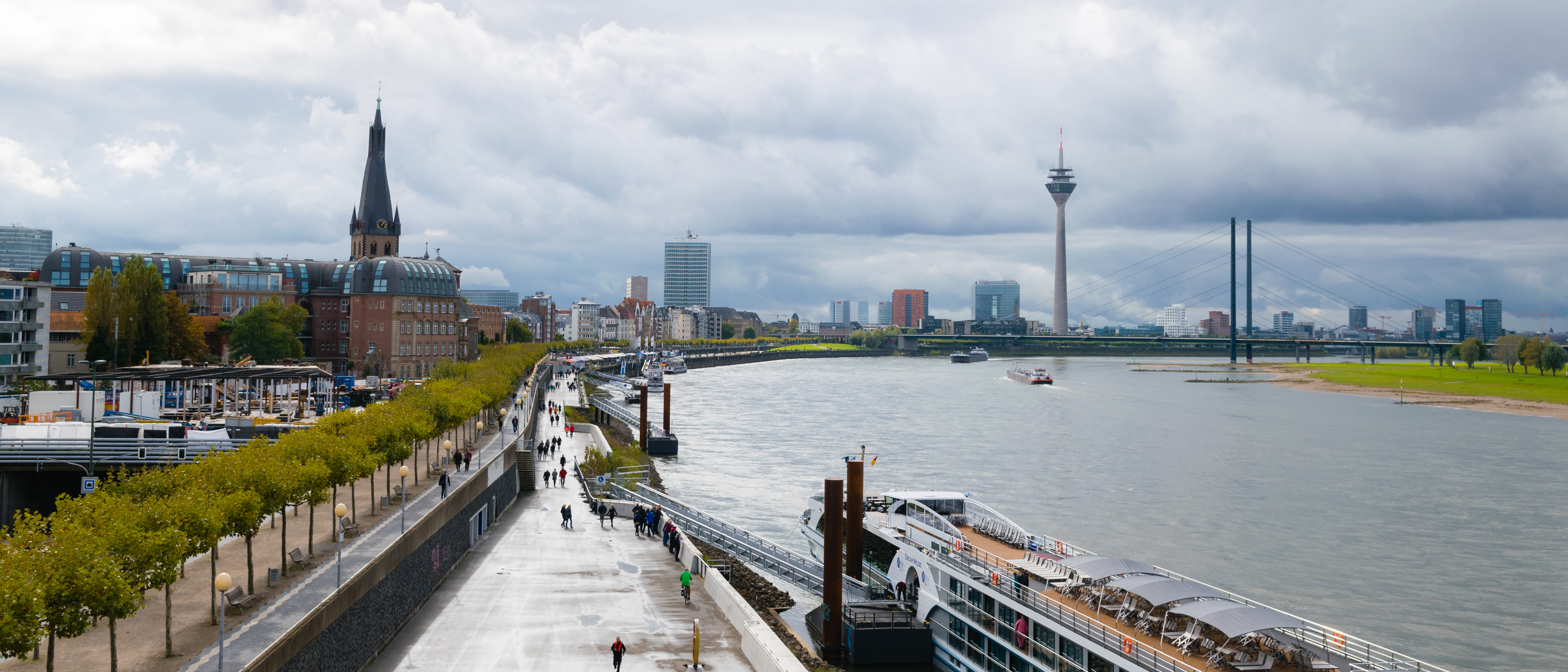
Düsseldorf

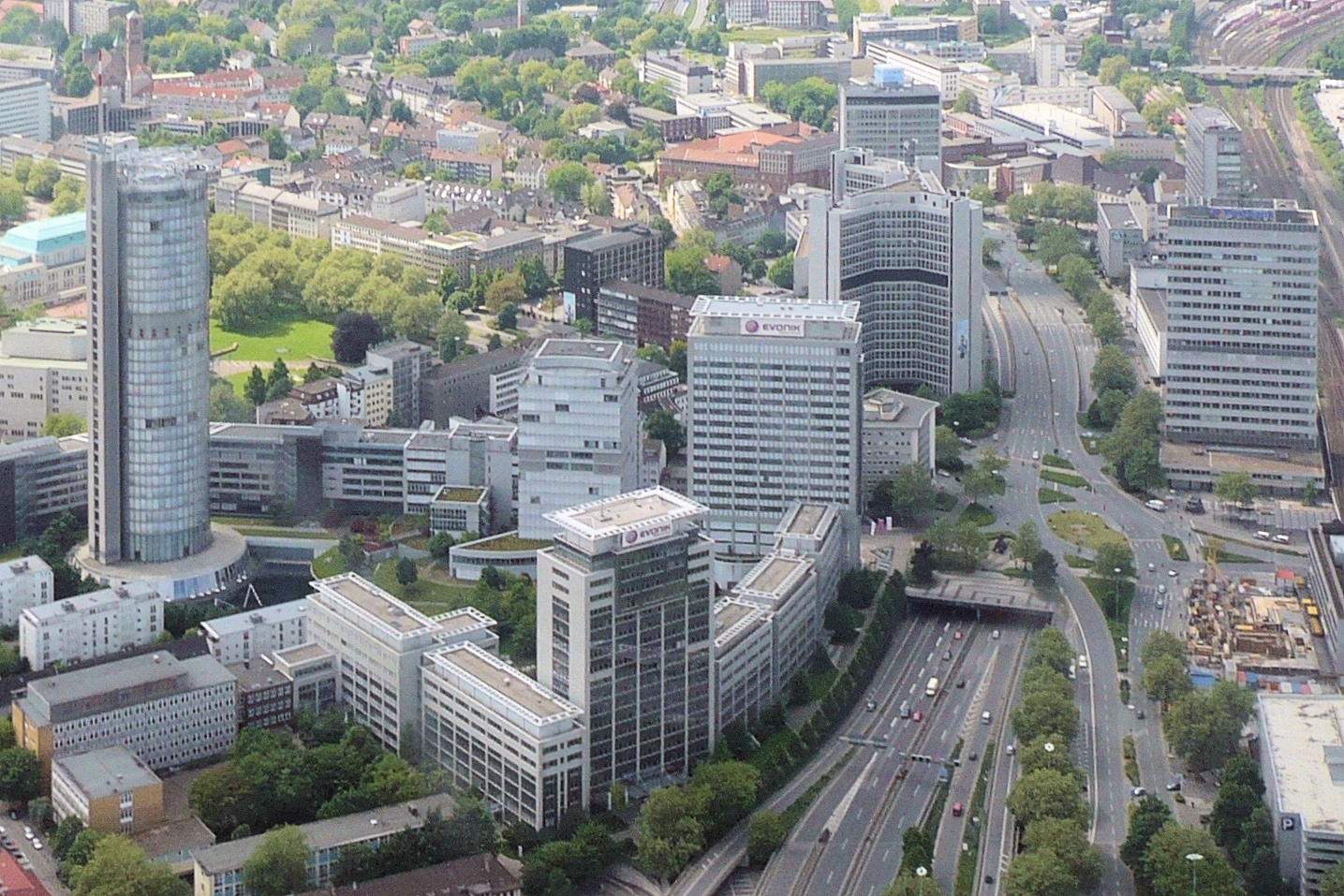
Essen

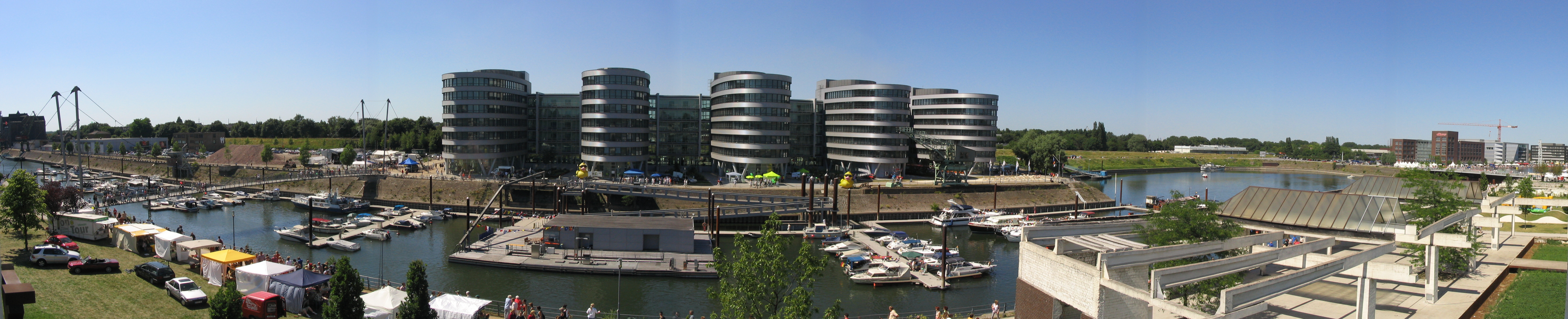
Duisburg

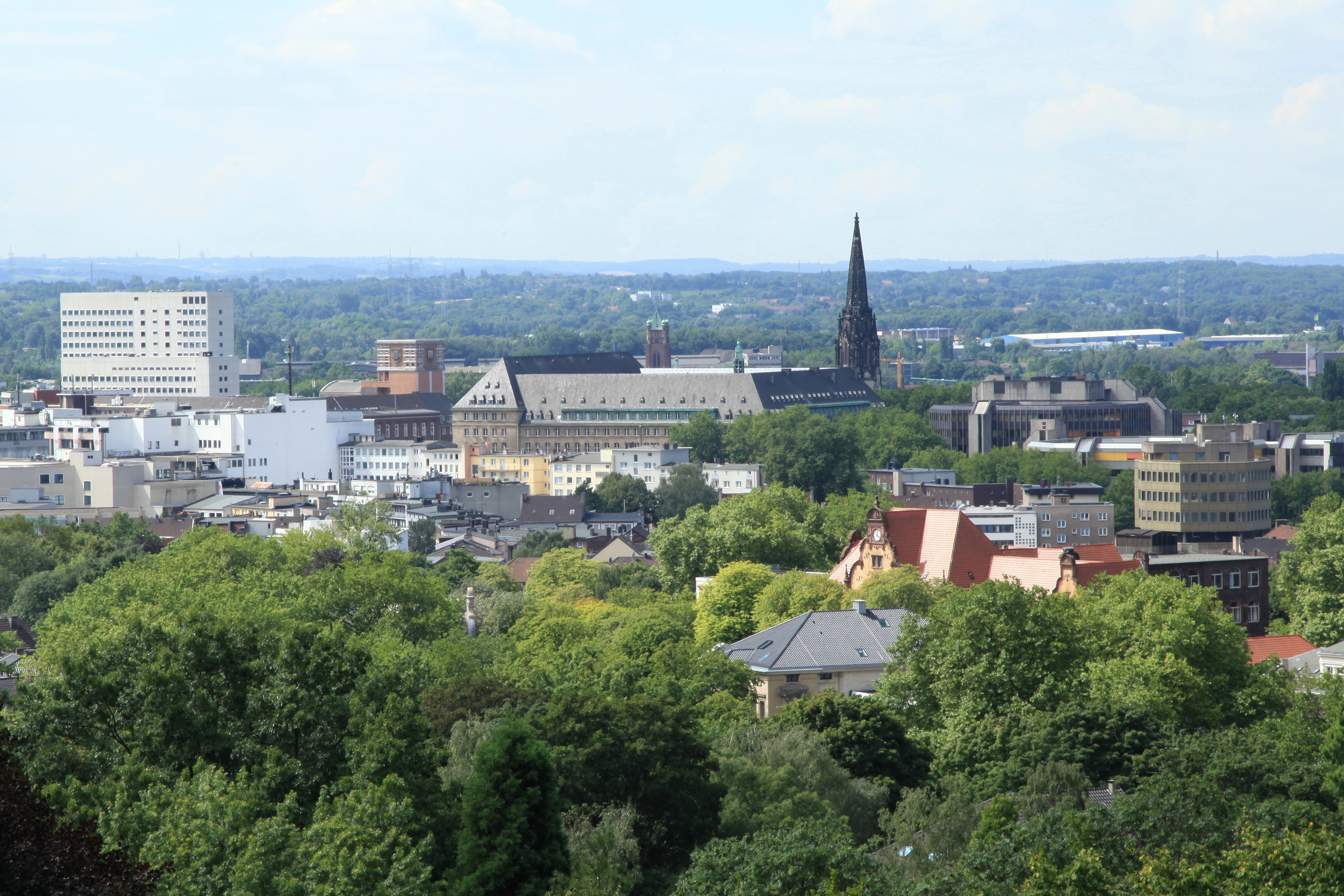
Bochum

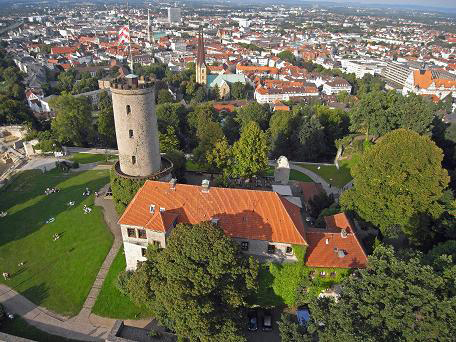
Bielefeld

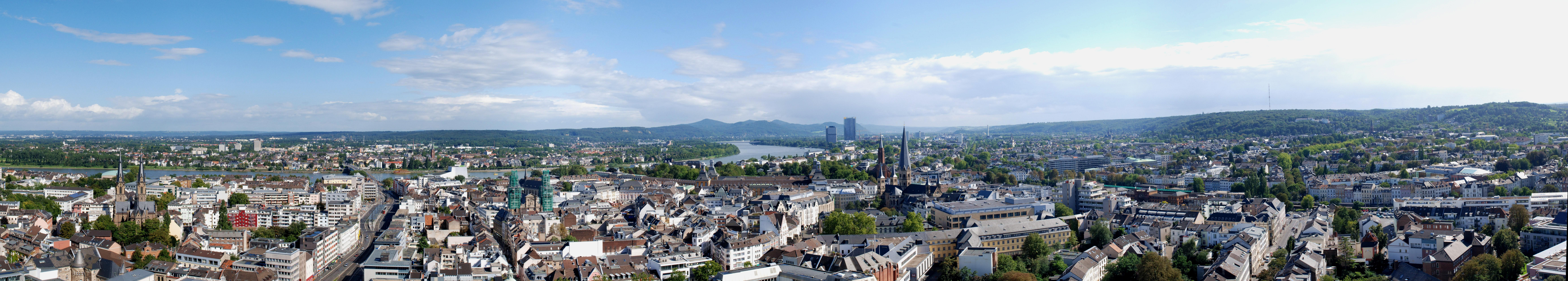
Bonn

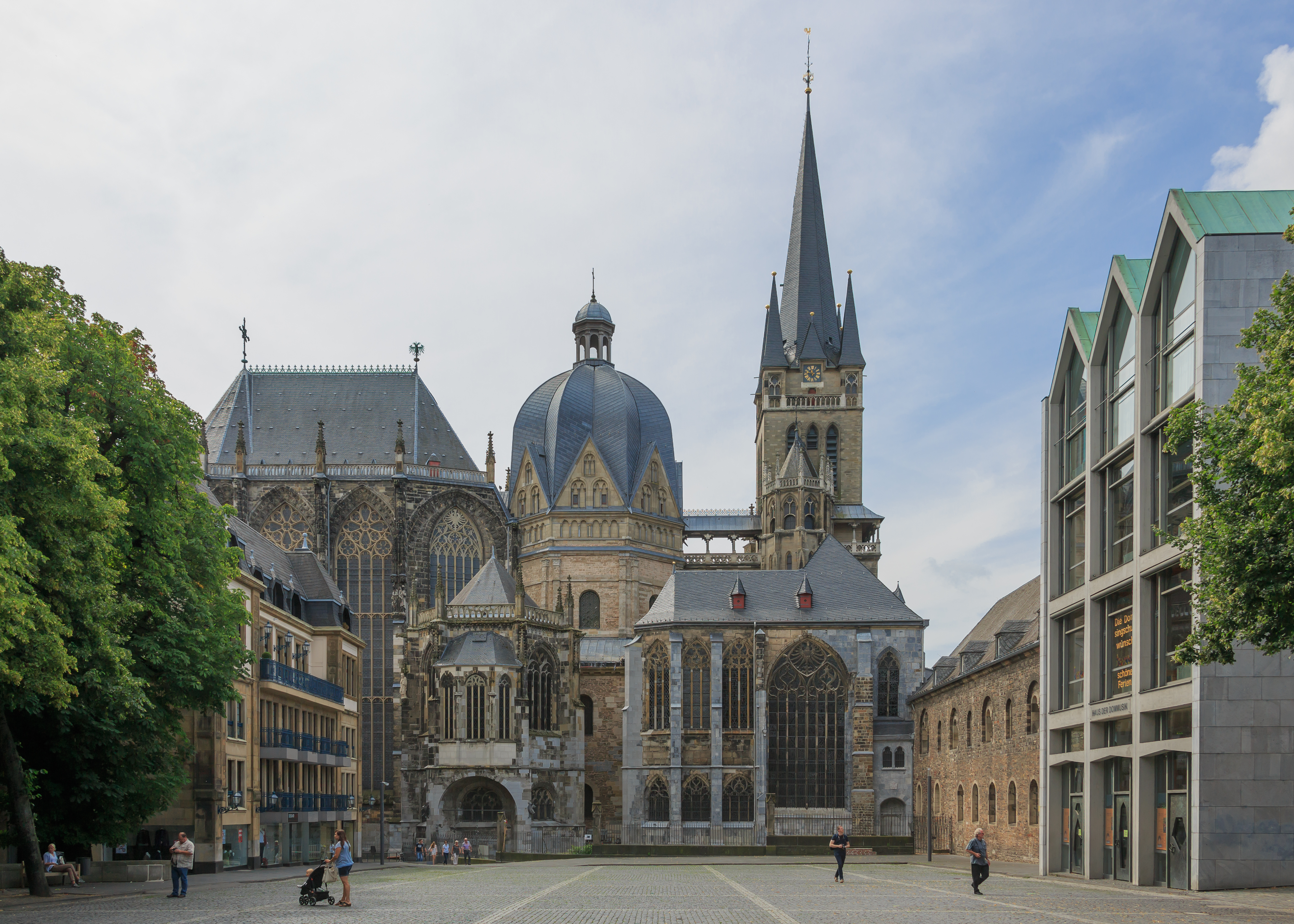
Aachen

The following table lists the 76 cities in North Rhine Westphalia with a population of at least 50,000 on 15 May 2022, as estimated by the Federal Statistical Office of Germany. A city is displayed in bold if it is a state or federal capital.

1. The city rank by population
2. The city name
3. The name of the district (Landkreis) in which the city lies (some cities are districts on their own called urban districts)
4. The city population as of 15 May 2022, as estimated by the Federal Statistical Office of Germany
5. The city population as of 9 May 2011, as enumerated by the 2011 European Union census
6. The city land area as of 15 May 2022
7. The city population density as of 15 May 2022 (residents per unit of land area)
8. Yearly population growth between 2011 and 2022

2022 rank	City	District	2022 census	2011 census	2022 land area	2022 pop. density	Annual growth (2011–2022)
1	Cologne	urban district	1,017,355	1,005,775	405 km²	2,512/km²	0.10%
2	**Düsseldorf**	urban district	611,258	586,291	217 km²	2,812/km²	0.38%
3	Dortmund	urban district	598,246	571,143	281 km²	2,131/km²	0.42%
4	Essen	urban district	571,039	566,201	210 km²	2,715/km²	0.08%
5	Duisburg	urban district	501,415	488,468	233 km²	2,154/km²	0.24%
6	Wuppertal	urban district	356,768	342,661	168 km²	2,119/km²	0.37%
7	Bochum	urban district	354,288	362,286	146 km²	2,432/km²	-0.20%
8	Bielefeld	urban district	330,072	326,870	259 km²	1,275/km²	0.09%
9	Bonn	urban district	321,544	305,765	141 km²	2,279/km²	0.46%
10	Münster	urban district	303,772	289,576	303 km²	1,002/km²	0.44%
11	Gelsenkirchen	urban district	264,130	258,766	105 km²	2,517/km²	0.19%
12	Mönchengladbach	urban district	264,089	255,188	170 km²	1,549/km²	0.31%
13	Aachen	Aachen	261,178	236,420	161 km²	1,624/km²	0.91%
14	Krefeld	urban district	230,666	222,247	138 km²	1,674/km²	0.34%
15	Oberhausen	urban district	212,127	210,216	77.1 km²	2,752/km²	0.08%
16	Hagen	urban district	189,614	187,944	160 km²	1,182/km²	0.08%
17	Hamm	urban district	179,070	176,037	226 km²	790.9/km²	0.16%
18	Mülheim an der Ruhr	urban district	171,435	166,865	91.3 km²	1,878/km²	0.25%
19	Leverkusen	urban district	166,356	158,984	78.9 km²	2,109/km²	0.41%
20	Solingen	urban district	164,621	155,265	89.5 km²	1,839/km²	0.53%
21	Paderborn	Paderborn	155,516	142,365	180 km²	866.0/km²	0.81%
22	Herne	urban district	155,446	155,160	51.4 km²	3,023/km²	0.02%
23	Neuss	Rhein-Kreis Neuss	153,079	150,568	99.5 km²	1,538/km²	0.15%
24	Bottrop	urban district	117,921	117,311	101 km²	1,172/km²	0.05%
25	Recklinghausen	Recklinghausen	115,216	115,958	66.5 km²	1,733/km²	-0.06%
26	Remscheid	urban district	113,743	110,708	74.5 km²	1,526/km²	0.25%
27	Bergisch Gladbach	Rheinisch-Bergischer Kreis	110,898	108,878	83.1 km²	1,335/km²	0.17%
28	Siegen	Siegen-Wittgenstein	102,275	99,187	115 km²	891.8/km²	0.28%
29	Moers	Wesel	100,465	104,009	67.7 km²	1,484/km²	-0.31%
30	Gütersloh	Gütersloh	99,344	94,172	112 km²	886.8/km²	0.49%
31	Düren	Düren	94,149	88,789	85.0 km²	1,108/km²	0.53%
32	Iserlohn	Märkischer Kreis	91,941	94,630	125 km²	732.7/km²	-0.26%
33	Witten	Ennepe-Ruhr-Kreis	91,735	96,382	72.4 km²	1,267/km²	-0.45%
34	Ratingen	Mettmann	88,425	86,967	88.7 km²	996.5/km²	0.15%
35	Marl	Recklinghausen	85,684	84,782	87.8 km²	976.5/km²	0.10%
36	Lünen	Unna	85,234	86,010	59.4 km²	1,435/km²	-0.08%
37	Minden	Minden-Lübbecke	83,743	80,121	101 km²	828.2/km²	0.40%
38	Velbert	Mettmann	82,319	81,303	74.9 km²	1,099/km²	0.11%
39	Rheine	Steinfurt	76,344	72,749	145 km²	526.5/km²	0.44%
40	Viersen	Viersen	76,146	74,941	91.1 km²	835.9/km²	0.14%
41	Gladbeck	Recklinghausen	75,515	73,974	36.0 km²	2,100/km²	0.19%
42	Troisdorf	Rhein-Sieg-Kreis	75,335	72,408	62.0 km²	1,215/km²	0.36%
43	Arnsberg	Hochsauerlandkreis	74,861	74,383	194 km²	386.4/km²	0.06%
44	Detmold	Lippe	74,486	73,743	129 km²	575.7/km²	0.09%
45	Dorsten	Recklinghausen	74,257	76,860	171 km²	433.5/km²	-0.31%
46	Castrop-Rauxel	Recklinghausen	72,839	74,629	51.7 km²	1,409/km²	-0.22%
47	Bocholt	Borken	71,985	71,256	119 km²	602.9/km²	0.09%
48	Lüdenscheid	Märkischer Kreis	71,688	73,762	87.0 km²	823.8/km²	-0.26%
49	Lippstadt	Soest	68,100	65,886	114 km²	599.0/km²	0.30%
50	Herford	Herford	66,985	65,213	79.2 km²	846.3/km²	0.24%
51	Dinslaken	Wesel	66,606	67,853	47.7 km²	1,398/km²	-0.17%
52	Kerpen	Rhein-Erft-Kreis	65,763	63,273	114 km²	577.1/km²	0.35%
53	Grevenbroich	Rhein-Kreis Neuss	65,230	61,741	102 km²	636.9/km²	0.50%
54	Dormagen	Rhein-Kreis Neuss	64,259	62,208	85.5 km²	751.6/km²	0.29%
55	Bergheim	Rhein-Erft-Kreis	61,449	58,922	96.3 km²	637.8/km²	0.38%
56	Hürth	Rhein-Erft-Kreis	61,209	55,082	51.2 km²	1,195/km²	0.96%
57	Herten	Recklinghausen	61,062	61,505	37.3 km²	1,636/km²	-0.07%
58	Wesel	Wesel	59,988	60,335	123 km²	489.5/km²	-0.05%
59	Langenfeld, Rhineland	Mettmann	59,650	56,829	41.2 km²	1,450/km²	0.44%
60	Unna	Unna	59,515	59,149	88.6 km²	672.0/km²	0.06%
61	Euskirchen	Euskirchen	58,697	55,414	139 km²	420.8/km²	0.52%
62	Stolberg, Rhineland	Aachen	57,165	56,206	98.5 km²	580.5/km²	0.15%
63	Eschweiler	Aachen	57,093	54,671	75.8 km²	753.7/km²	0.39%
64	Meerbusch	Rhein-Kreis Neuss	56,999	54,313	64.4 km²	885.1/km²	0.44%
65	Sankt Augustin	Rhein-Sieg-Kreis	55,985	53,850	34.2 km²	1,636/km²	0.35%
66	Pulheim	Rhein-Erft-Kreis	55,199	52,929	72.2 km²	765.1/km²	0.38%
67	Hilden	Mettmann	55,085	54,390	26.0 km²	2,123/km²	0.12%
68	Bad Salzuflen	Lippe	53,889	52,285	100 km²	538.6/km²	0.27%
69	Hattingen	Ennepe-Ruhr-Kreis	52,758	54,253	71.7 km²	736.2/km²	-0.25%
70	Ahlen	Warendorf	52,669	52,280	123 km²	427.8/km²	0.07%
71	Menden, Sauerland	Märkischer Kreis	52,434	54,495	86.1 km²	609.0/km²	-0.35%
72	Kleve	Kleve	52,208	47,438	97.8 km²	534.0/km²	0.87%
73	Frechen	Rhein-Erft-Kreis	51,863	49,657	45.1 km²	1,151/km²	0.40%
74	Gummersbach	Oberbergischer Kreis	51,327	49,951	95.4 km²	538.0/km²	0.25%
75	Ibbenbüren	Steinfurt	50,618	50,569	109 km²	464.9/km²	0.01%
75	Bad Oeynhausen	Minden-Lübbecke	50,394	48,623	64.8 km²	777.3/km²	0.33%
