= List of things named after Anne, Queen of Great Britain =

This is a list of places and things named after Anne, Queen of Great Britain, who reigned from 1702 to 1714.

Not all things with "Queen Anne" in their name refer to Queen Anne (1665–1714). Anne's great-grandmother Anne of Denmark, the queen consort of King James I of England, lent her name to the theatrical company Queen Anne's Men, and Cape Ann, Massachusetts. Both queens are credited with lending their name to the plant Queen Anne's lace.

== Art, architecture, and design ==
- Queen Anne style architecture – A construction style in Great Britain during Anne's reign, and in the United States from the 1870s until the early 1900s (decade).
- Queen Anne style furniture – A furniture style popular at the beginning of the 18th century. Lighter and more graceful than its predecessors, its distinguishing characteristics included its curvilinear design, cabriole-style legs, and scallop-shell carvings.

== Law and government ==
- Queen Anne's Bounty, a tax used to augment the livings of poorer clergy
- Statute of Anne, the world's first substantial copyright law, which granted exclusive rights to authors rather than printers

== Militaria ==
- Queen Anne's Revenge, flagship of the notorious pirate Blackbeard
- Queen Anne's War, the North American theater of the War of the Spanish Succession
- Queen Anne pistol, a style of flintlock pistol with a 'turn-off' or screw-off barrel allowing it to be breach-loaded with a tight-fitting ball, popular in Britain during her reign.

== Places ==
- Annapolis, Maryland, United States was given its present name in 1694 by Sir Francis Nicholson in honour of then Princess Anne, the city's official flag (1965—) resembling Anne's personal royal badge.
- Annapolis Royal, Nova Scotia, Canada – originally Port-Royal, it became Annapolis Royal after its capture by the British from the French in 1710. Annapolis County, Nova Scotia, Annapolis River, and the Annapolis Valley take their names from the town of Annapolis Royal.
- Fort Ann, New York – Both the town and its accompanying village are indirectly named after Anne.
- Fort Anne, Nova Scotia – fortification in Annapolis Royal.
- Princess Anne County, Virginia (now defunct), named before her accession. The town of Princess Anne, Maryland, however, is named for Princess Anne of Great Britain, daughter of King George II.
- Queen Anne Terrace Car Park, Cambridge, UK.
- Queen Anne, Maryland, on the border of Talbot and Queen Anne's County, Maryland. There is a statue of Queen Anne in front of the Queen Anne's County courthouse in Centreville, Maryland, which was dedicated in 1977. The dedication ceremony was attended by Anne, Princess Royal, daughter of Elizabeth II.
- Queen Anne, Prince George's County, Maryland – Colonial port town established in 1706 near the tidal limit of the Patuxent River in Maryland, the town was later named Hardesty and never grew beyond the initial few houses and taverns. The county itself was named for her husband.
- Fluvanna County, Virginia, formed in 1777, was named after the Fluvanna River, which was so named by Captain John Smith during his explorations of the tributaries of the Chesapeake Bay 1607-1609. He renamed the Powhatan River after James I of England as far upstream as the Monacan village of Rassawek, where the river forks. He named the rivers converging there to form the James: the Rivanna River and the Fluvanna River, after King James's Queen Consort, Anne of Denmark. (This was long before the reign of Queen Anne of England, 1702 - 1714.) Today what was the Fluvanna River is considered an upper segment of the James River. The site of Rassawek, where the Rivanna River flows into the James, is called The Point of Fork, just as it was when the Virginia arsenal was there, during and after the American Revolution.

=== Buildings and streets ===
- Anne Street in Niagara on the Lake, Ontario
- Princess Anne Street in Fredericksburg, Virginia, named before her accession.
- Queen Anne Boulevard, Seattle
- Queen Anne's Gate, Westminster, London, UK – a short street created by merging a square with an inn-yard. A bust of the Queen stands halfway along.
- Queen Anne's Gate, an apartment complex in Weymouth, Massachusetts
- Queen Anne's School, Caversham, Berkshire
- Queen Anne Elementary School, Los Angeles, California
- Queen Anne Hotel, San Francisco, California
- Queen Anne Place, Los Angeles, California
- Queen Anne Road, Teaneck, New Jersey
- South Anne Street, Dublin, Ireland
- Queen Anne Square, a park in downtown Newport, Rhode Island
- Queen Square, Bloomsbury, London – There is a statue in the square of Queen Charlotte, wife of King George III, but the square itself was built in 1708 and named for Anne.
- Queen Square, Bristol, UK – This was the first residential square built outside London, in 1702. Anne paid a visit to the site during construction.
- St. Ann's Fort (St. Ann's Castle), The Garrison, Barbados – a large citadel built to protect the capital Bridgetown and the island of Barbados, constructed between 1703 and 1716. The Fort was part of the 19th century British Military Garrison and still stands today within the headquarters of the Barbados Defence Force. The Garrison is being considered by UNESCO for World Heritage Site status.
- Ann Street, Brisbane, Australia. (Streets of Brisbane's CBD are all named after British Kings and Queens)
- Queen Street, Portsmouth, UK. Bordering HM Dockyard. The dockyard wall, running along the north side of the western section of this road, is pierced by Victory gate at its western end. On the wall to the right of this gate (looking into the dockyard) is a plaque inscribed: "This wall was begun the 4th June and finished ye 13th December 1711".
- Queen Anne Road, Harwich, Massachusetts, A Residential Road in Running From East Dennis To Chatham, With the Majority in Harwich.
- Queen Anne Terrace, Plymouth, UK.
- Queen Anne Drive, Dorset, UK.

=== Geographical features ===
- Queen Anne neighborhood in Seattle, Washington, named for its Queen Anne style houses
- Queen Anne's Point, near Cape Coast, Ghana. There is an inaccurate local oral tradition that Queen Anne passed by in a ship.
- Fluvanna River, Fluvanna County, Virginia, from Latin meaning "Annie's River"

== Sports ==
- Queen Anne Stakes, horse racing event

== Other ==
- Fortnum & Mason Queen Anne Blend tea. "Created in 1907, our bicentennial year...commemorates the reigning sovereign in the year Fortnum & Mason first began."
- Hill, Thomson & Co Ltd. of Edinburgh released the "Queen Anne" Rare Scotch Whisky in 1884. Hill, Thomson – which was granted a Royal Warrant by Queen Victoria in 1838, and held under the reign of Queen Elizabeth II – merged with The Glenlivet distillery in 1970.
- Cunard Line's luxury ship Queen Anne entered the fleet in 2024 as the fourth ship, after Queen Elizabeth, Queen Victoria, and the flagship Queen Mary 2. Together, the fleet's names were chosen as a means of "honouring the names of each Queen Regnant over the last millennium."
