= List of cities in Lower Saxony by population =

The following list sorts all cities and communes in the German state of Lower Saxony with a population of more than 25,000. As of May 15, 2022, 63 cities fulfill this criterion and are listed here. This list refers only to the population of individual municipalities within their defined limits, which does not include other municipalities or suburban areas within urban agglomerations.

== List ==
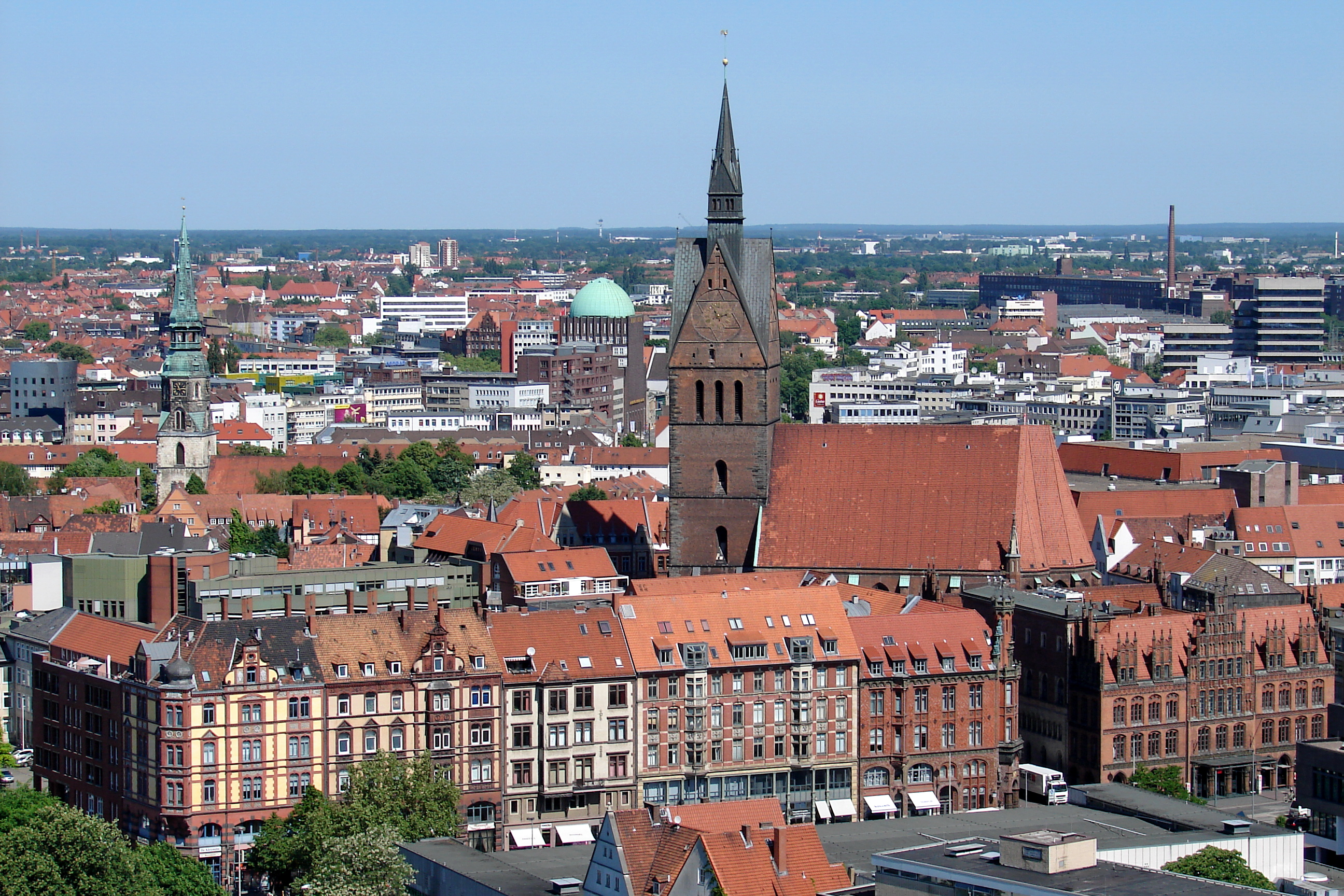
Hanover

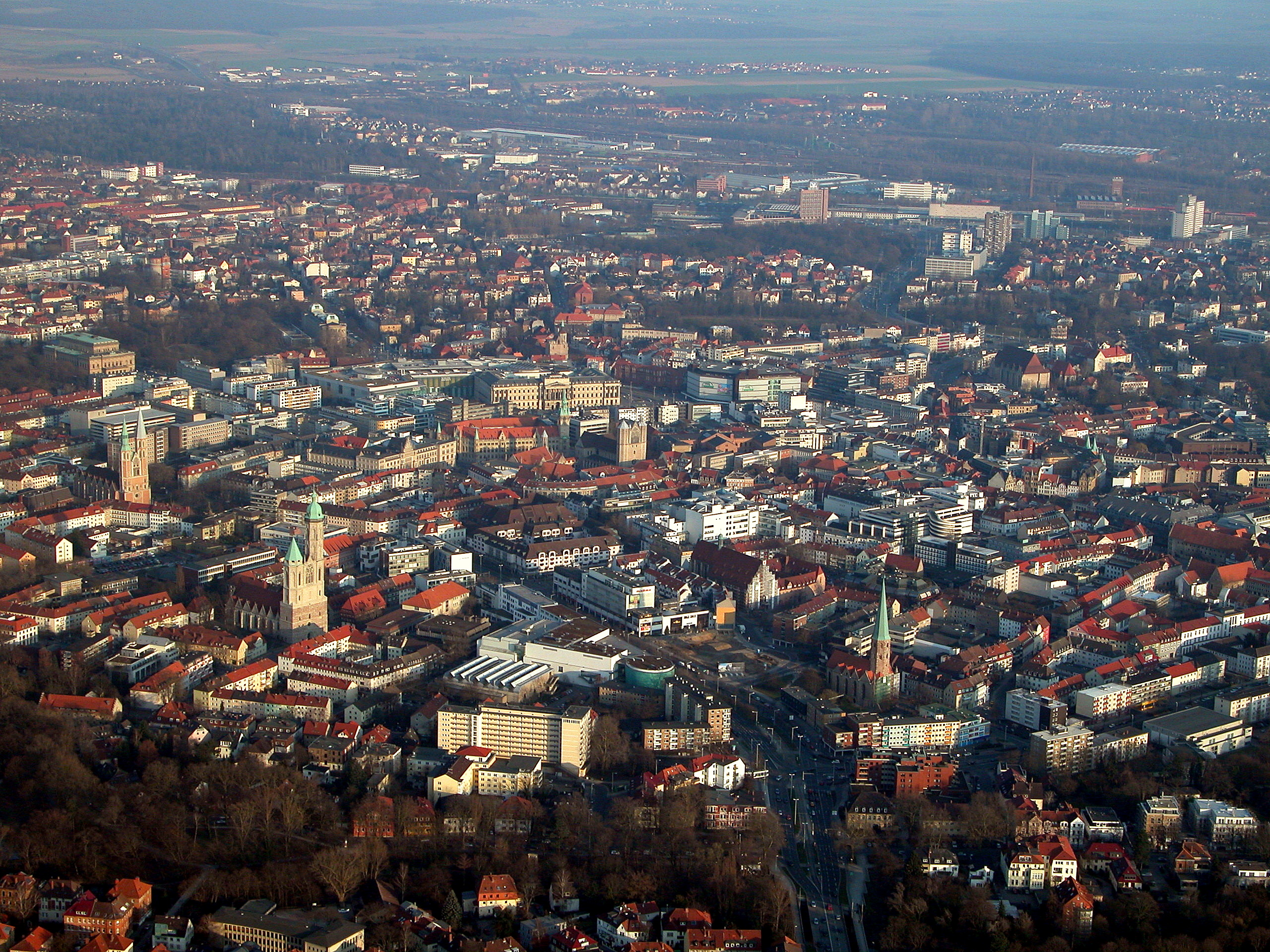
Braunschweig

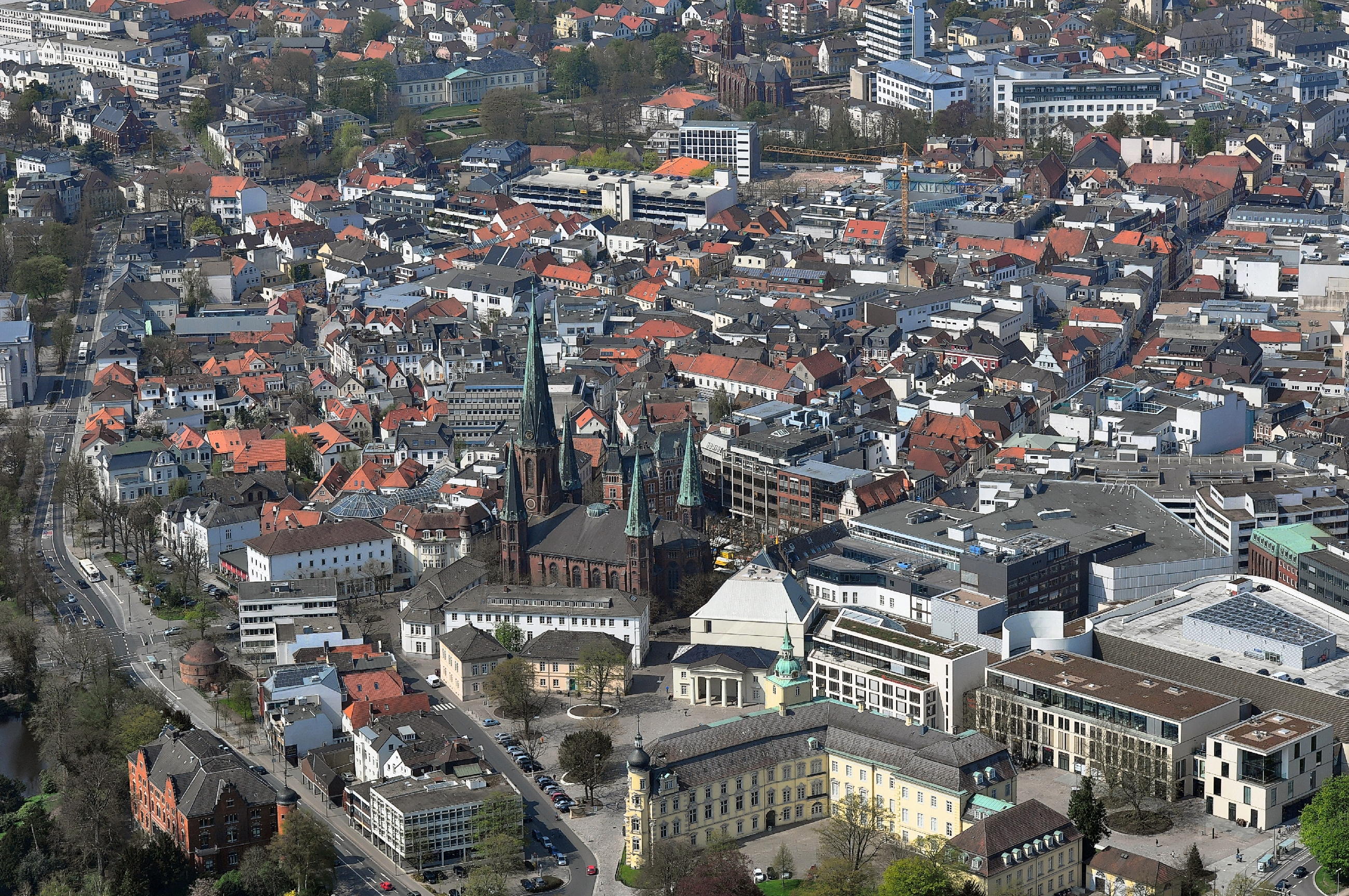
Oldenburg

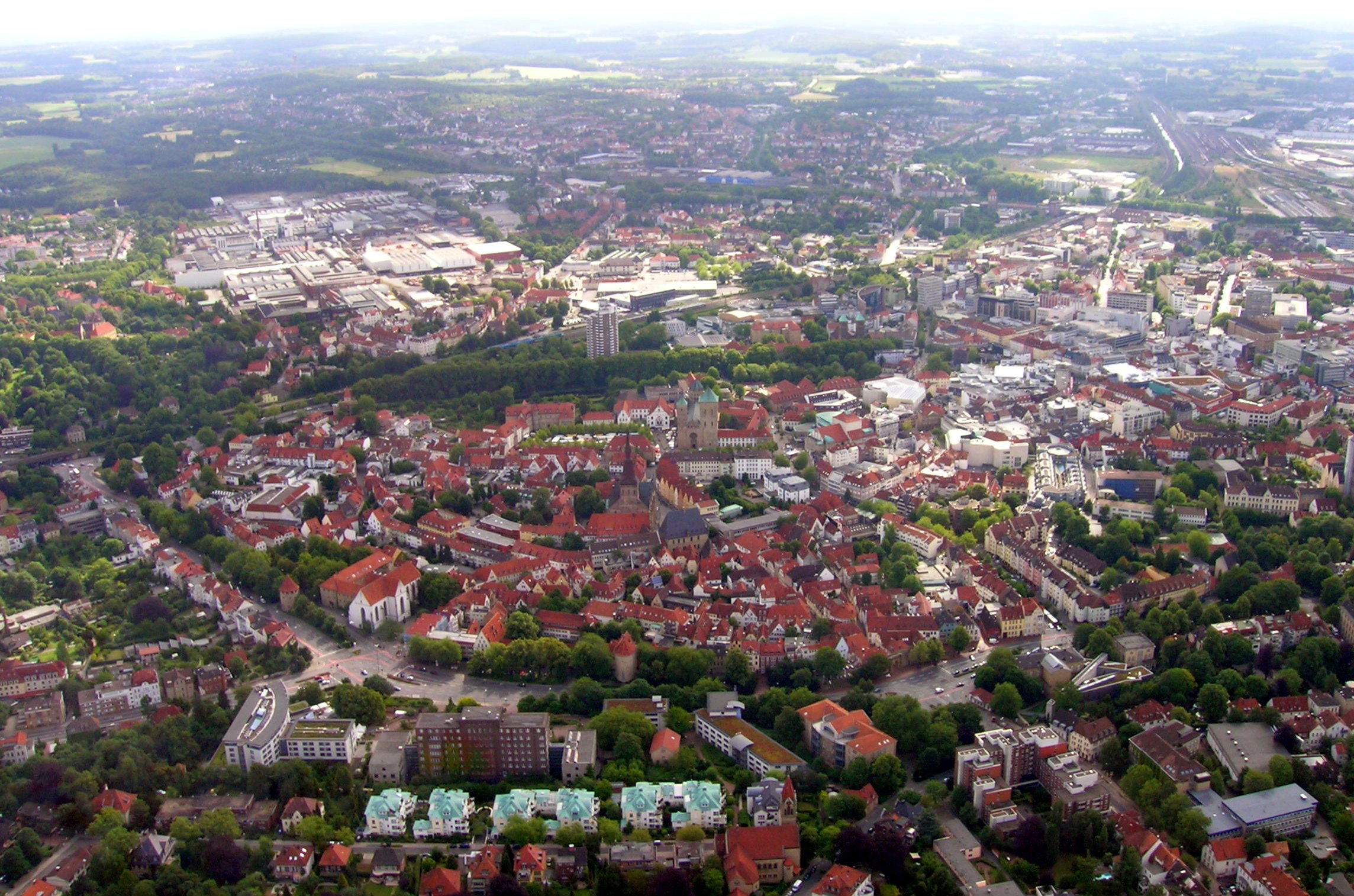
Osnabrück

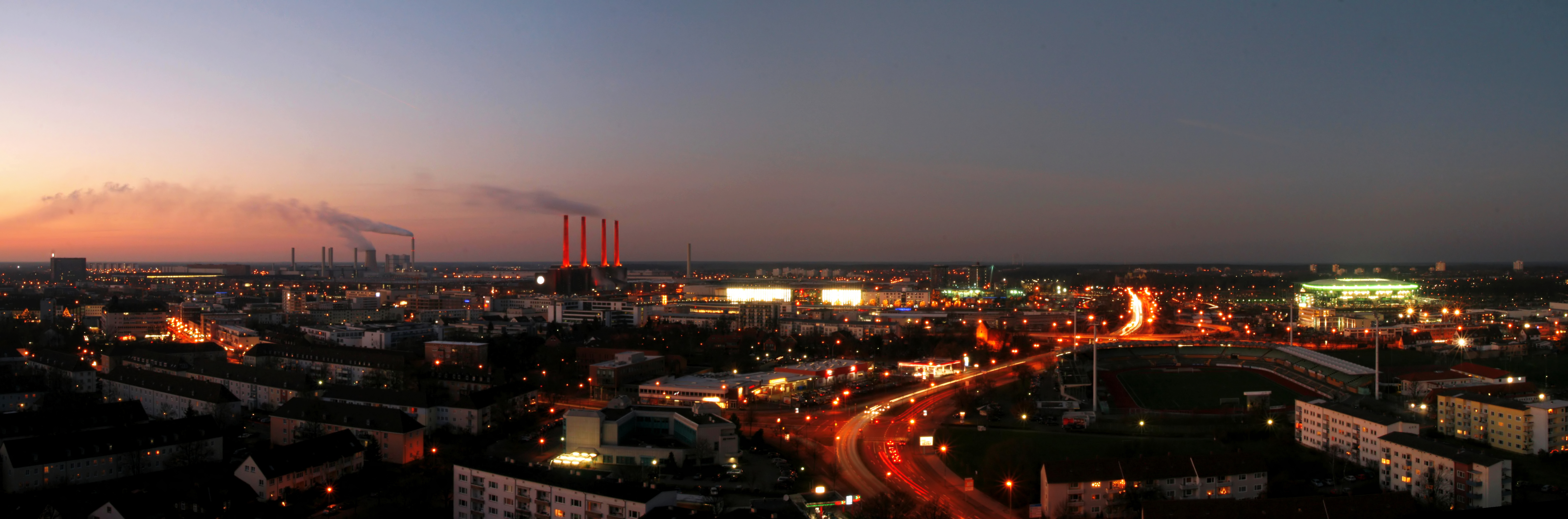
Wolfsburg

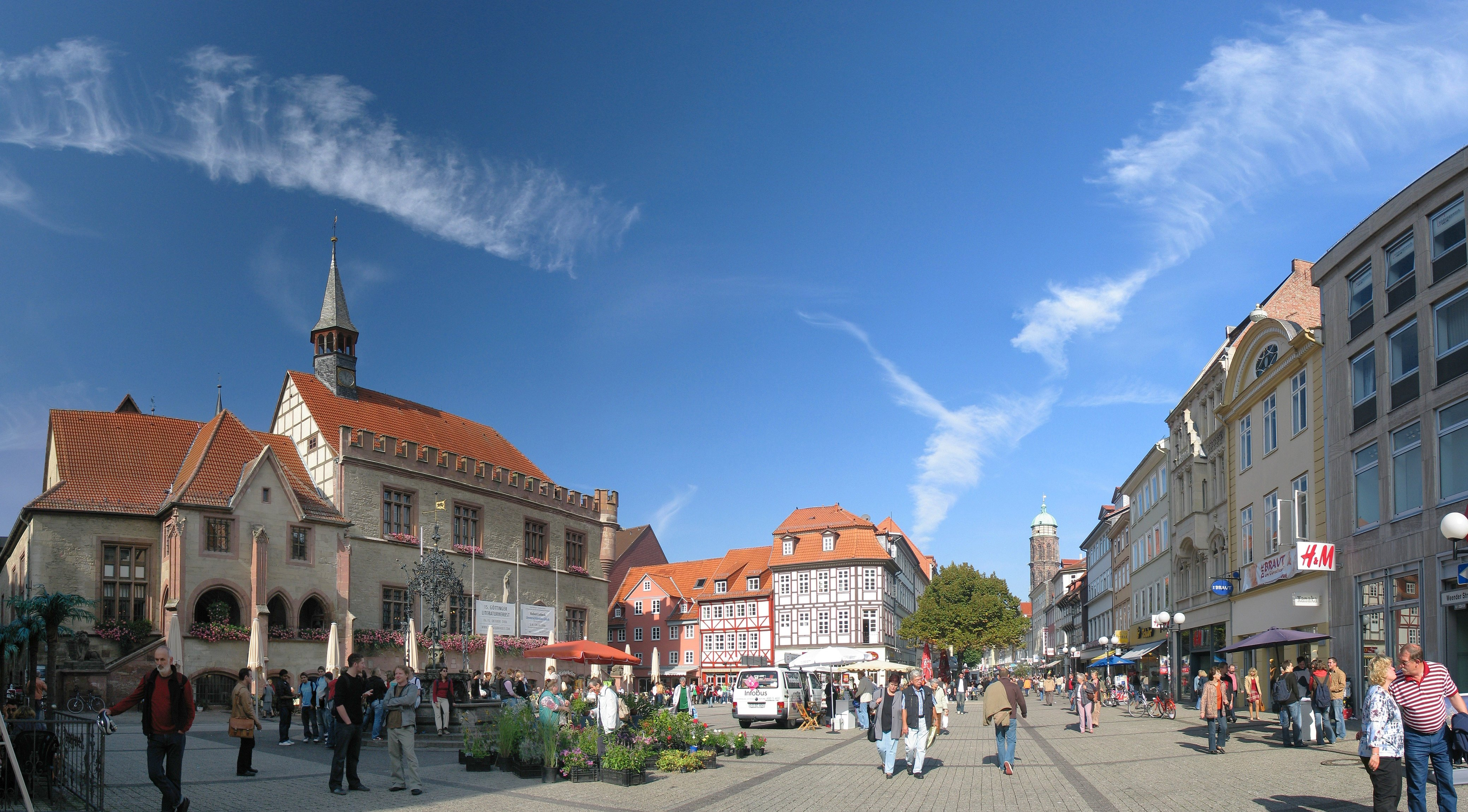
Göttingen

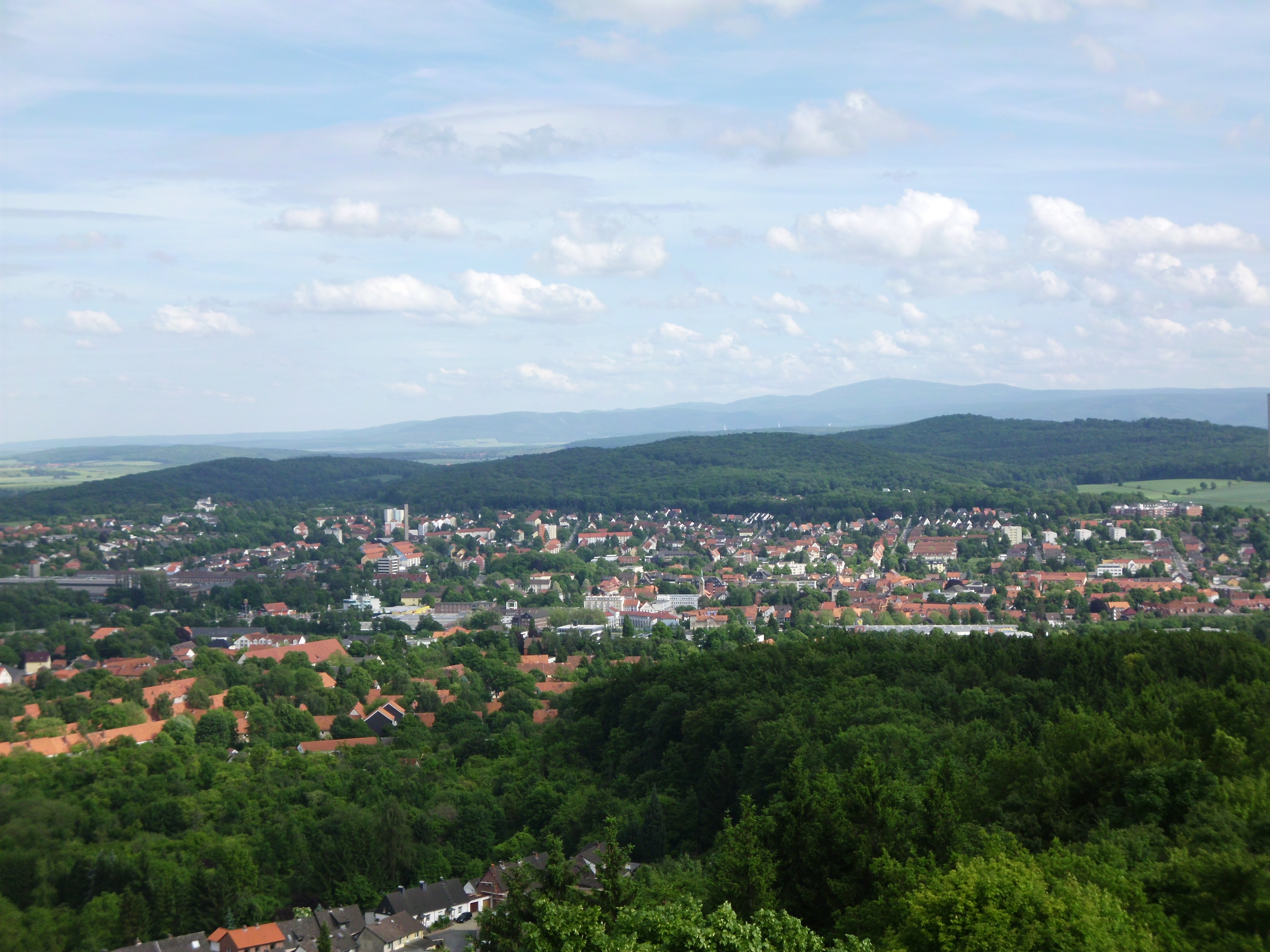
Salzgitter

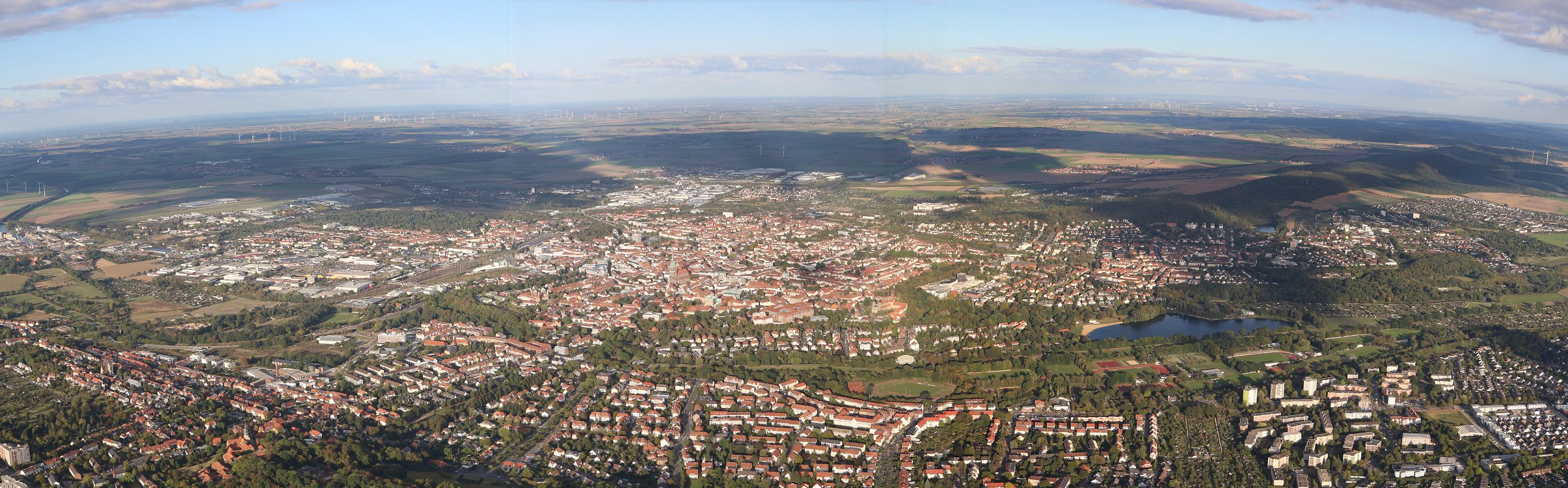
Hildesheim

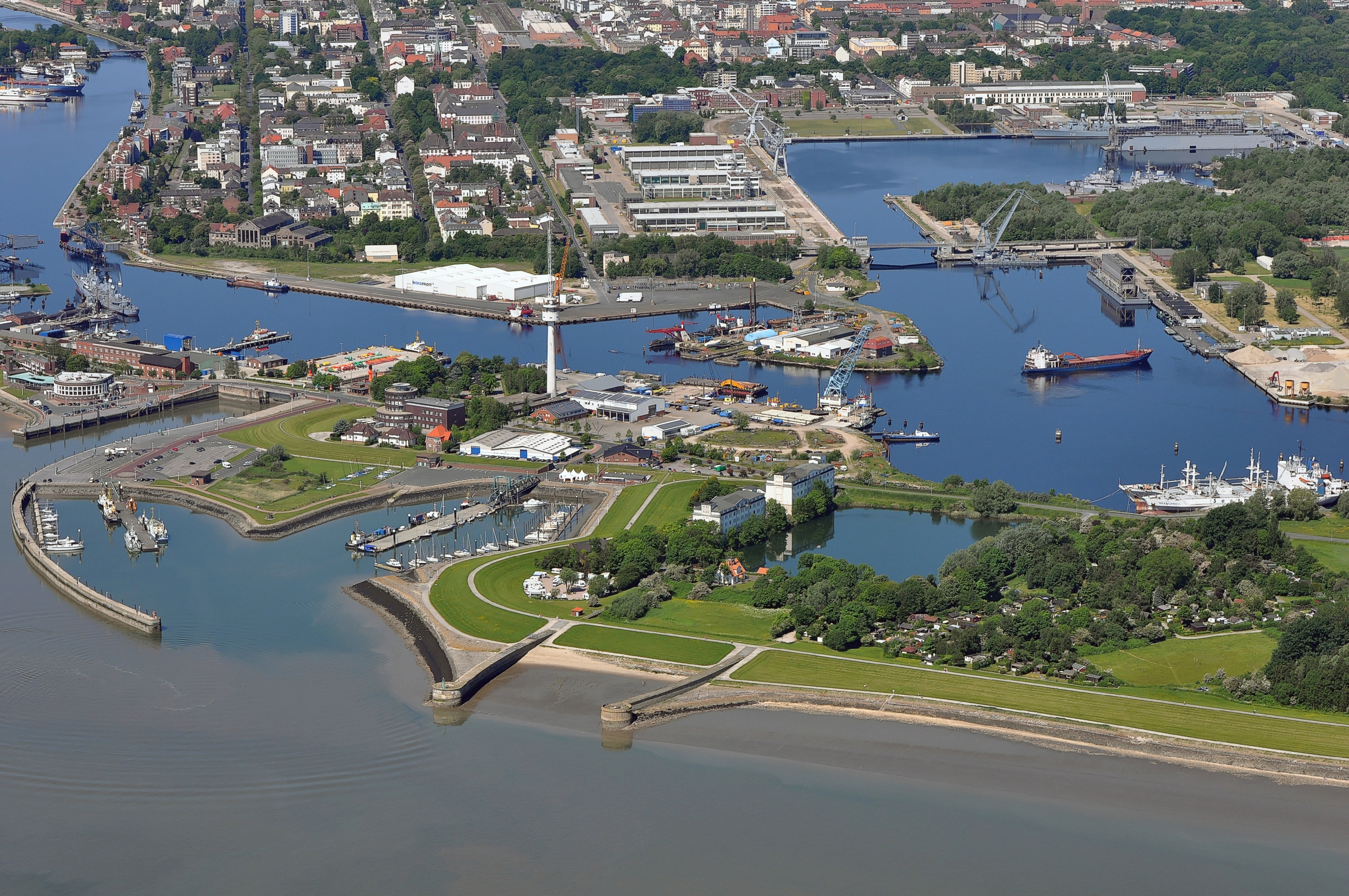
Wilhelmshaven

The following table lists the 63 cities and communes in Lower Saxony with a population of at least 25,000 on May 15, 2022, as estimated by the Federal Statistical Office of Germany. A city is displayed in bold if it is a state or federal capital.

1. The city rank by population as of May 15, 2022, as enumerate by the 2022 German Census
2. The city name
3. The name of the district (Landkreis) in which the city lies (some cities are districts on their own called urban districts)
4. The city population as of May 15, 2022, as enumerate by the 2022 German Census
5. The city population as of May 9, 2011, as enumerated by the 2011 European Union census
6. The city land area as of May 15, 2022
7. The city population density as of May 15, 2022 (residents per unit of land area)

2022 rank	City	District	2022 census	2011 census	2022 land area	2022 pop. density
1	**Hanover**	Hanover (region)	513,291	506,416	204 km^{2}	2,512/km^{2}
2	Braunschweig	urban district	252,816	242,537	193 km^{2}	1,312/km^{2}
3	Oldenburg	urban district	172,759	157,267	103 km^{2}	1,676/km^{2}
4	Osnabrück	urban district	164,898	153,699	120 km^{2}	1,376/km^{2}
5	Wolfsburg	urban district	127,145	119,984	205 km^{2}	621.4/km^{2}
6	Göttingen	Göttingen (district)	124,548	115,843	117 km^{2}	1,064/km^{2}
7	Salzgitter	urban district	104,215	98,895	224 km^{2}	464.2/km^{2}
8	Hildesheim	Hildesheim (district)	97,716	99,554	92.3 km^{2}	1,059/km^{2}
9	Delmenhorst	urban district	80,845	73,322	62.5 km^{2}	1,295/km^{2}
10	Wilhelmshaven	urban district	75,366	77,451	107 km^{2}	703.6/km^{2}
11	Lüneburg	Lüneburg (district)	72,870	69,905	70.5 km^{2}	1,034/km^{2}
12	Celle	Celle (district)	66,610	69,001	176 km^{2}	378.4/km^{2}
13	Garbsen	Hanover (region)	59,534	59,499	79.5 km^{2}	748.9/km^{2}
14	Hamelin	Hameln-Pyrmont	58,123	56,756	103 km^{2}	566.9/km^{2}
15	Nordhorn	County of Bentheim (district)	55,724	52,029	150 km^{2}	371.8/km^{2}
16	Lingen (Ems)	Emsland	55,092	51,821	176 km^{2}	312.7/km^{2}
17	Langenhagen	Hanover (region)	53,711	50,821	72.0 km^{2}	746.3/km^{2}
18	Wolfenbüttel	Wolfenbüttel (district)	51,750	51,756	78.7 km^{2}	657.3/km^{2}
19	Peine	Peine (district)	50,276	48,582	120 km^{2}	419.5/km^{2}
20	Cuxhaven	Cuxhaven (district)	49,740	49,093	162 km^{2}	307.2/km^{2}
21	Emden	urban district	48,920	49,787	112 km^{2}	435.5/km^{2}
22	Stade	Stade (district)	47,852	45,141	110 km^{2}	434.7/km^{2}
23	Goslar	Goslar (district)	47,433	51,261	164 km^{2}	289.4/km^{2}
24	Melle	Osnabrück (district)	46,187	45,855	254 km^{2}	181.9/km^{2}
25	Neustadt am Rübenberge	Hanover (region)	44,274	43,542	359 km^{2}	123.3/km^{2}
26	Lehrte	Hanover (region)	43,501	42,655	128 km^{2}	340.7/km^{2}
27	Seevetal	Harburg (district)	43,261	39,838	105 km^{2}	410.7/km^{2}
28	Gifhorn	Gifhorn (district)	42,006	41,152	105 km^{2}	398.5/km^{2}
29	Laatzen	Hanover (region)	41,966	38,877	34.2 km^{2}	1,229/km^{2}
30	Aurich	Aurich (district)	41,631	40,699	197 km^{2}	211.0/km^{2}
31	Wunstorf	Hanover (region)	40,984	40,633	126 km^{2}	325.9/km^{2}
32	Buchholz in der Nordheide	Harburg (district)	40,849	36,656	74.8 km^{2}	546.4/km^{2}
33	Buxtehude	Stade (district)	39,950	39,552	76.7 km^{2}	520.9/km^{2}
34	Papenburg	Emsland	36,770	35,060	118 km^{2}	310.5/km^{2}
35	Meppen	Emsland	36,429	33,997	188 km^{2}	193.4/km^{2}
36	Winsen (Luhe)	Harburg (district)	36,173	32,494	110 km^{2}	329.5/km^{2}
37	Cloppenburg	Cloppenburg (district)	35,988	32,932	70.9 km^{2}	507.9/km^{2}
38	Seelze	Hanover (region)	34,324	31,827	54.1 km^{2}	634.7/km^{2}
39	Leer (Ostfriesland)	Leer (district)	34,181	34,017	70.1 km^{2}	487.5/km^{2}
40	Barsinghausen	Hanover (region)	33,727	33,053	103 km^{2}	328.1/km^{2}
41	Stuhr	Diepholz (district)	33,324	32,382	81.8 km^{2}	407.2/km^{2}
42	Vechta	Vechta (district)	33,126	30,319	87.9 km^{2}	376.9/km^{2}
43	Uelzen	Uelzen (district)	32,680	33,606	137 km^{2}	238.8/km^{2}
44	Achim	Verden (district)	32,176	29,531	68.1 km^{2}	472.8/km^{2}
45	Nienburg (Weser)	Nienburg (district)	32,021	30,875	64.5 km^{2}	496.2/km^{2}
46	Georgsmarienhütte	Osnabrück (district)	31,548	31,959	55.5 km^{2}	568.5/km^{2}
47	Burgdorf	Hanover (region)	31,045	28,845	113 km^{2}	275.8/km^{2}
48	Walsrode	Heidekreis	31,007	30,466	336.5 km^{2}	92.2/km^{2}
49	Geestland	Cuxhaven (district)	30,932	30,683	357 km^{2}	86.8/km^{2}
50	Ganderkesee	Oldenburg (district)	30,897	30,373	138 km^{2}	223.2/km^{2}
51	Bramsche	Osnabrück (district)	30,625	30,158	183 km^{2}	167.0/km^{2}
52	Weyhe	Diepholz (district)	30,500	29,918	60.4 km^{2}	505.3/km^{2}
53	Osterholz-Scharmbeck	Osterholz	29,762	30,298	147 km^{2}	202.2/km^{2}
54	Einbeck	Northeim (district)	29,713	32,226	232 km^{2}	128.1/km^{2}
55	Bad Zwischenahn	Ammerland	29,440	27,437	130 km^{2}	226.3/km^{2}
56	Wedemark	Hanover (region)	29,409	28,223	174 km^{2}	168.8/km^{2}
57	Springe	Hanover (region)	28,513	28,575	160 km^{2}	178.1/km^{2}
58	Lohne	Vechta (district)	27,985	24,819	91.1 km^{2}	307.2/km^{2}
59	Northeim	Northeim (district)	27,369	29,327	146 km^{2}	187.7/km^{2}
60	Verden an der Aller	Verden (district)	26,950	26,664	71.7 km^{2}	375.9/km^{2}
61	Nordenham	Wesermarsch	25,862	26,491	87.8 km^{2}	294.6/km^{2}
62	Rinteln	Schaumburg	25,626	25,791	109 km^{2}	235.1/km^{2}
63	Helmstedt	Helmstedt (district)	25,040	25,941	66.7 km^{2}	375.2/km^{2}
