= List of places in Schleswig-Holstein =

This is a list of geographical features in the state of Schleswig-Holstein, Germany.

== Rivers ==
- Eider
- Elbe
- Trave
- Holstenau

== Islands ==
- Amrum
- Fehmarn
- Föhr
- Heligoland
- North Frisian Islands
- Pellworm
- Sylt

== Miscellaneous ==
- Angeln
- Dithmarschen
- Elbe-Lübeck Canal
- Frisia
- Holstein
- Kiel Canal
- Nordfriesland
- Nordstrand
- Plön
- Great Plön Lake
- Lesser Plön Lake
- Schleswig
  - Southern Schleswig
- Wadden Sea National Parks
- Wadden Sea

== Cities ==
- Eckernförde
- Flensburg
- Heide
- Husum
- Kiel
- Lübeck
- Neumünster
- Norderstedt
- Rendsburg
- Schleswig (city)
