= Lists of places by eponym =

These are lists of places by eponym, i.e. lists grouping places named after the same person.

- Abu Bakar of Johor
- Benjamin Franklin
- C. N. Annadurai
- Charles de Gaulle
- Christopher Columbus
- DeWitt Clinton
- Douglas MacArthur
- Francis of Assisi
- Francis Marion
- Franjo Tuđman
- George S. Patton
- Heracles
- Israel Putnam
- John C. Calhoun
- John Marshall
- Joseph Stalin
- Josip Broz Tito
- José Rizal
- Joyce Kilmer
- Lewis Cass
- Mallory
- Marquis de Lafayette
- Nathanael Greene
- Pierre Brossolette
- Prince Marko
- Queen Victoria
- Richard Montgomery
- Robert Byrd
- Sam Houston
- Simón Bolívar
- Tadeusz Kościuszko
- Vladimir Lenin
- Popes
  - Pope Francis
  - Pope John Paul II
- Presidents of the United States
  - Dwight D. Eisenhower
  - Andrew Jackson
  - Thomas Jefferson
  - James Madison
  - James Monroe
  - James K. Polk
  - George Washington
