= Helen Reed de Laporte =

American politician and civic leader

Member of the Rhinebeck School Board

Regent of the Chancellor Livingston Chapter, Daughters of the American Revolution

Personal details
- Born: Helen Reed; 1864
- Died: August 30, 1936 (aged 71–72) Rhinebeck, New York, U.S.
- Resting place: Rhinebeck Cemetery
- Spouse: Theodore de Laporte
- Education: Vassar College
- Occupation: teacher, politician, civic leader

Helen Reed de Laporte (1864–1936) was an American teacher, civic leader, and politician. She taught at the DeGarmo Institute in Rhinebeck, New York and was elected to serve on the village's school board, becoming the first woman in Dutchess County, New York to be elected to a board of education. De Laporte was the charter regent of the Chancellor Livingston Chapter of the Daughters of the American Revolution and donated the General Richard and Janet Livingston Montgomery House to the chapter.

== Biography ==
De Laporte was born Helen Reed in 1864 to Thomas Reed and Julia A. Van Keuren Reed. She was the great-granddaughter of Abram VanKeuren Jr., who owned Springbrook Farm. De Laporte grew up on the Springbrook estate, and her parents enlarged the main house several times. De Laporte later inherited the property and sold it to the Rhinebeck Realty & Development Company, who in turn sold it to the Dutchess County Agricultural Society.

She was educated at the DeGarmo Institute in Rhinebeck. She graduated from Vassar College in 1886.

De Laporte was an educator, employed as a teacher at the DeGarmo Institute. She was elected to serve on the Rhinebeck School Board, becoming the first woman to be elected to a board of education in Dutchess County.

She founded the Chancellor Livingston Chapter of the Daughters of the American Revolution. In 1930, de Laporte deeded the General Richard and Janet Livingston Montgomery House to her chapter to be used as a meeting house and a museum. She served as a delegate to the National Society Daughters of the American Revolution's Continental Congress at Memorial Continental Hall in Washington, D.C. in April 1933.

De Laporte helped organize local Memorial Day observances in her town. She gave various addresses about preserving historical properties in the area and worked to establish family lines tracing back to patriots of the American Revolution.
