= Montgomery County =

Montgomery County may refer to:

== Australia ==
- The former name of Montgomery Land District, Tasmania

== United Kingdom ==
- The historic county of Montgomeryshire, Wales, also called County of Montgomery

== United States ==
- Montgomery County, Alabama
- Montgomery County, Arkansas
- Montgomery County, Georgia
- Montgomery County, Illinois
- Montgomery County, Indiana
- Montgomery County, Iowa
- Montgomery County, Kansas
- Montgomery County, Kentucky
- Montgomery County, Maryland
- Montgomery County, Mississippi
- Montgomery County, Missouri
- Montgomery County, New York
- Montgomery County, North Carolina
- Montgomery County, Ohio
- Montgomery County, Pennsylvania
- Montgomery County, Tennessee
- Montgomery County, Texas
- Montgomery County, Virginia

== See also ==
- List of places named for Richard Montgomery
- Lemuel P. Montgomery
