= General Richard and Janet Livingston Montgomery House =

Historic house in Rhinebeck, New York

- Interactive map of the General Richard and Janet Livingston Montgomery House area

General information
- Status: Active
- Type: residence
- Location: 77 Livingston Street; Rhinebeck, New York, U.S.
- Coordinates: 41°55′44″N 73°54′16″W
- Completed: c. 1750
- Owner: Richard Montgomery and Janet Livingston (former); Rhinebeck Reformed Church (former); Helen Reed de Laporte (former); Daughters of the American Revolution (current)

The General Richard and Janet Montgomery House is a historic house in Rhinebeck, New York. The American Revolutionary War General Richard Montgomery and his wife, Janet Livingston, lived in the house when Montgomery took command of the northern forces of the Continental Army.

== History ==
The 1.5-story post and beam tenant farmhouse was built around 1750. The house was the residence of Richard Montgomery, an American Revolutionary general, and Janet Livingston Montgomery, a member of the prominent Livingston family, while General Montgomery served as commander of the Continental Army's northern forces, fighting the British troops from Canada. The house was a wedding gift for the couple, given by Livingston's grandfather, Henry Beekman, in 1773. It was their temporary residence while they awaited the construction of their estate, Grasmere.

The house was purchased and sold several times throughout the nineteenth century, and was eventually moved by the leaders of the Rhinebeck Reformed Church from its original location to its current location on Livingston Street.

In 1930, Helen Reed de Laporte, the founder of the Chancellor Livingston Chapter of the Daughters of the American Revolution, deeded the house to her chapter. The chapter operates it as a chapter house and as a museum.
