= Richard Montgomery =

Irish-born American army officer (1738–1775)

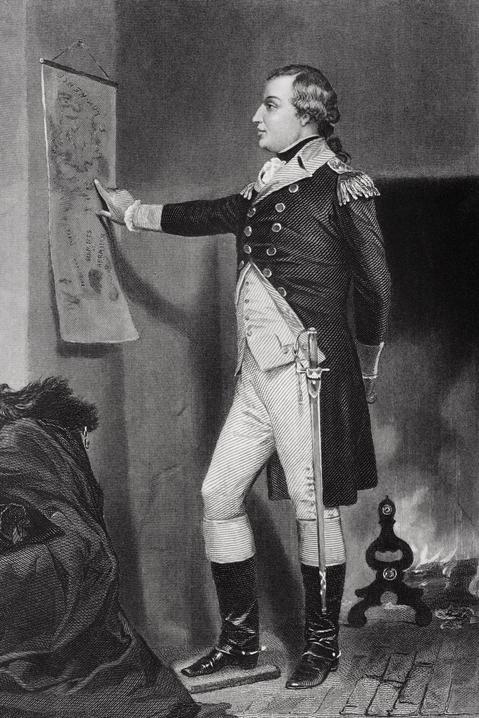
- Engraving of Montgomery by Alonzo Chappel
- Born: 2 December 1738; Feltrim, County Dublin, Kingdom of Ireland
- Died: 31 December 1775 (aged 37) Quebec City, Province of Quebec, British America
- Buried: Quebec City, Province of Quebec, British America (reinterred in 1818 to St. Paul's Churchyard, Manhattan, New York City)
- Allegiance: Great Britain; United Colonies
- Branch: British Army (1756–1772); Continental Army (1775)
- Rank: Major general
- Conflicts: Seven Years' War; Siege of Louisbourg; Battle of Ticonderoga; Expedition against Martinique; Expedition against Cuba; Pontiac's War; American Revolutionary War; Invasion of Quebec; Battle of Fort St. Jean; Battle of Quebec †
- Spouse: Janet Livingston (m. 1773)

Richard Montgomery (2 December 1738 – 31 December 1775) was an Irish-born American army officer. First serving in the British Army, he later became a major general in the Continental Army during the American Revolutionary War. On 31 December 1775, Montgomery was killed while leading an unsuccessful invasion of Quebec.

Montgomery was born and raised in Ireland to an Ulster-Scots family. In 1754, he enrolled at Trinity College Dublin, and two years later joined the British army and served in the French and Indian War. He steadily rose through the ranks, serving in North America and the West Indies. After the war he was stationed at Fort Detroit during Pontiac's War, following which he returned to Britain for health reasons. In 1773, Montgomery returned to the Thirteen Colonies, married Janet Livingston, and began farming.

When the Revolutionary War broke out, Montgomery joined the Patriot cause, and was elected to the New York Provincial Congress in May 1775. In June 1775, he was commissioned as a Brigadier general in the Continental Army. After Philip Schuyler became too ill to lead the invasion of Quebec, Montgomery took over. He captured Fort St. Jean and Montreal in November 1775, and then advanced to Quebec City, where he joined another force under the command of Benedict Arnold. On 31 December, he led an attack on the city, but was killed during the battle. The British found his body and gave him an honorable burial. His remains were moved to New York City in 1818.

== Early life ==
Montgomery was born at Feltrim, near the County Dublin town of Swords, on 2 December 1738. He was born into an Ulster Scots gentry family, the County Donegal branch of the Clan Montgomery. His father, Thomas Montgomery, was a British Army officer and a Member of Parliament (MP) for the pocket borough of Lifford in east Donegal, which returned two MPs to the Irish Parliament. Thomas' brother Alexander Montgomery (1720–1800) and cousin, another Alexander Montgomery (1686–1729), were both colonels and MPs for County Donegal.

Richard Montgomery spent most of his childhood at Abbeville House in Kinsealy, near Swords, in County Dublin, where he learned to hunt, ride, shoot, and fence. Thomas Montgomery made sure that his sons received a good education; Richard attended the school of the Rev. Saumarez Dubourdieu in Leixlip, and learned French, Latin, and rhetoric. Richard Montgomery entered Trinity College Dublin in 1754.

Despite his great love of knowledge, Montgomery did not receive a degree. He was urged by his father and his oldest brother Alexander to join the military, which he did on 21 September 1756. His father purchased an ensign's commission for Montgomery, who joined the 17th Regiment of Foot.

== Seven Years War ==
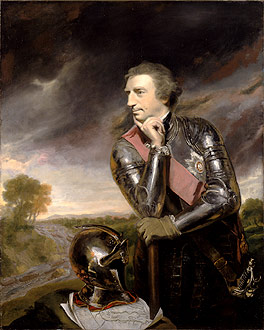
General Jeffery Amherst promoted Montgomery to lieutenant after the Siege of Louisbourg in 1758.

=== North America ===
On 3 February 1757, the 17th Foot was ordered to march from its garrison at Galway and prepare to be deployed overseas. On 5 May, Montgomery and the 17th Foot sailed from Cork for Halifax, Nova Scotia, arriving in July. The British had planned an attempt on Louisbourg but the operation was called off, and they sailed instead for winter quarters in New York. In 1758, the 17th Foot was sent back to Halifax, once again with the goal of taking Louisbourg.

The British commanders, Jeffery Amherst and James Abercromby drew up a plan to assault the French at Louisbourg, which is located on the Atlantic coast of Cape Breton Island, north of Halifax. The French garrison consisted of only 800 men, while the British force had 13,142 troops supported by 23 ships of the line and 13 frigates. On 8 June 1758, the attack on the fort began. Montgomery landed on the beach under heavy fire and ordered his troops to advance with fixed bayonets. The outer French defenses withdrew back toward the city. Montgomery's unit and the rest of the British force chased the French back to a point just outside the Fort's guns. At this point, the British prepared to besiege the city. Due to bad weather, artillery and other materials needed for the siege took several weeks to arrive onshore. Montgomery had his men dig entrenchments and build breastworks, also ordering his men stay alert to the possibility of a French attack. On 9 July, the French attempted a breakout, but it failed. On 26 July, following a series of actions resulting in the destruction of most their fleet, the French surrendered. General Amherst was impressed by Montgomery's action during the siege, and promoted him to lieutenant.

On 8 July 1758, James Abercromby attacked Fort Carillon on Lake Champlain, but was repelled with heavy losses. In August, Montgomery and the 17th foot sailed to Boston, marched to join with Abercromby's forces in Albany and then moved to Lake George. On 9 November, Abercromby was recalled; Amherst replaced him as commander-in-chief. The British high command, for the 1759 campaign, developed a plan for a three-pronged attack into Canada, in which forces including the 17th foot would assault Fort Carillon and also capture Fort St. Frédéric, near Crown Point, New York. Under Amherst's command, Montgomery and the 17th Foot participated in the capture of Fort Carillon. While the army was gathering prior to the battle, Montgomery's company was on guard duty; he ordered his men to remain vigilant for French and Indian ambush parties. On 9 May his suspicions proved correct when 12 men from the 17th were attacked. Montgomery and the 17th met stiff resistance at first. Montgomery ordered that his men were not to fire at night, fearing they would shoot their comrades. On 21 July, the army began its movement toward Fort Carillon; by the 26th they were in position outside the fort's walls, from which the French had already withdrawn most of their forces to Fort St. Frédéric. That night, after some exchange of cannon fire during the day, the French blew up Carillon's powder magazine, and Fort St. Frédéric the next day, and withdrew to the far end of Lake Champlain.

The 17th, which was placed under the command of Major General Robert Monckton late in 1759, spent the winter on garrison duty in the Mohawk River valley. On 15 May 1760, Monckton named Montgomery as regimental adjutant, a position awarded by the commanding officer to the most promising lieutenant in the regiment. In August, the 17th Foot joined with the Lake Champlain Division, and set out from Crown Point to participate in a three-pronged attack on Montreal. The 17th Foot captured the Île aux Noix and Fort Chambly before meeting with the two other divisions outside Montreal. The marquis de Vaudreuil-Cavagnial, the governor of Canada, seeing that the city could not be defended, surrendered the city without a fight. With the fall of Montreal, all of Canada fell into British hands. In the summer of 1761, Montgomery and the 17th Foot marched from Montreal to Staten Island.

=== Caribbean ===
After conquering Canada, the British government put together a plan to defeat the French in the West Indies. In November 1761, Montgomery and the 17th set sail for Barbados, where they joined other units from North America. On 5 January 1762, the force left Barbados and headed towards the French island of Martinique, arriving there in mid-January. The French, having received word of an impending attack, had built up their defenses. A beachhead was quickly established, and the main offensive began on 24 January. The French outer defenses were overrun and the survivors fled to the capital, Fort Royal. The British prepared to launch an assault on the fort, but the French, seeing the situation was hopeless, surrendered. On 12 February, the entire island surrendered. After the fall of Martinique, the rest of the French West Indies, Grenada, Saint Lucia, and Saint Vincent, fell to the British without a fight. On 6 May 1762, in reward for his actions in Martinique, Lieutenant Colonel John Campbell promoted Montgomery to captain and gave him command of one of the ten companies of the 17th Foot.

Spain entered the war in 1761 as an ally of France. The British high command believed that capturing Havana would destroy the lines of communication from Spain to its colonial empire. On 6 June, the assaulting British forces arrived seven miles off the shore of Havana. The 17th Foot, including Montgomery's company, was to capture Moro Fort, the key to the Spanish defense of the city. British battleships bombarded the fort, silencing all but two Spanish guns. On 30 July, Montgomery and the 17th Foot stormed and captured the fort. In late August 1762, Montgomery and the 17th Foot were sent to New York, where they remained for the rest of the war. The conflict was ended by the signing of the Treaty of Paris on 10 February 1763.

== Pontiac's War ==
Angered by the French surrender and unhappy with British policies that affected them, an Ottawa chief, Pontiac, organized 18 Native American tribes that attacked British military and civilian settlements beginning in April 1763. The tribes captured eight British forts and forced the evacuation of two more. General Amherst ordered the 17th to Albany in June 1763 to assist in combating the outbreak of hostilities.

En route to Albany, the ship carrying Montgomery up the Hudson River ran aground near Clermont Manor, seat of the politically powerful Livingston family. While the ship was refloated, the Livingstons played host to the ship's officers. Montgomery met Robert Livingston's 20-year-old daughter Janet. We do not know what happened between them at this time, but Janet noticed that Montgomery was not with the regiment (having been given leave to return to England early) when it returned to New York.

The 17th was first assigned to garrison duty at Fort Stanwix, where Montgomery remained until 1764. In 1764, Montgomery applied to Colonel Campbell and General Thomas Gage for leave to return to England; his service in the Caribbean had taken a toll on his health. Gage granted the leave, directing Colonel Campbell to approve the leave as soon as possible. Campbell, whose subordinate officers had been depleted in the Caribbean campaign, would grant the leave only after the upcoming expedition.

The British in 1764 organized two expeditions to combat the uprising. Montgomery and the 17th were on one of these expeditions, commanded by John Bradstreet, that went to Fort Niagara in July, where they were stationed for one month, while Sir William Johnson organized and held a major conference with Natives from around the Great Lakes. The conference drew more than 2,000 natives; Bradstreet's forces stayed there as a deterrent to rumored Native attacks. They then marched to Fort Detroit, which had been subject to a surprise attack earlier, arriving in August. For several weeks, Montgomery stayed at the fort, helping to improve its defenses, and also gaining an understanding of how to interact with the Natives. In September, Bradstreet left Fort Detroit for Sandusky, to meet with the Shawnee and the Delaware; while the 17th remained on garrison duty at Fort Detroit and Fort Michilimackinac, Montgomery, whose leave had been granted, accompanied him. On 3 October, Montgomery and several other officers met with Thomas King, an Oneida chief. King had accompanied a detachment of Bradstreet's men on operations in Illinois; he reported that the Natives were quite hostile there, and had recommended against military action against them. Two days later, at a larger conference with Bradstreet and Iroquois leaders, Bradstreet explained to them that the British would not be attacking the Shawnee and Delaware. Bradstreet then released Montgomery, who traveled first to Johnson Hall and then New York, where he delivered dispatches from Bradstreet to Gage before departing for England.

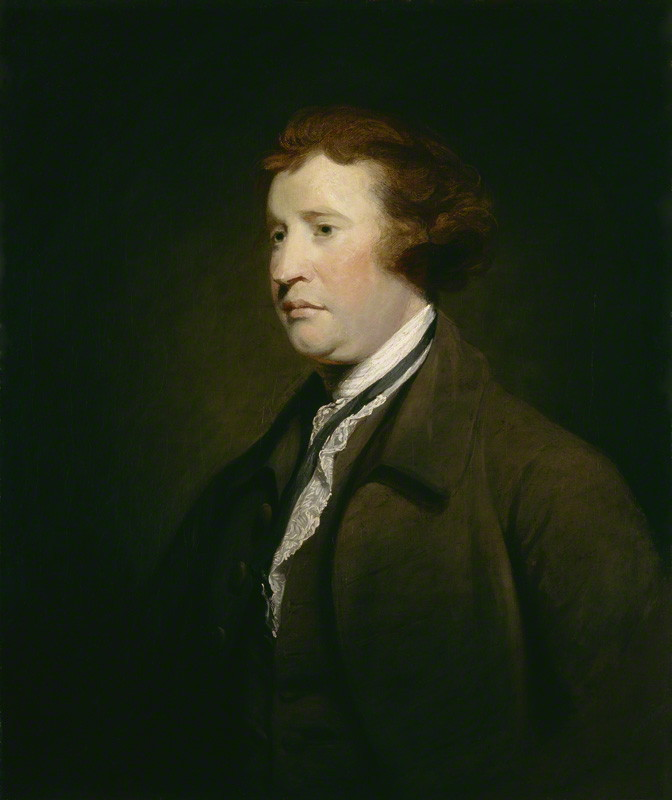
Edmund Burke was one of Montgomery's associates in Britain.

== Recovery ==
In Britain, Montgomery recovered his health. He associated with Whig Members of Parliament, who generally supported the colonists in their demands for more political freedom. Montgomery became friends with several prominent Whigs such as Isaac Barré, Edmund Burke, and Charles James Fox. While stationed in Britain, Montgomery spent much of his time discussing politics with these three men. He began to question the British Government's policies. In 1768, with the 17th Foot back in England, he began a recruitment drive; before it began, his company was only 17 men. He also became engaged; however, his fiancée proved to be untrue, and the engagement was broken.

After being passed over for promotion in 1771, likely because of his political affiliations, he sold his commission for about £1,500 and left the military in 1772. He then bought scientific instruments (microscopes, a barometer and hygrometer), surveying tools, and draftsmen's tools, and sailed for America in July of that year. He had decided never to marry or take up arms again and to become a gentleman farmer.

== Settling in New York ==
He bought a farm at King's Bridge, 13 miles north of New York City. While adjusting to his surroundings, Montgomery renewed his acquaintance with Janet Livingston, who later recounted that "politeness led him to make me a visit." After receiving permission from her father, Robert Livingston, he and Janet were married on 24 July 1773. Montgomery's marriage with Janet also led him to become a slave owner, as the Livingstons were a prominent slaveowning family in the region.

After their marriage, Montgomery leased his farm to a tenant. His wife's grandfather, Judge Beekman, gave them a cottage on the Post Road north of the Beekman Arms in Rhinebeck in which to reside. Montgomery bought some surrounding land and set to work fencing, ploughing fields, building a grain mill, and laying the foundation for a larger home called "Grasmere", though it was yet to be completed at the time of his death and the tiny cottage was his only residence in Rhinebeck. He said that he was "Never so happy in all my life", but followed that up by saying "This cannot last; it cannot last." Three months after their marriage, Janet told him of a dream she had in which Montgomery was killed in a duel by his brother. Montgomery replied by saying "I have always told you that my happiness is not lasting ... Let us enjoy it as long as we may and leave the rest to God."

Because Montgomery was now tied to the Livingston family, who supported the Patriot cause, he began to turn against the British government, seeing himself as an American instead of an Englishman. He came to believe that the British government was being oppressive and was acting like a tyrannical parent-state.

=== New York Provincial Congress ===
On 16 May 1775, Montgomery was elected as one of the ten deputies to represent Dutchess County in the New York Provincial Congress. Although Montgomery had only lived in New York for two years and had not sought political involvement, he was well known and respected in the area and he felt obliged to attend. He was reluctant to go, but nonetheless went to New York City, 80 miles south of Rhinebeck.

The first session began on 22 May. On 26 May 97 delegates, including Montgomery, signed a resolution legitimizing its authority. Montgomery's views were those of a moderate Patriot. He believed that the British Government was wrong, but hoped for an honorable reconciliation. Gradually, the faction of the Congress that remained loyal to the King lost its influence, with some not participating on a regular basis. Montgomery was selected to serve in a site selection committee to decide the placement of military defensive positions in New York, and was also involved in organizing the provincial militia and securing its supplies.

== American Revolution ==
=== Appointment ===
After the appointment of George Washington as Commander-in-Chief of the newly formed Continental Army on 15 June 1775, the Second Continental Congress asked the New York Provincial Government to select two men for service in the army. One would be a major general, the other a brigadier general. The assembly favored Philip Schuyler as the major general. Montgomery expressed concern over this, as he did not believe that Schuyler had enough combat experience for such an appointment. Montgomery wrote that "Phil Schuyler was mentioned to me ... His consequence in the province makes him a fit subject for an important trust – but has he strong nerves? I could wish to have that point well ascertained with respect to any man so employed." Although Montgomery knew he was under consideration for brigadier general, he did not publicly show any desire for the appointment. Nonetheless, Schuyler was appointed major general, and Montgomery brigadier general, on 22 June. Montgomery was ranked second in command of all the brigadier generals. In view of this appointment, he said, "The Congress having done me the honor of electing me brigadier-general in their service, is an event which must put an end, for awhile, perhaps for ever, to the quiet scheme of life I had prescribed for myself; for, though entirely unexpected and undesired by me, the will of an oppressed people, compelled to choose between liberty and slavery, must be obeyed."

The American invasion of Canada.

=== Plan ===
On 25 June, George Washington passed through New York City on his way to Boston. Washington assigned Montgomery as deputy commander under Schuyler. A few days later, Schuyler received orders from the Continental Congress to invade Canada. The idea was that the army was to invade Quebec, where the Hudson River and the northern lakes could supply the army. A force was quickly assembled at Fort Ticonderoga, and Schuyler left to take command of the army on 4 July. Montgomery stayed in Albany for several more weeks making the final arrangements for the invasion. His wife followed him as far north as Saratoga, where he told her "You shall never have cause to blush for your Montgomery."

Through July and early August, Montgomery and Schuyler continued to organize their force, raising the men and materials needed for an invasion. While they organized, Washington decided to expand the invasion, ordering Benedict Arnold to lead another invasion force that would invade Quebec from Maine. It was to join with Schuyler's army outside Quebec City, where they would launch a joint attack on to the city.

=== Invasion of Quebec ===
In August, Schuyler left to meet with representatives of the Iroquois Confederacy in order to keep them neutral during the invasion, leaving Montgomery in command of the forces at Fort Ticonderoga. While Schuyler was away, Montgomery received intelligence that the British were building two gunboats on Lake Champlain, which, when complete, would give the British military access to the lake. Without asking permission from Schuyler, he moved 1,200 men north on the schooner Liberty and the sloop Enterprise. Montgomery wrote a letter to Schuyler, explaining the situation.

The Embarkation of Montgomery's troops at Crown Point.

Schuyler returned to Fort Ticonderoga on 30 August, ordered an additional 800 men to reinforce Montgomery, and then, despite being ill, set out to join Montgomery. He caught up with Montgomery on 4 September on Isle La Motte, where he assumed command and ordered the advance to continue to Île aux Noix, a small island in the Richelieu River. Schuyler, whose health was poor, drafted a proclamation in which he called the Canadians "Friends and Countrymen", asking them to help expel the British from Canada.

On 6 September, Montgomery led a probing force to Fort St. Johns, the key to the British defense of Montreal. Montgomery led the main body of troops toward the fort through a marshy and heavily wooded area. A flanking party led by Captain Matthew Mead was ambushed by 100 Native Americans allied to the British. The party held its ground, forcing the ambushing Natives to fall back to the fort. Montgomery, fearing that the British force was larger than he had anticipated, called off operations for the rest of the day and withdrew his force to a spot beyond the range of the British guns. Believing that the fort could not be captured quickly, Schuyler recalled Montgomery's force and fortified Île aux Noix.

Schuyler's health declined, so Montgomery assumed command of the daily functions of the army. On 10 September, a larger force of 1,700 men led by Montgomery moved toward the fort. In the swampy area around the fort, it was so dark that two parties of Americans ran into each other; each feared the other to be the British, and both fled. Montgomery ran to intercept them and ended the flight. As they advanced toward the fort, the force came under British grapeshot fire. One party of Americans attacked the British breastworks, inflicting 2 casualties, after which they fell back. The next morning, Montgomery called a council of war, in which it was agreed to make another attack on the fort. However, word spread that a British warship was advancing up the river, and half the New England troops fled out of fright. Montgomery, believing his force could no longer take the fort, retreated back to Île aux Noix. Montgomery, furious at the flight of the New England troops, asked Schuyler to appoint a court-martial board. Meanwhile, Schuyler's health had not improved. He left for Ticonderoga on the 16th to recover, giving full control of the operation to Montgomery.

=== Siege of St. Johns ===
Outside of Fort Saint-Jean (Quebec), Montgomery continued to receive reinforcements. He granted leaves to commanders who he felt were not fit for their position. He said "I hope we shall have none left but fighting men on whom I can rely."

On 16 September, Montgomery organized another expedition against the British fort. In total, he had 1,400 men. He sent a naval component, with 1 schooner, 1 sloop, and 10 bateaux with 350 troops to counter any move by the British warship, Royal Savage. Montgomery took the rest of his force and sailed up the river, landing near St. Johns on 17 September. The British garrison was 725 men commanded by Major Charles Preston, who just 3 years earlier had been Montgomery's superior officer in the British Army.

Montgomery and his troops spent the first night near the landing area, under light fire from the British guns. The next morning, he ordered Major Timothy Bedel to occupy a position north of the fort, but when Montgomery saw that his men were apprehensive, he chose to lead the mission himself. As Montgomery led his troops, they came upon a fight between British troops and another American party. Montgomery took command of the skirmish and forced the British party back into the fort. Montgomery sent Bedel with a force to entrench themselves about a mile north of the fort. Montgomery then put other troops around the fort and began a siege.

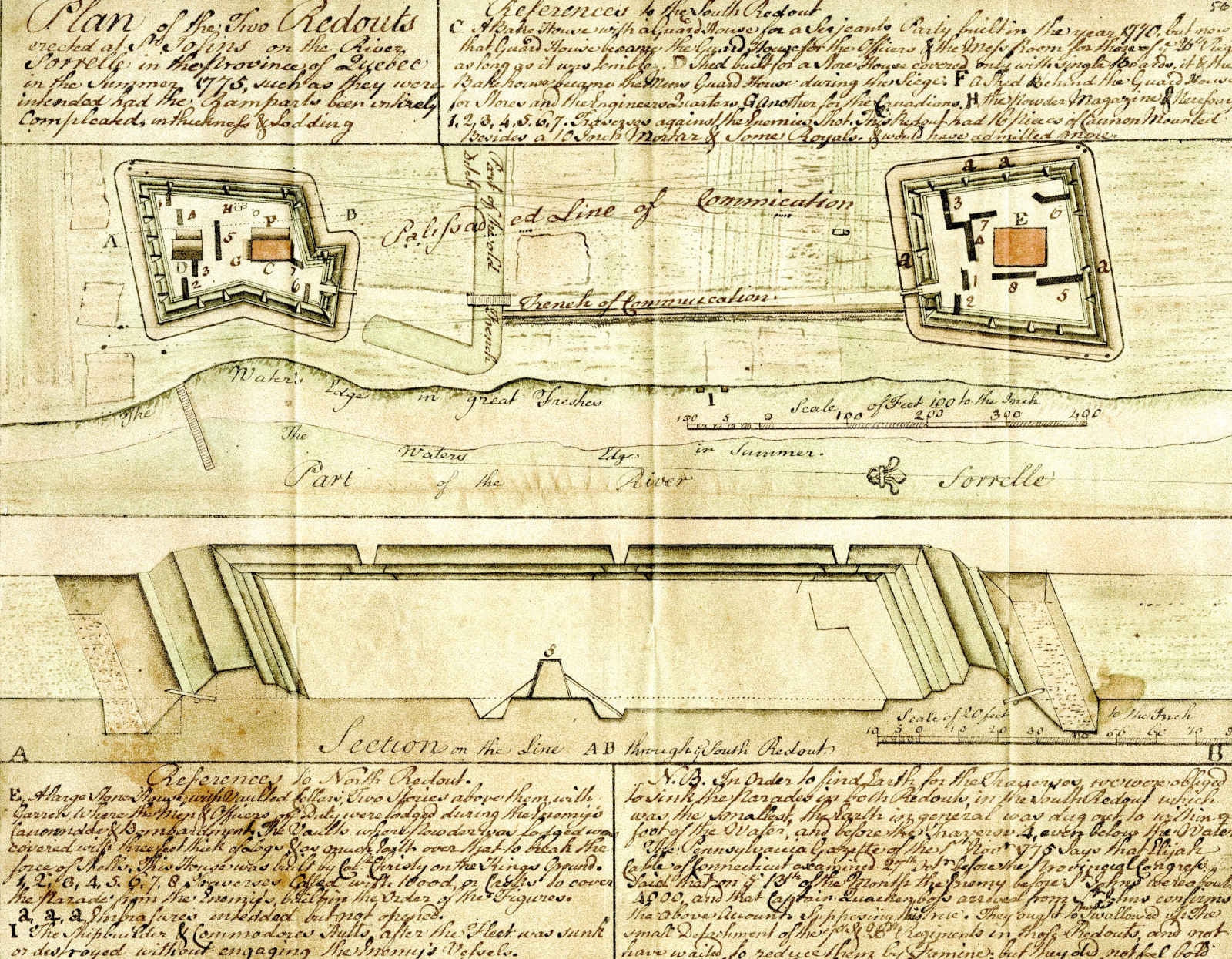
A map of Fort St. Johns

Preston and the British forces had many more guns and much more ammunition than the Americans and thus achieved a 10-to-1 firepower advantage for the first few weeks. Montgomery concentrated his forces on improving the siege works. Within several days they had erected 2 batteries under consistent fire from the fort. On 22 September, Montgomery was nearly killed while inspecting the breastworks when a cannonball from the fort shot past him, ripping his skirt and knocking him off the breastwork, although he landed on his feet. The troops observed that this "did not seem to hurt or frighten him."

The Americans continued to receive armaments from Ticonderoga, with guns arriving on 21 September and also on 5 October. However, the artillery were positioned too far away to do much damage to the fort. With the arrival of the new guns, Montgomery planned to move the emphasis of the bombardment from the east side of the fort to the north side, where they would be closer. However, his officers unanimously rejected this plan, fearing that many men would desert due to the increased danger. Montgomery ordered that a new battery be built where the Royal Savage could be threatened. On 14 October, the battery was completed and then used to sink the British ship.

In mid-October, James Livingston, an American expatriate living near Chambly (and a relative of Montgomery's wife Janet), suggested to Montgomery that he might have better success attacking Fort Chambly, which, about 10 miles downstream, was weaker than St. Jean. Montgomery approved of the idea and ordered 350 men to take Chambly. On the night of 16 October, two American guns were slipped past Fort St. Jean and moved towards Chambly. The next morning, these guns opened fire on Chambly. After two days of bombardment, holes were driven into the fort's walls and the chimney had been knocked down. The British commander surrendered the fort, along with 6 tons of gunpowder and 83 men. Montgomery sent the colors of the 7th Royal Fusiliers, who had been defending the fort, to Schuyler, the first standards of a British regiment captured in the war. Washington sent a letter of congratulations to Montgomery and commented that he hoped "that his next letter be dated from Montreal."

The capture of Chambly improved morale in the ranks of Montgomery's army, so much so that he went through with his plan to establish a battery north of Fort St. Jean, this time without opposition. While the Americans were constructing the batteries, the British heavily bombarded the American workers, but this resulted in few casualties. General Guy Carleton, commanding the British forces at Montreal, realized that the situation at Fort St. Jean was becoming desperate. He personally led a relief force at the end of October, but American forces successfully prevented it from crossing the Saint Lawrence River south of Montreal.

On 1 November, the new batteries erected north of the fort were complete. The Americans began to fire at the fort and continued to do so throughout the rest of the day. The British guns fired back, but were less effective. The American guns caused few casualties, but inflicted heavy structural damage inside of the fort. Morale in the besieged garrison fell as the bombardment (and declining rations) took their toll. At sundown, Montgomery ordered the firing to stop and sent a prisoner captured at Chambly inside with a letter asking for the garrison's surrender. A messenger sent from Carleton to Preston was captured during the night, in which Carleton ordered that Preston continue to hold out. On 2 November, the British agreed to surrender with full military honors. They marched out of the fort on 3 November, and were sent into the colonies, where they were interned. The British had suffered 20 killed and 23 wounded, while the Americans had only five killed and six wounded throughout the siege.

=== Montreal to Quebec ===
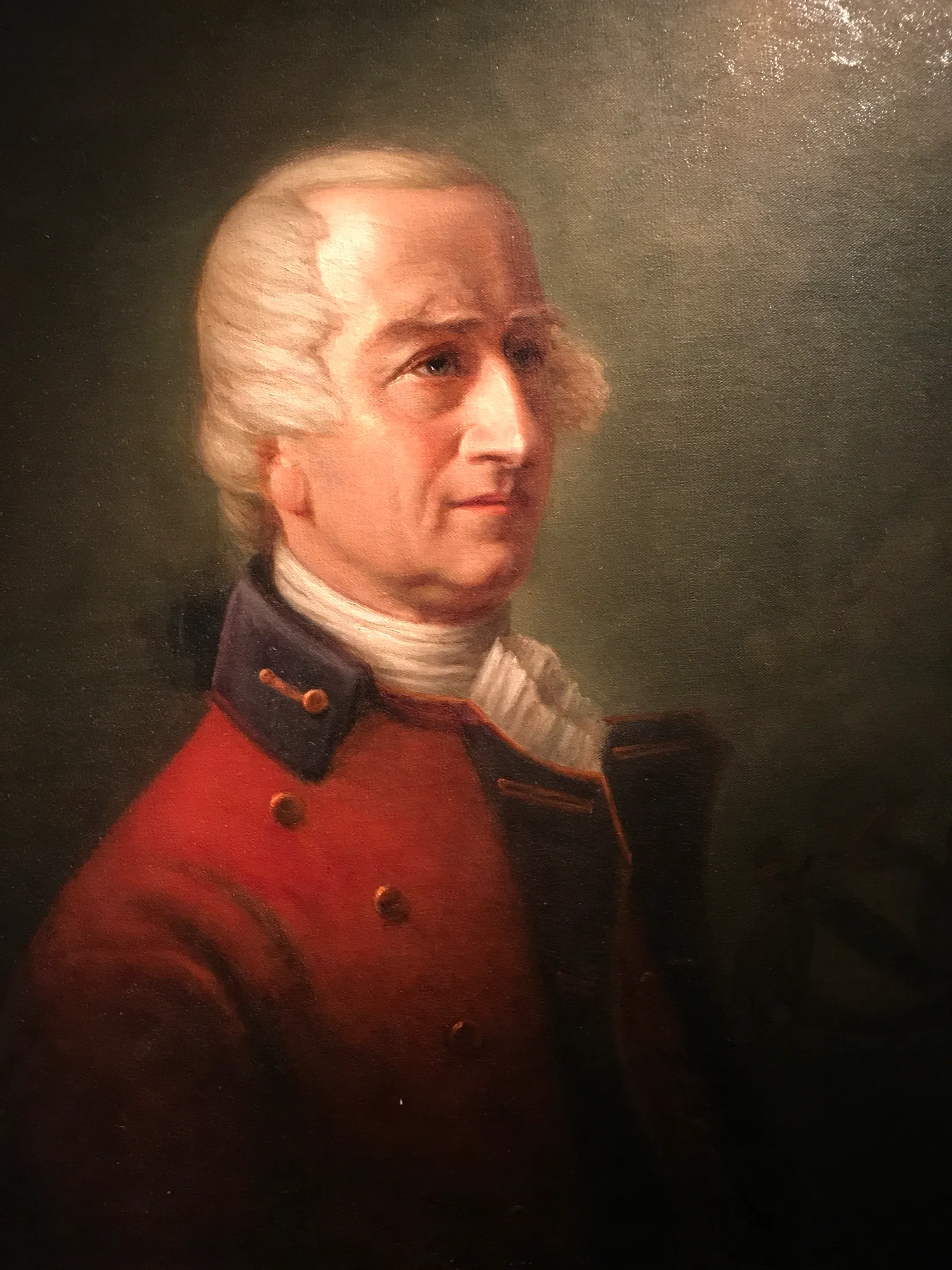
General Guy Carleton opposed Montgomery at Quebec.

Montgomery then turned the army toward Montreal. The march was difficult as there was snow, water, and ice on the ground and a winter storm struck several days after their departure. In an attempt to stop an escape of British troops from Montreal to Quebec, Montgomery sent a detachment to Sorel where the force briefly clashed with British troops. The British troops quickly withdrew to their vessels in the St. Lawrence River. When Montgomery and the main army reached the outskirts of the city, Montgomery sent a messenger in demanding the surrender of the city or they would suffer bombardment. While negotiations for the city's surrender took place, Carleton fled down the St. Lawrence River in a small flotilla of ships. The city surrendered on 13 November, and Montgomery and his army marched into the city without a shot being fired.

On 19 November, the British flotilla was captured, but Carleton narrowly escaped and made his way to Quebec City. Montgomery's kind treatment toward the captured British prisoners caused several officers to express their concern. Montgomery saw this as a challenge to his authority and this, along with the lack of discipline in the army, caused Montgomery to threaten resignation. Letters from Washington in which Washington also expressed his troubles with the discipline of troops convinced Montgomery to continue his command.

On 28 November, Montgomery and 300 men went aboard some of the captured ships and began to sail to Quebec City. On 2 December, Montgomery joined Benedict Arnold's force at Pointe aux Trembles, 18 miles upriver from Quebec. On his arrival, Arnold turned over command of his forces to Montgomery. On 3 December, Montgomery gave Arnold's men, who had marched through the Maine wilderness to Quebec City and suffered much hardship along the way, much-needed supplies, including clothing and other winter supplies taken from the captured British ships. The next day, the army moved toward the city; when they arrived, Montgomery ordered the city to be surrounded. On 7 December, Montgomery sent an ultimatum to Carleton, demanding the surrender of the city. Carleton burned the letter. Several days later, Montgomery sent a letter into the city appealing the merchants telling them that they had come to liberate the civilians of Quebec. However, Carleton discovered the plan and quickly had the messenger arrested. Montgomery, wanting his message to reach the inhabitants of the city, then sent the proclamation over the wall with bows and arrows.

=== Attack and death ===
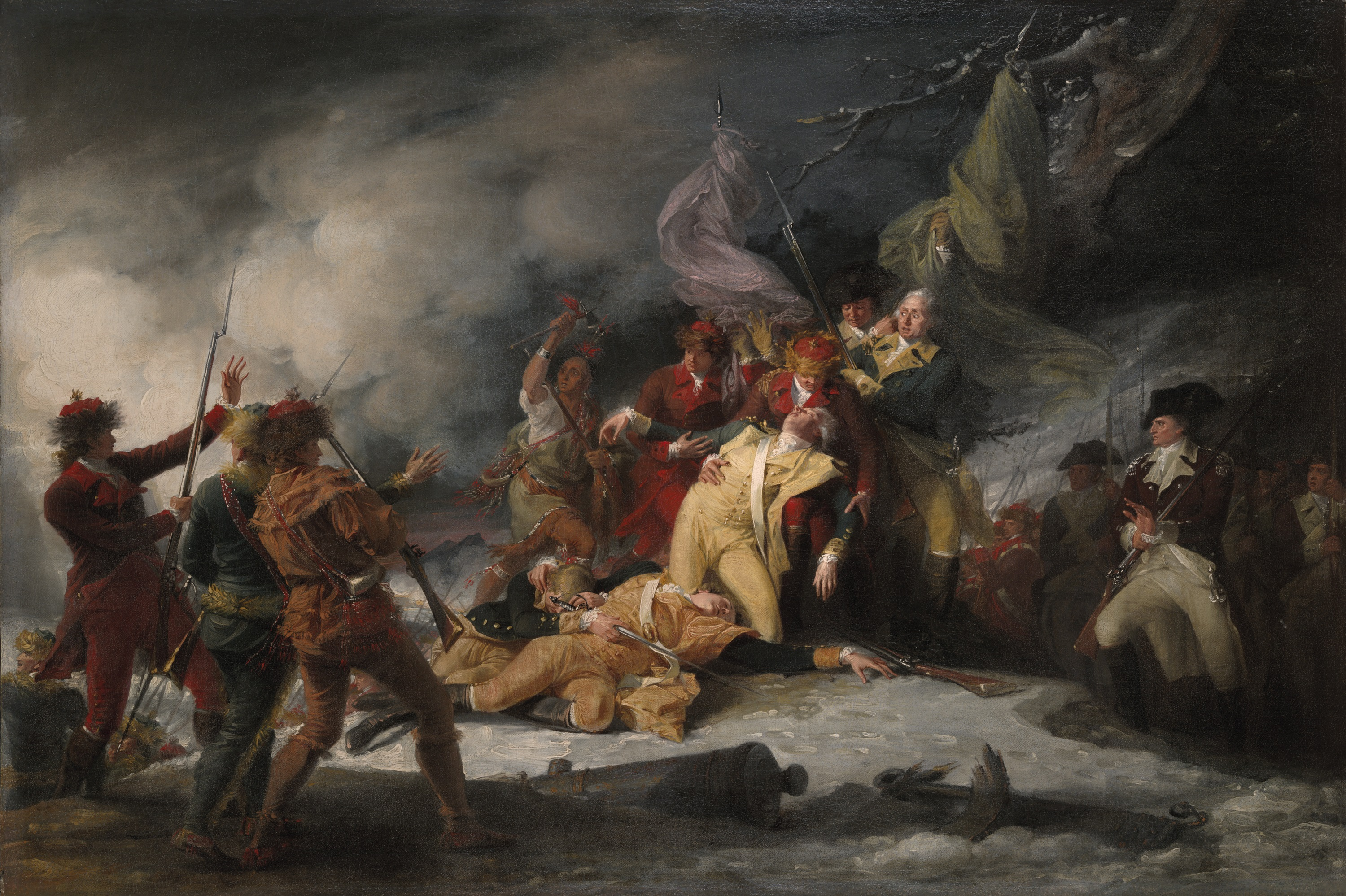
The Death of General Montgomery in the Attack on Quebec, December 31, 1775, John Trumbull, 1786

Unknown to Montgomery, he was promoted to major general on 9 December for his victories at St. Johns and Montreal. After Montgomery was unable to convince Carleton to surrender, he placed several mortars a few hundred yards outside the walls of the city. The shelling of the city began on 9 December, but after several days it had failed to make a serious impact on the walls, the garrison, or the civilian population. With the shelling having little effect, Montgomery ordered the emplacement of another battery closer towards the city walls, on the Plains of Abraham, despite the fact it offered little natural cover from returning fire. On 15 December, the new batteries were ready and Montgomery sent a party of men under the flag of truce to ask for the city's surrender. However, they were turned away. Montgomery then resumed firing on the city, but the effect was little better. When the new batteries were hit by more effective fire from the British, Montgomery ordered their evacuation.

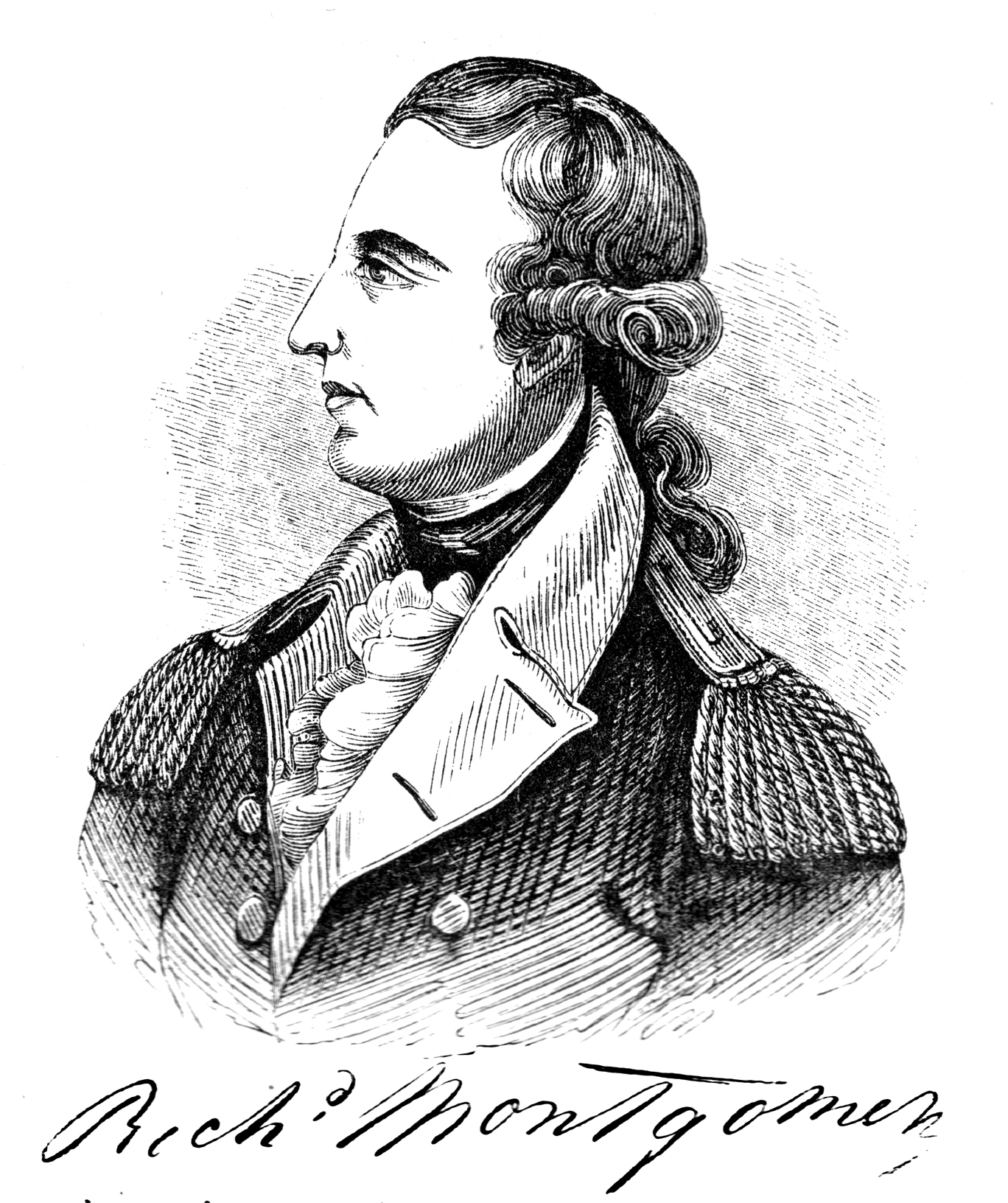
MGen Richard Montgomery with autograph in 1775

As the bombardment of the city proved to be unsuccessful, Montgomery then began to plan for an assault. Montgomery was to assault the Lower Town district (Saint-Roch), the part of the city near the river shore, while Arnold was to attack and take the Cape Diamond Bastion, a strong part of the city walls on the highest point of the rocky promontory. Montgomery believed that they should attack during a stormy night, therefore the British would not be able to see them. On 27 December, the weather became stormy, and Montgomery ordered that the men prepare to attack. However, the storm soon subsided and Montgomery called off the attack. As Montgomery waited for a storm, he was forced to revise his plans, because a deserter communicated the original plan to the defenders. In the new plan, Montgomery would attack the Lower Town from the south and Arnold would attack the Lower Town from the north. After breaking through the walls, Montgomery and Arnold would meet up in the city and then attack and take the Upper Town, causing resistance to collapse. To increase their chance of surprise, Montgomery planned two feints. One detachment of troops (the 1st Canadian Regiment under James Livingston) would set fire to one of the gates while another (under the command of Jacob Brown) would engage the guard at Cape Diamond Bastion and fire rockets to signal the start of the attack. While the feints were conducted, artillery would fire into the city. Although Montgomery was reluctant to attack, enlistments for Arnold's men were expiring on 1 January, and he was concerned about losing their services.

On the night of 30 December, a snowstorm struck. Montgomery issued the order to attack and the Americans began to move towards their designated positions. At 4:00 a.m., Montgomery saw the rocket flares and began to move his men around the city towards the lower town. Although the rockets were to signal the attack, they also alerted the British of the impending attack, and the city's defenders rushed to their posts. Montgomery personally led the march to the Lower Town, as they descended the steep slippery cliffs outside the city walls. At 6:00 a.m., Montgomery's force reached a palisade at the edge of the Lower Town, which they had to saw through. After they sawed through a second palisade, Montgomery led the advance party through the opening. Seeing a two-story blockhouse down the street, Montgomery led the troops toward it, encouraging the men by drawing his sword and shouting, "Come on, my good soldiers, your General calls upon you to come on." When the Americans were about 50 yards (46 m) away, the British forces in the blockhouse (30 Canadian militia and some seamen), opened fire with cannon, musket, and grapeshot. Montgomery was killed with grapeshot through the head and both thighs. Also killed in the burst of gunfire were Captains John Macpherson and Jacob Cheesman.

With the death of Montgomery, his attack fell apart. Colonel Donald Campbell, the surviving officer, ordered a somewhat panicked retreat. One of Montgomery's staff officers, Aaron Burr, briefly attempted to drag his commander's body to friendly lines, but was foiled by the snow as well as Montgomery's dead weight. Without Montgomery's assistance, Arnold's attack, after initial success, fell apart. Arnold was wounded in the leg, and a large number of his troops were captured, including Daniel Morgan.

=== Funeral ===
On 1 January 1776, the British started collecting bodies of the deceased and soon found the body of a high-ranking officer of the American colonial army. After being brought to General Carleton, an American prisoner confirmed that the body was that of Richard Montgomery.

Once Montgomery's death was announced, Benedict Arnold assumed command of the American colonial forces. As Montgomery was a well-respected man on both sides of the battlefield, Carleton ordered that he be buried with dignity, but not with too much fanfare. At sunset on 4 January 1776, Montgomery's remains were put to rest. During his burial, American prisoners acknowledged Montgomery as a "beloved general" with "heroic bravery" and "suavity of manners" who held the "confidence of the whole army."

== Mourning ==
Schuyler and Washington were devastated upon hearing of Montgomery's death. Schuyler believed that without Montgomery, victory in Canada was not possible. He wrote to Congress and Washington that "My amiable friend, the gallant Montgomery, is no more; the brave Arnold is wounded; and we have met a severe check, in an unsuccessful attempt on Quebec, May Heaven be graciously pleased that the misfortune may terminate here." Washington wrote to Schuyler, "In the death of this gentleman, America has sustained a heavy loss, as he had approved himself a steady friend to her rights and of ability to render her the most essential services." Congress reacted to Montgomery's death by trying to keep the loss as quiet as possible. They feared the news would lower the morale of the troops and civilians.

On 25 January 1776, Congress approved the establishment of a monument in memory of Montgomery. A state memorial service was also scheduled and carried out on 19 February 1776. Throughout the thirteen colonies, Montgomery was viewed as a hero, and Patriots tried to use his death to promote their cause in the war. Montgomery's name was used very often in literature; among the authors who used his name was Thomas Paine. The poet Ann Eliza Bleecker wrote an "Elegy on the death of Gen. Montgomery" in his memory.

Montgomery was also mourned in Britain. Whigs attempted to use his death to show the failure of the British policies on the American Colonies. Prime Minister Lord North acknowledged Montgomery's military ability but said "I cannot join in lamenting the death of Montgomery as a public loss. Curse on his virtues! They've undone his country. He was brave, he was able, he was humane, he was generous, but still, he was only a brave, able, humane, and generous rebel." Newspapers in London paid tribute to Montgomery, with the Evening Post bordering its 12 March edition in black as a sign of mourning.

== Aftermath ==
Janet would outlive Montgomery by 53 years. Janet always referred to him as "my general" or "my soldier" and guarded his reputation. After his death, Janet moved to the house near Rhinebeck on which Montgomery had begun work before the war. Janet remained interested in politics for the rest of the war and was always a harsh critic of Loyalists. After the war, former Continental Army general Horatio Gates proposed marriage to her, but she declined. In 1789, Janet stopped in New York City on her way to visit some of Montgomery's relatives in Ireland. She attended Washington's inaugural ball that followed his swearing as president, and also visited Washington and his family several times more.

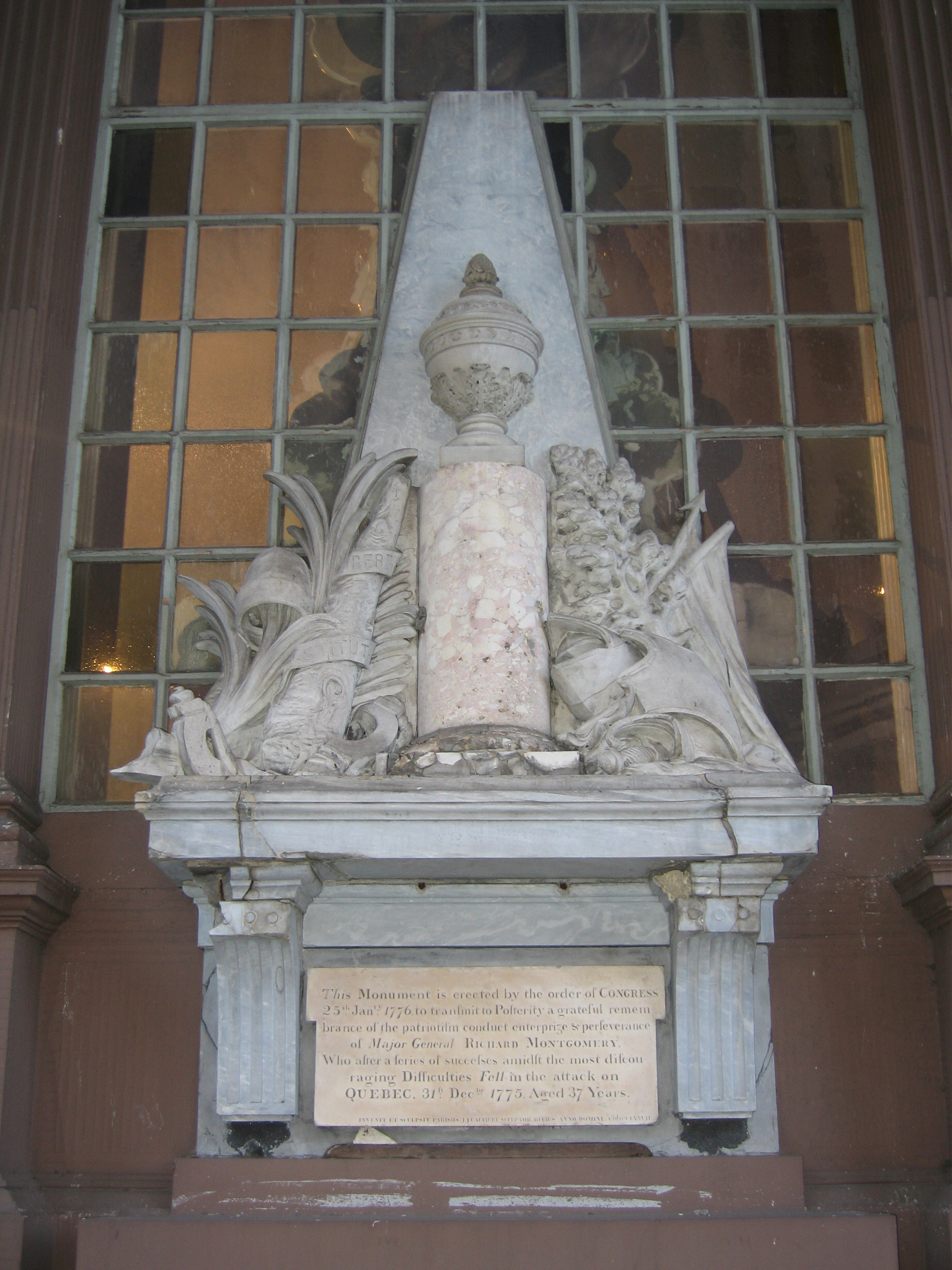
Montgomery monument sculpted by Jean-Jacques Caffieri in 1777, installed at St. Paul's Chapel in 1787

In 1818, Stephen van Rensselaer, Governor of New York, obtained permission for Montgomery's remains to be moved from Quebec to New York. In June 1818, Montgomery's remains set off for New York City. On 4 July they arrived in Albany and took a boat down the Hudson to New York City. Janet stood out on her porch and watched the boat bring Montgomery's remains down the river, fainting at the sight. When his remains arrived in New York City, 5,000 people attended the procession. His remains were interred on 8 July, next to his monument at St. Paul's Chapel in Manhattan, which had been completed in 1776 and, at the time, was under the care of Joseph Hewes in North Carolina. Janet was pleased with the ceremony and wrote, "What more could I wish than the high honor that has been conferred on the ashes of my poor soldier."

Years later, when Andrew Jackson was corresponding with Edward Livingston he wrote "Present me in the most respectful terms to your aged sister [Janet]. Says to her, if I ever should be within one hundred miles of her dwelling I will visit and have the high honor of shaking by the hand the revered relict of the patriotic Genrl. Montgomery, who will ever live in the hearts of his countrymen." Three months after this letter, Janet died, on 6 November 1824.

== Memorials ==
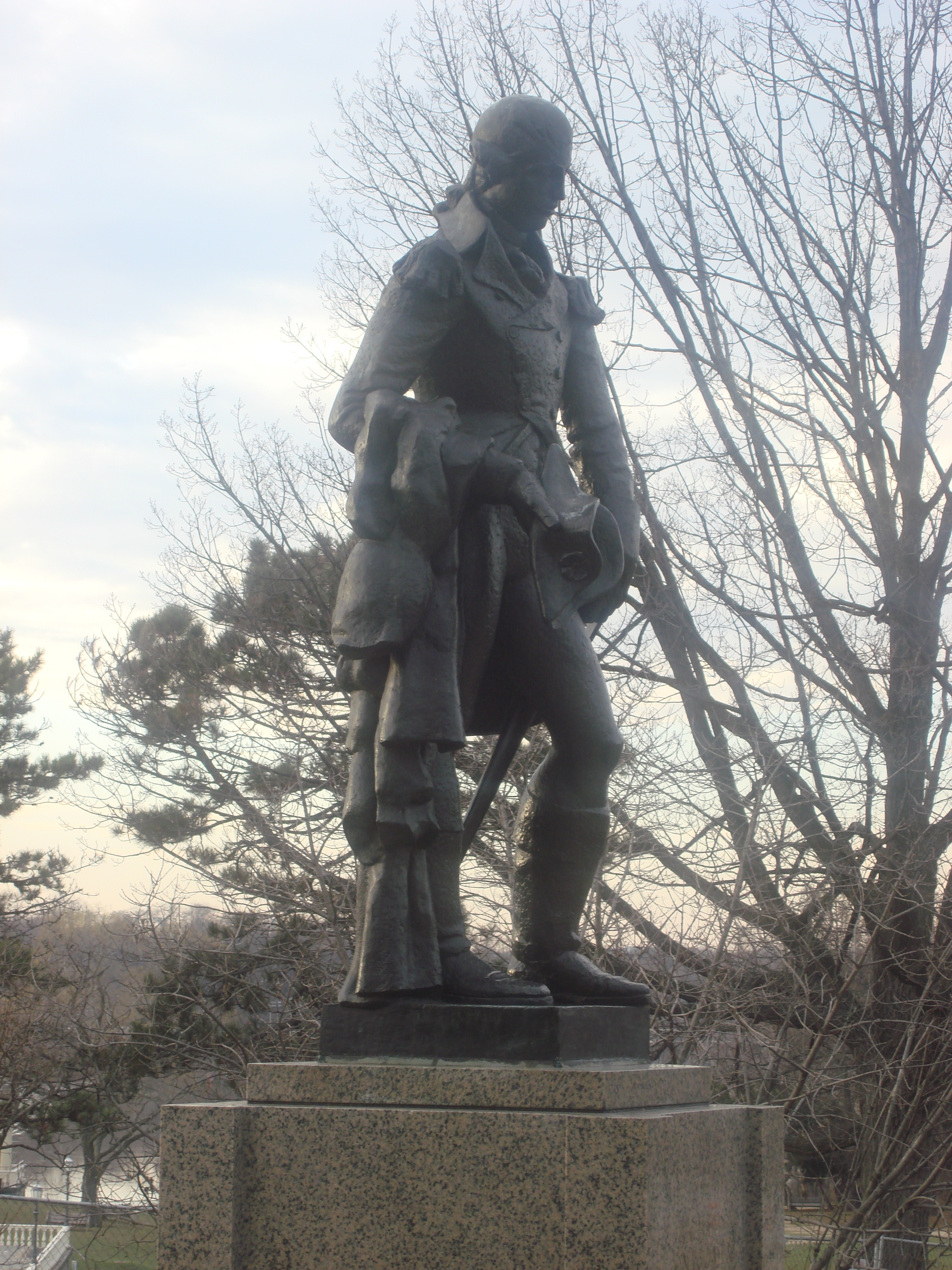
A statue honoring Montgomery near the Philadelphia Museum of Art in Philadelphia

Montgomery's home in Rhinebeck, New York, is now the General Richard and Janet Livingston Montgomery House, a historic house museum moved from Montgomery Street to 77 Livingston Street. The oldest structure in the Village of Rhinebeck, the building is also used for monthly meetings of the Chancellor Livingston Chapter of the Daughters of the American Revolution.

=== Places ===
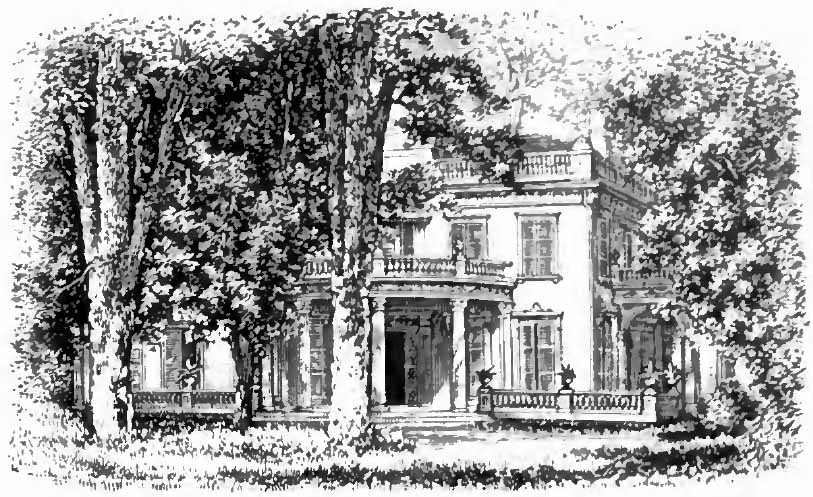
Montgomery Place in Barrytown, New York

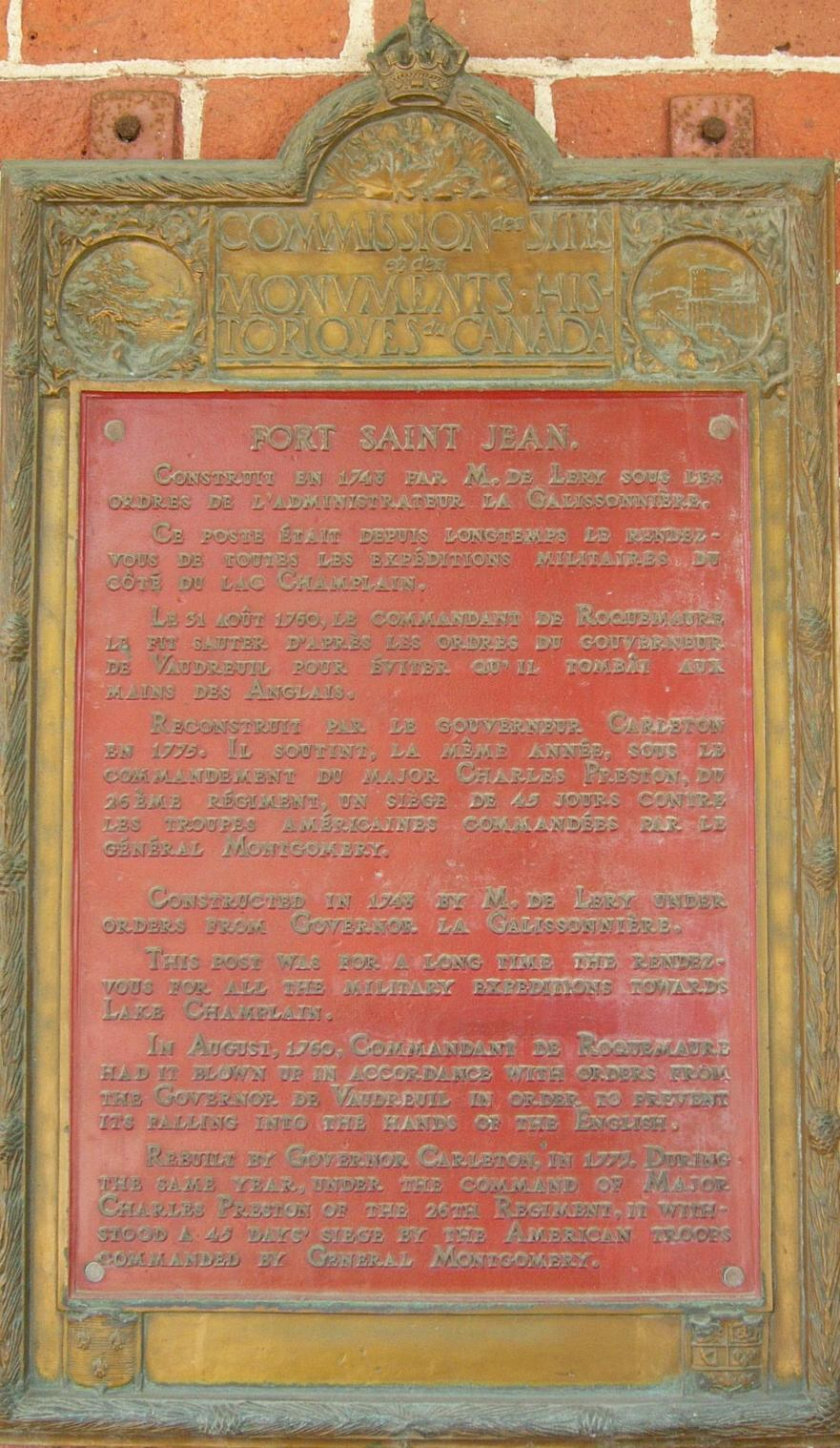
Plaque honoring Montgomery at Fort Saint-Jean in Quebec

Fort Montgomery, a massive masonry fortification mounting 125 guns on Lake Champlain, was named for the General.

Montgomery has several places named after him. Counties named for him are to be found in North Carolina, Missouri, Mississippi, Iowa, Arkansas, Illinois, Indiana, Kansas, Maryland, Ohio, Pennsylvania, New York, Georgia, Virginia, and Kentucky. Cities and towns named for him most notably include Montgomery, Alabama, that state's capital and third largest city, as well as Montgomery Township, New Jersey, Montgomery, New York, Montgomery, Ohio, Montgomery, Minnesota, and Montgomery, Vermont.

Richard Montgomery High School in Rockville, Maryland, bears his name, itself located in the county named after him, Montgomery County. Montgomery Place, a mansion in Barrytown, New York, was constructed in 1803 and named in his honor by his widow. General Montgomery had planned it before his departure from Grassmere in 1775, and construction was originally planned to start in 1776.

Montgomery Street in Savannah, Georgia and Montgomery Street in Trenton, New Jersey are both named for him.

=== Other Memorials ===
He is the namesake of the SS Richard Montgomery, a WWII Liberty ship which sank in the estuary of the River Thames in August, 1944. Much of her cargo of munitions is still on board the wreck.

== Sources ==
- Gabriel, Michael (2002). Major General Richard Montgomery. Fairleigh Dickinson University Press.
- Shelton, Hal (1994). General Richard Montgomery and the American Revolution. New York: New York University Press.
- Griswold, Rufus (1848). Washington and the Generals of the American Revolution, Volume 2. Cary and Hart. OCLC 8796707.
- "History of Montgomery Place". Archived from the original on 19 February 2009.
- Eccles, W.J. (2000). "Vaudreuil Biography". Dictionary of Canadian Biography Online.
- "Richard Montgomery".
