= Rhinebeck Central School District =

School district in New York, United States

Address
- 45 N Park Rd, Rhinebeck, NY Dutchess County, New York, 12572; United States

District information
- Type: Public
- Grades: KG-12
- Superintendent: Albert Cousins
- Schools: Chancellor Livingston Elementary School Bulkeley Middle School Rhinebeck Senior High School
- Budget: $32,814,000

Students and staff
- Students: 963
- Teachers: 107

Other information
- Website: https://www.rhinebeckcsd.org/

Rhinebeck Central School District (Rhinebeck CSD) is a school district primarily in the Town of Rhinebeck in the Hudson Valley region of the U.S. state of New York. The district is situated along the East Bank of the Hudson River and is approximately 90 miles north of New York City, and 61 miles south of Albany, approximately 26 miles south of Hudson, and 18 miles north of Poughkeepsie.

The district operates three schools; one primary, middle, and secondary school each. Throughout the district, there are about 963 students and 107 teachers. It entirely encompasses the Town of Rhinebeck, while also stretching into the towns of Red Hook, Milan, Clinton, and upper Hyde Park.

50% of the students are male, and the remaining 50 are female. 83% of the students are white, while the remaining 17% are a variety of races. 21% of the students come from low-income families, and 2% are learning English.

== History ==
From 1909 to 1913, Harry Carman served as the principal of Rhinebeck High School. The current principal is Dr. Edwin Davenport, alongside vice principal Marc Burg.

=== Superintendents ===
- Joseph Phelan (1999–2020)
- Albert Cousins (2020–present)

== District boundary ==
The district, located in Dutchess County, includes most of Rhinebeck town and portions of the following towns: Clinton, Hyde Park, Milan, and Red Hook. Within Rhinebeck town, the district includes Rhinebeck Village and the census-designated place (hamlet) of Rhinecliff.

== Schools ==
There are three schools in the district altogether. There is one elementary school, one Middle school, and one high school.

Schools in Rhinebeck CSD
School name	Location	Type	Students
Chancellor Livingston Elementary School	48 Knollwood Road	Primary school	392
Bulkeley Middle School	45 North Park Road	Middle school	211
Rhinebeck High School	45 North Park Road	Secondary school	315
