= List of places named after Franjo Tuđman =

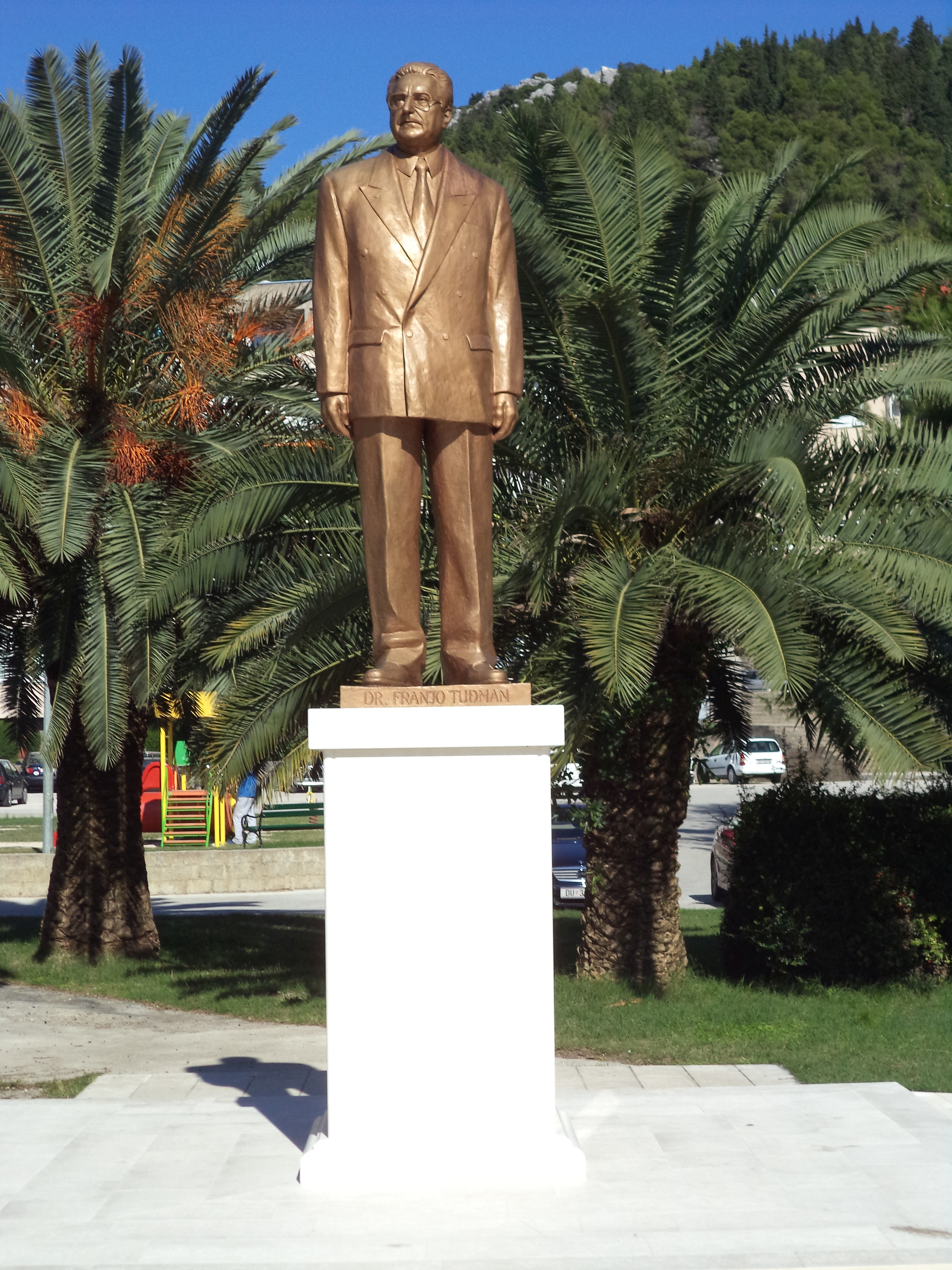
Monument in Ploče

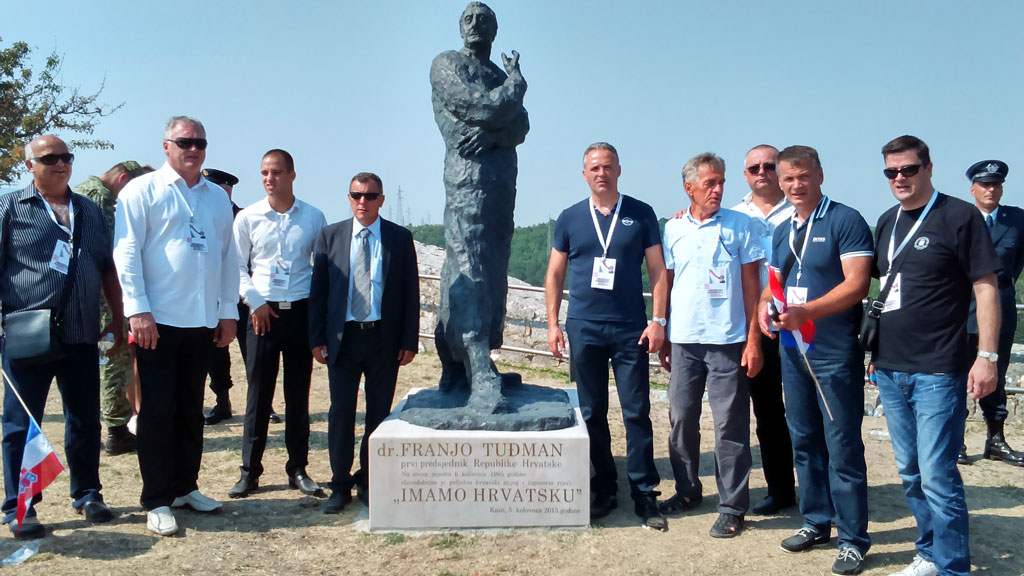
Monument on Knin Fortress

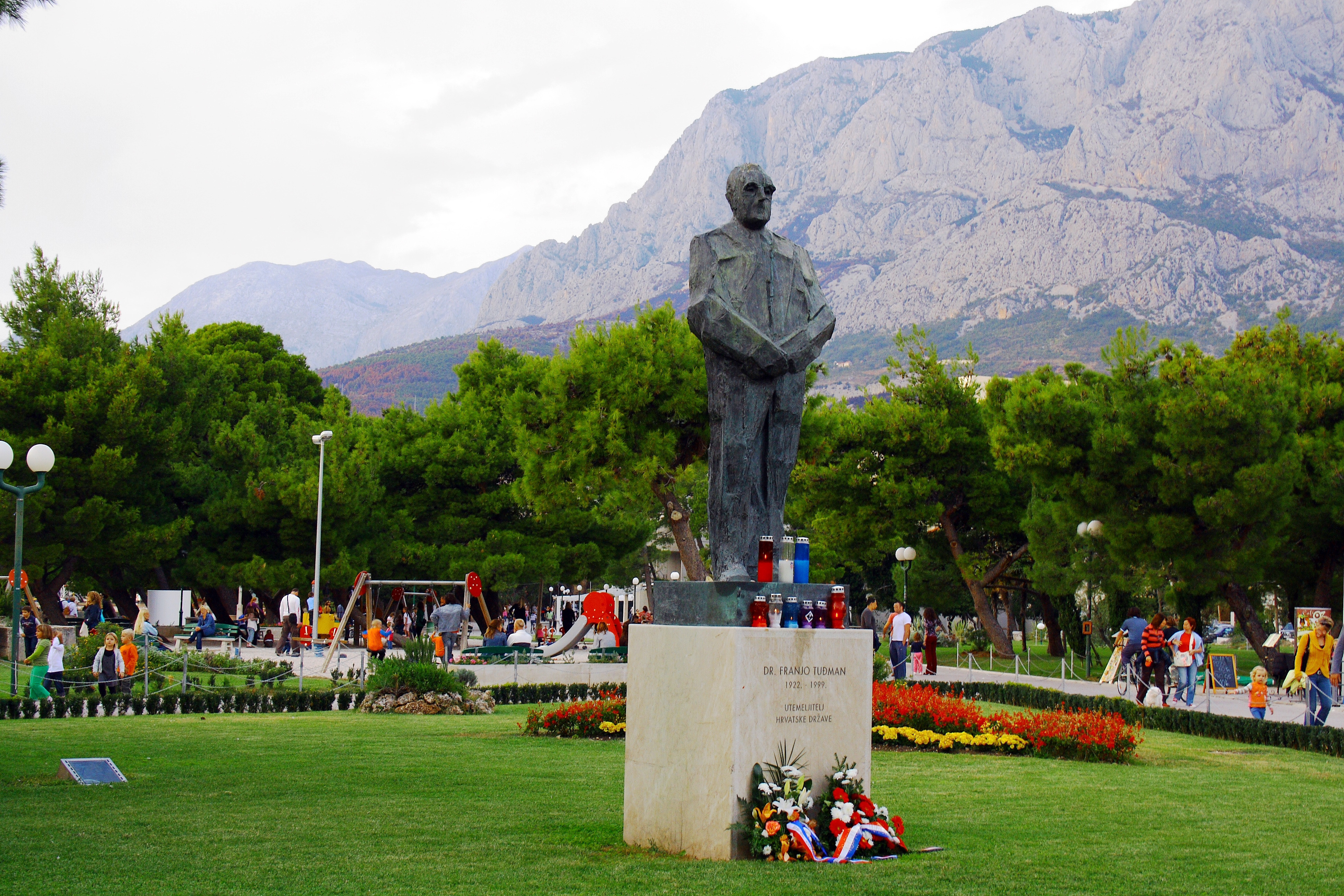
Monument in Makarska

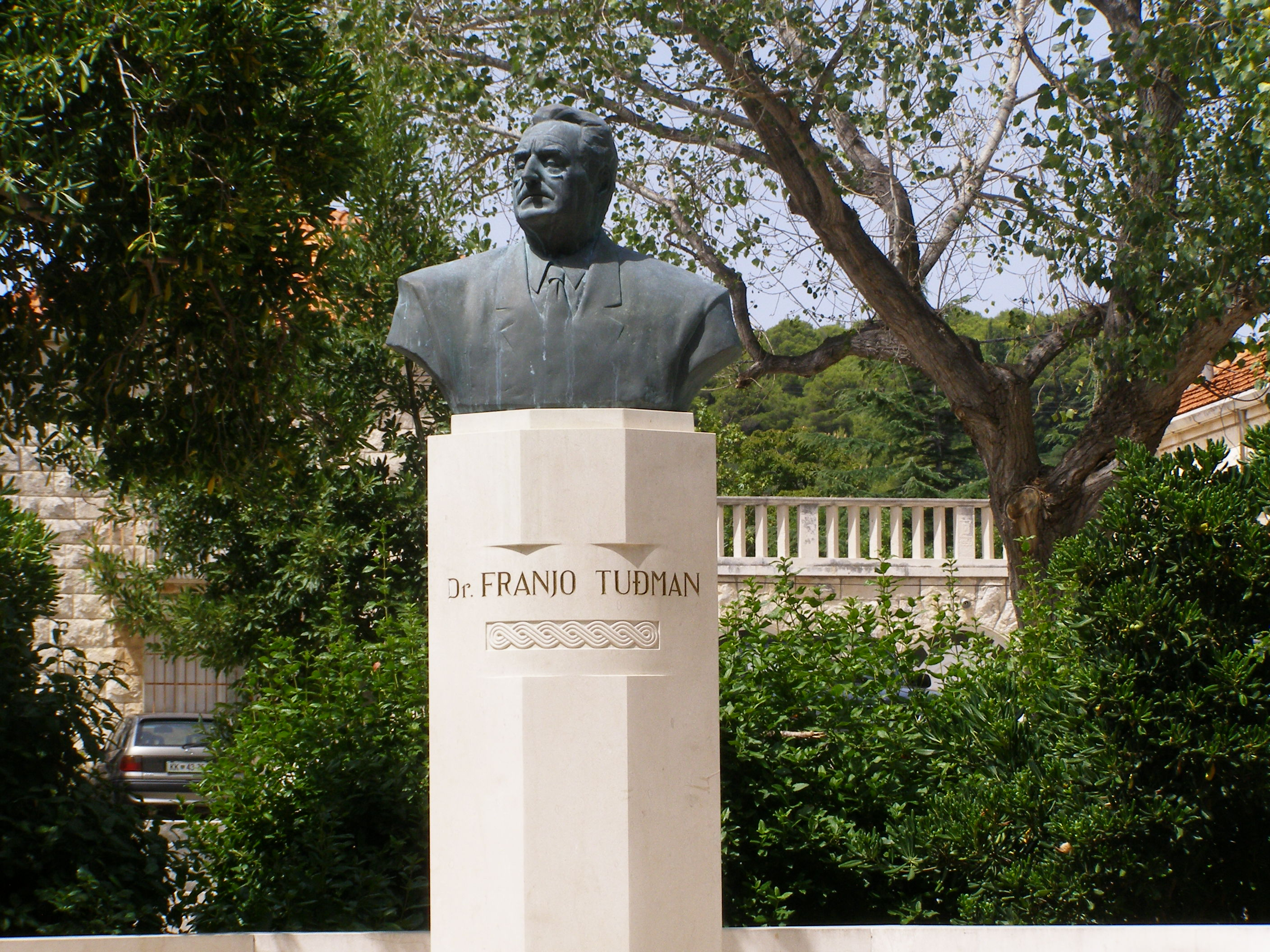
Monument in Selca, Brač

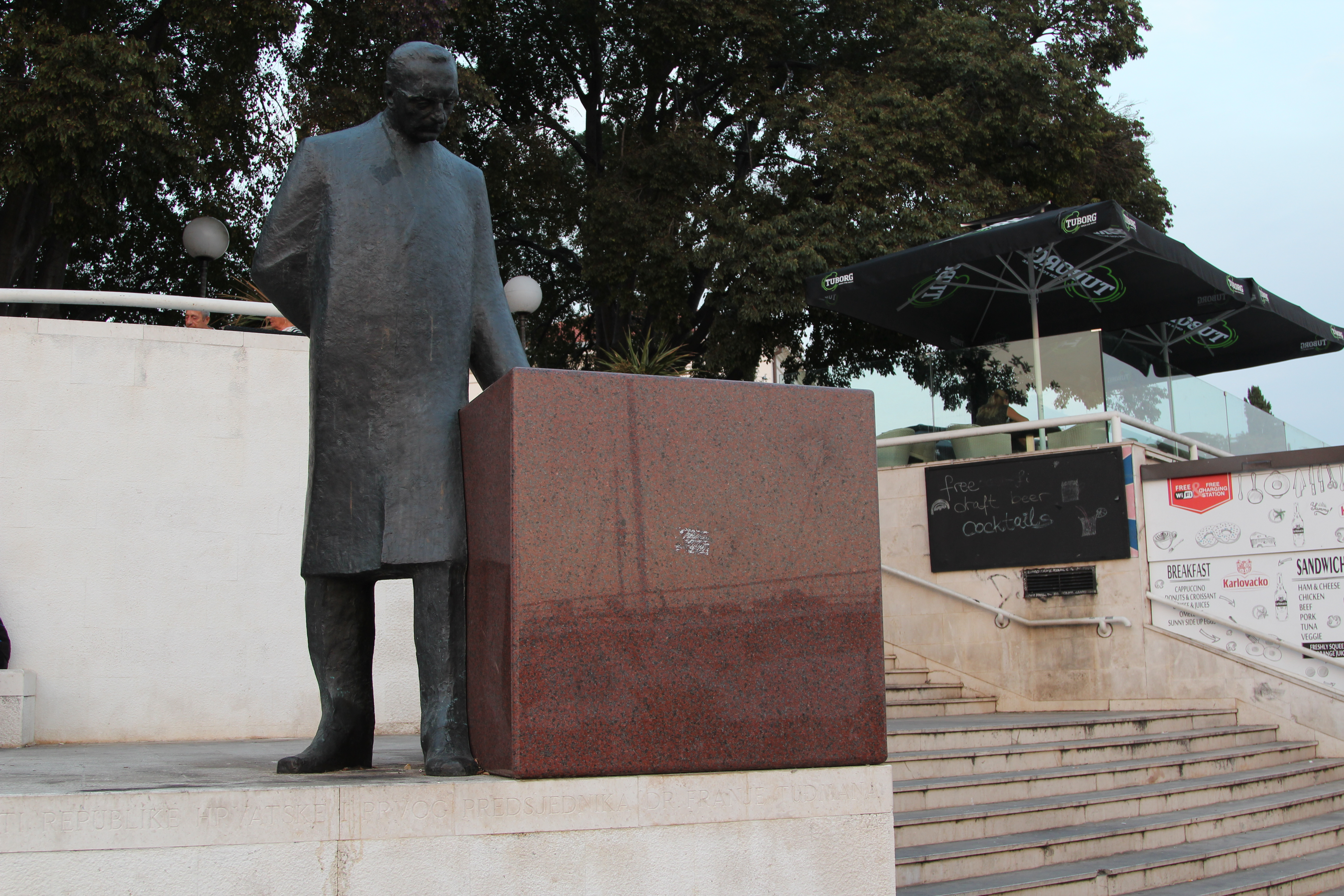
Monument in Split

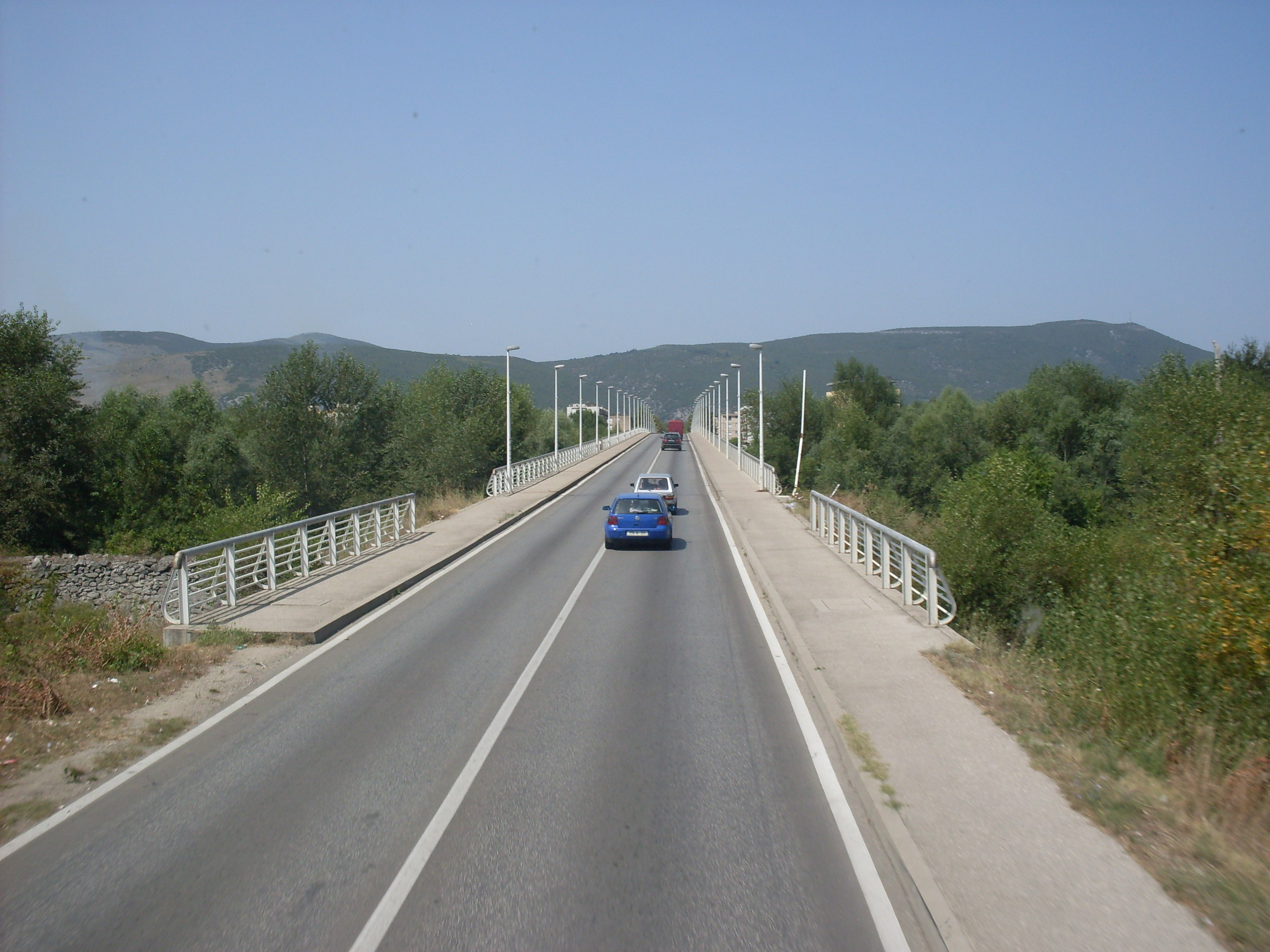
Bridge named after him in Čapljina

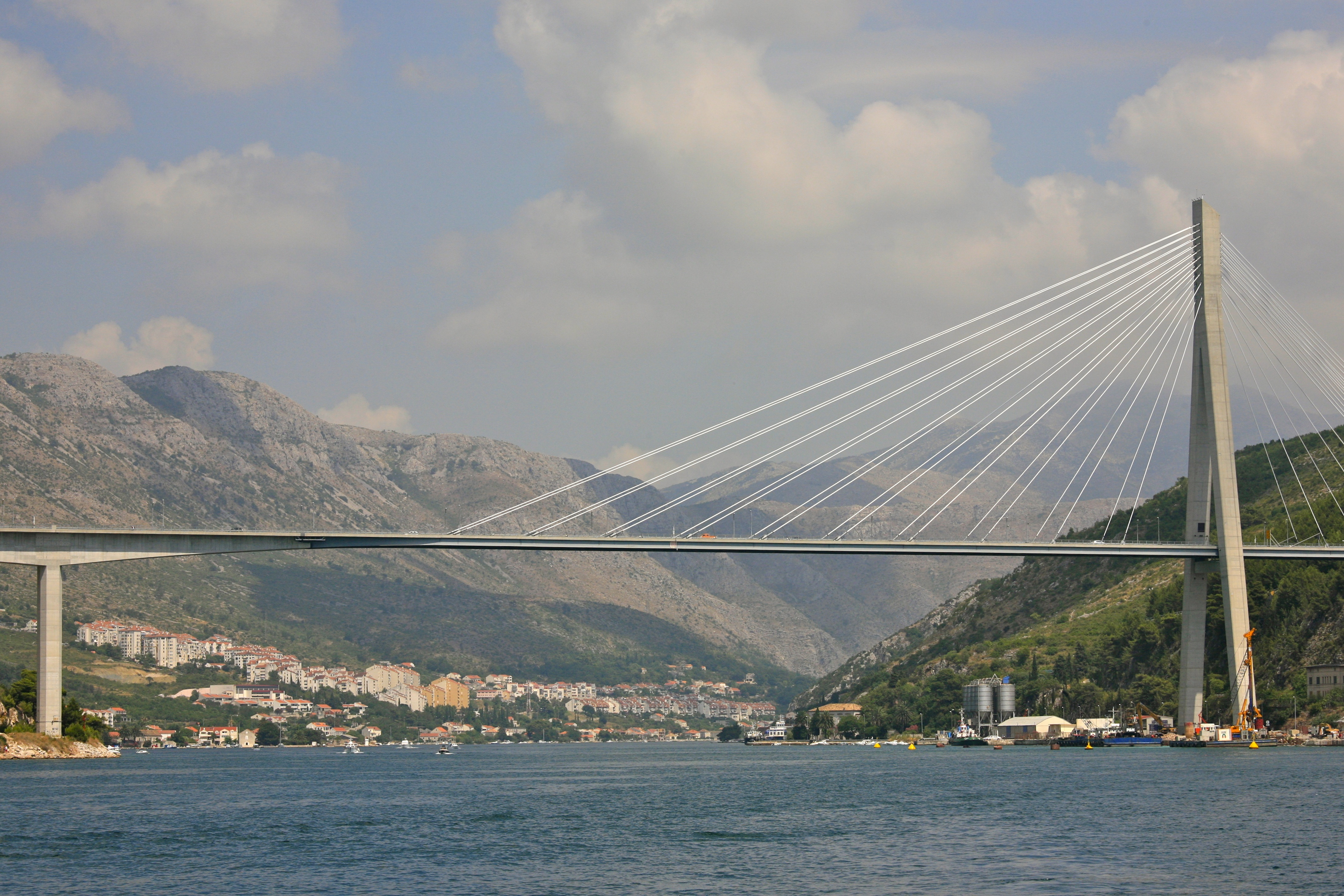
Franjo Tuđman Bridge in Dubrovnik

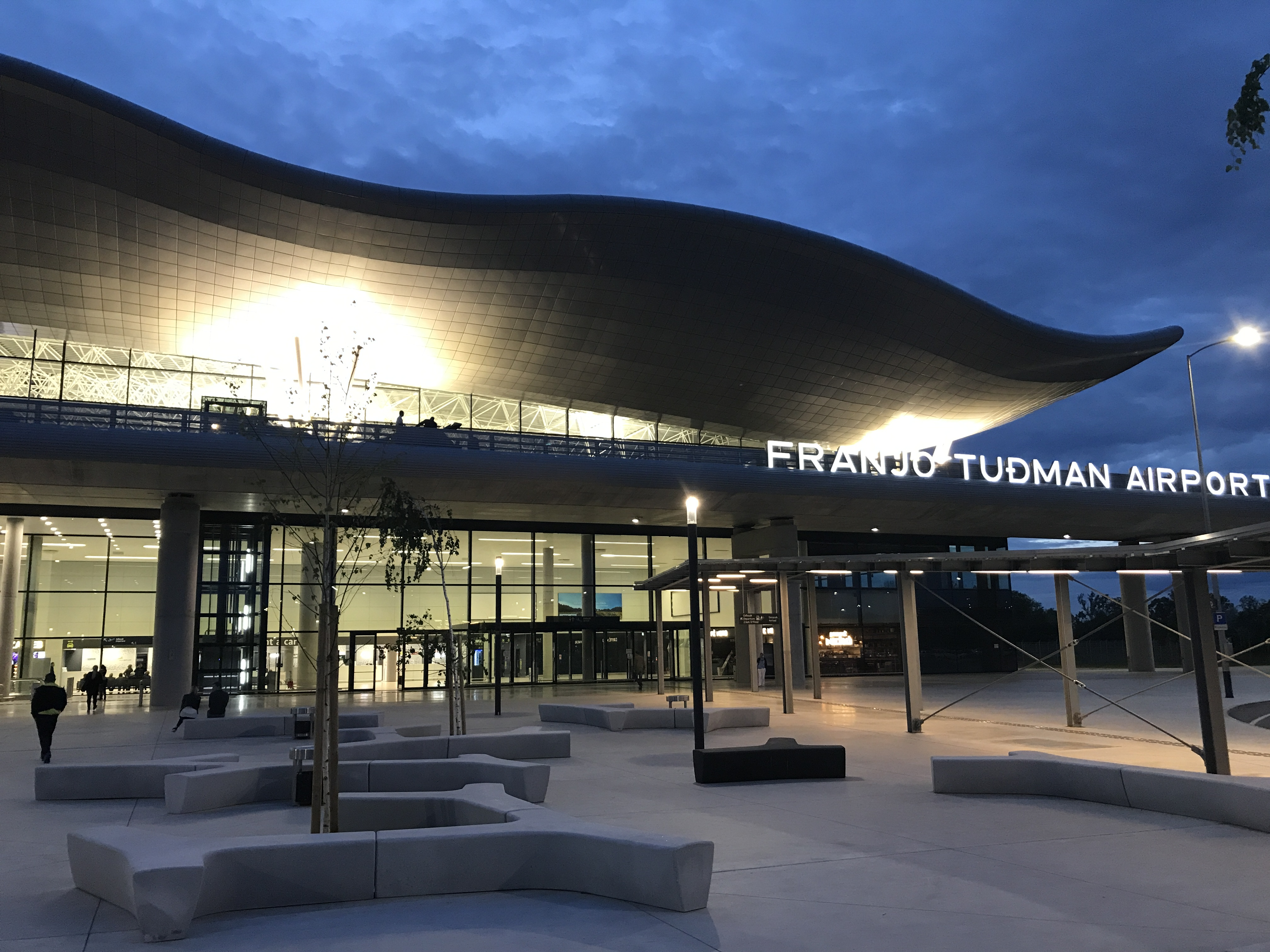
Franjo Tuđman Airport Zagreb

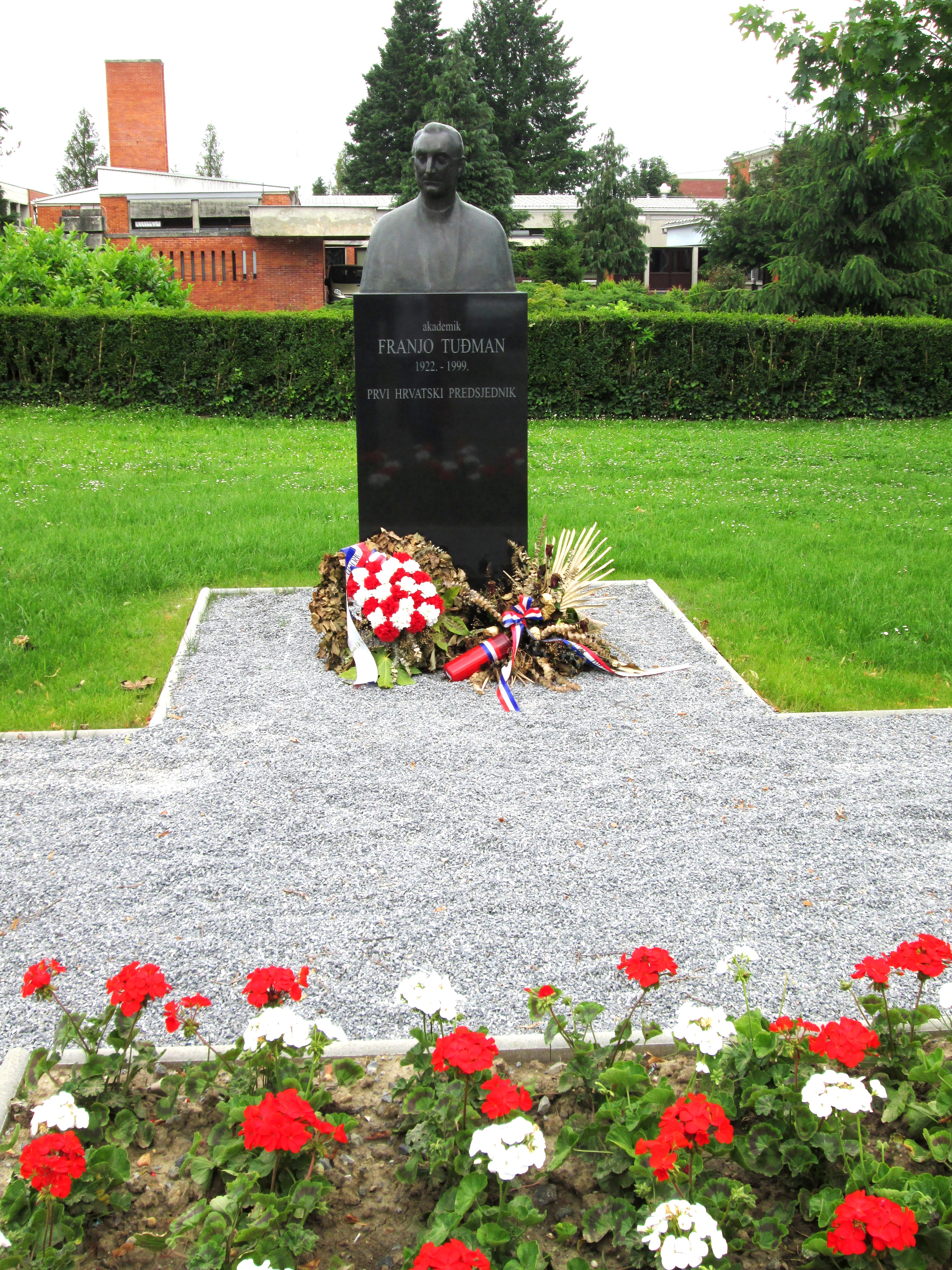
Monument in Bjelovar

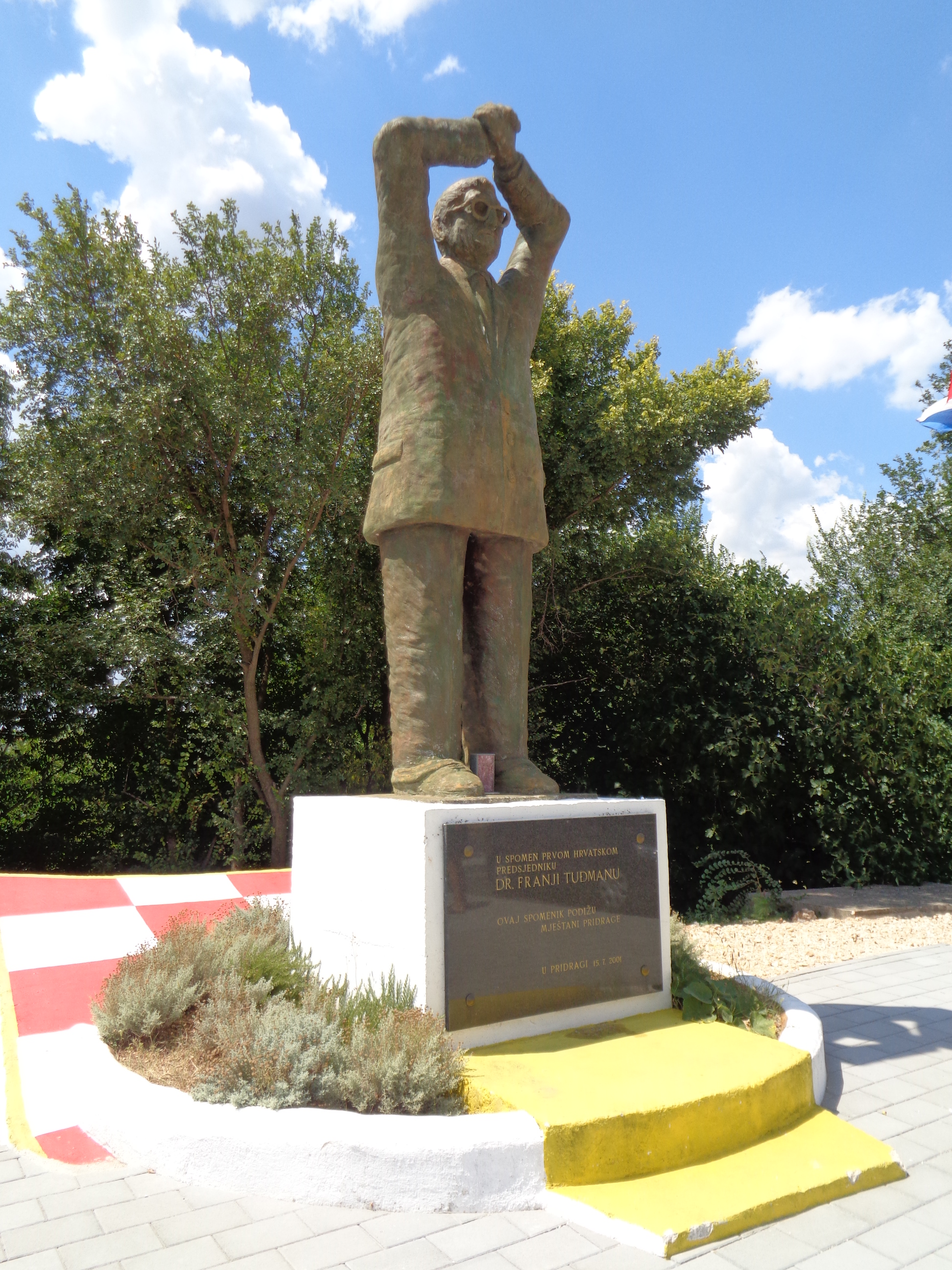
Statue in Pridraga

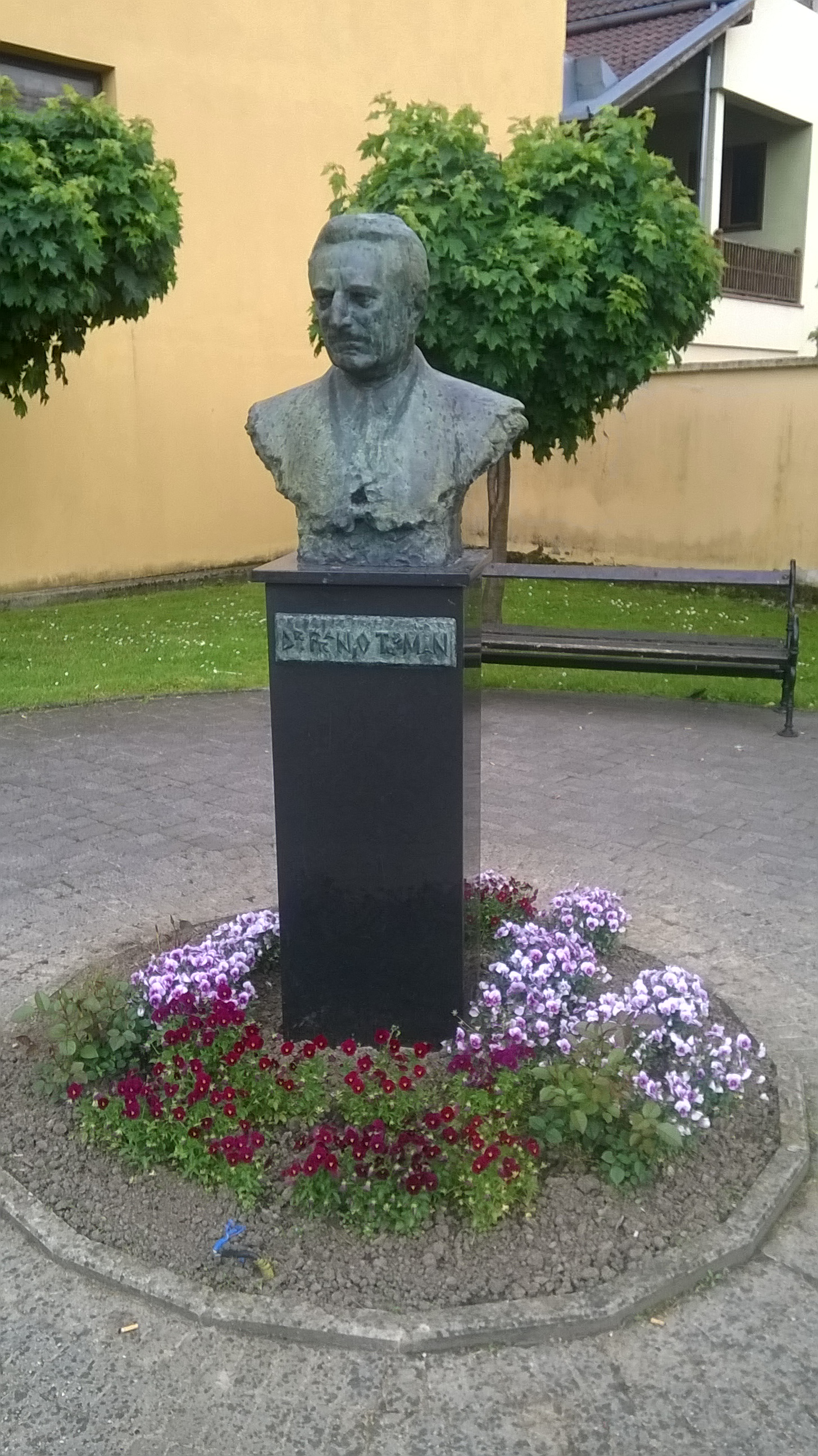
Monument in Pakrac

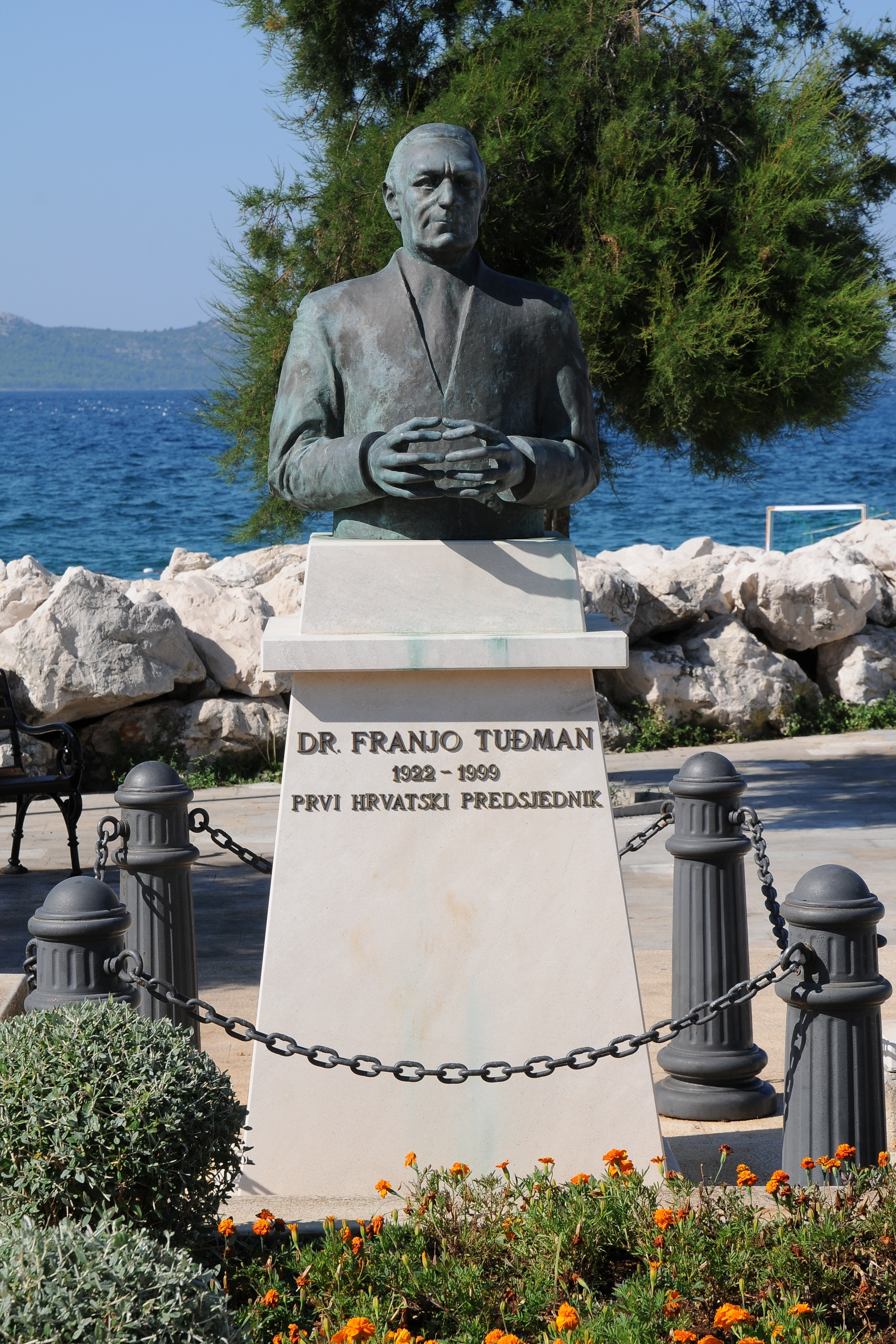
Monument in Diklo, Zadar

This is a partial list of places named in honor of Franjo Tuđman, the 1st President of the independent Republic of Croatia from 1990 until 1999:

== List ==
=== Airports ===
- Franjo Tuđman Airport, Zagreb

=== Bridges ===
- Franjo Tuđman Bridge, Čapljina
- Franjo Tuđman Bridge, Dubrovnik
- Franjo Tuđman Bridge, Osijek

=== Parks and green areas ===
- Bedekovčina
- Duga Resa
- Gračac
- Sisak
- Slunj
- Velika Gorica

=== Pathways ===
- Hrvatska Kostajnica
- Karlovac
- Makarska
- Novi Vinodolski
- Samobor
- Varaždin
- Župa dubrovačka

=== Institutions ===
- Croatian Defence Academy Dr. Franjo Tuđman, Zagreb
- University Campus Dr. Franjo Tuđman, Split
- Elementary school in Beli Manastir
- Elementary school in Brela
- Elementary school in Knin
- Elementary school in Korenica
- Elementary school in Lički Osik
- Elementary school in Šarengrad
- Memorial school in Veliko Trgovišće
- Croatian House Dr. Franjo Tuđman, Pakrac

=== Streets ===
- Beli Manastir
- Bibinje
- Biograd na moru
- Bizovac
- Čepin
- Gospić
- Grude
- Ilok
- Jasenovac
- Jastrebarsko
- Karlobag
- Kaštela
- Kistanje
- Knin
- Krapina
- Križevci
- Livno
- Lobor
- Lovinac
- Ludbreg
- Ljubuški
- Marina
- Međugorje
- Neum
- Pakrac
- Pirovac
- Podbablje
- Posedarje
- Požega
- Rogoznica
- Sibinj
- Solin
- Starigrad
- Sukošan
- Trogir
- Sveta Nedelja
- Valpovo
- Vir
- Vukovar
- Zabok
- Zadar
- Zadvarje
- Zagvozd
- Zmijavci

=== Squares ===
- Benkovac
- Bibinje
- Bjelovar
- Blato
- Čačinci
- Daruvar
- Drniš
- Đakovo
- Glina
- Gvozd
- Hrvatska Dubica
- Imotski
- Jasenovac
- Karlobag
- Koška
- Metković
- Našice
- Nerežišća
- Novalja
- Nova Bukovica
- Novigrad Podravski
- Novska
- Nuštar
- Obrovac
- Okučani
- Omiš
- Otočac
- Otok
- Ogulin
- Pakrac
- Petrinja
- Podstrana
- Sinj
- Skradin
- Slunj
- Split
- Sutivan
- Škabrnja
- Tomislavgrad
- Tovarnik
- Unešić
- Virovitica
- Vodice
- Vrbanja
- Vrgorac
- Vrlika
- Vrpolje
- Vukovar
- Zaprešić
- Zagreb

=== Waterfronts ===
- Jasenice
- Korčula
- Opuzen
- Orebić
- Ploče
- Senj
- Stari Grad
- Šibenik
- Tisno
- Sveti Filip i Jakov
- Umag
