= List of places and things named for John Marshall =

This is name of places and things named for Chief Justice John Marshall:

- John Marshall House in Richmond, Virginia
- John Marshall commemorative dollar
- Marshall, Missouri
- Marshall, Illinois
- Marshall, Liberia
- Marshall Township, Pennsylvania.
- Marshall County, Alabama
- Marshall County, Illinois
- Marshall County, Indiana
- Marshall County, Iowa
- Marshall County, Kentucky
- Marshall County, Mississippi
- Marshall County, Tennessee
- Marshall County, West Virginia
- The Marshall-Wythe School of Law at the College of William and Mary in Williamsburg, Virginia
- Franklin and Marshall College in Lancaster, Pennsylvania
- Marshall University in Huntington, West Virginia
- Marshall University Graduate College in South Charleston, West Virginia
- John Marshall Law School (Chicago) in Chicago, Illinois
- John Marshall Law School (Atlanta) in Atlanta, Georgia
- John Marshall Library, a branch of the Fairfax County Public Library
- John Marshall High School in Oklahoma City
- John Marshall High School (West Virginia) in Glen Dale, West Virginia, serving most of Marshall County, West Virginia
- John Marshall High School (Richmond, Virginia) (the original stood from 1909 until 1960, when the current school was completed)
- John Marshall High School (Los Angeles) in the Los Angeles Unified School District of Los Angeles, California
- John Marshall High School (Leon Valley, Texas) in Leon Valley, Texas (San Antonio address)
- John Marshall High School (Minnesota) in the Independent School District #535 of Rochester, Minnesota
- John Marshall High School (New York) in Rochester, New York
- John Marshall High School (Cleveland, Ohio) in Cleveland, Ohio
- John Marshall Metropolitan High School in Chicago, Illinois
- John Marshall High School in the Seattle School District of Seattle, Washington
- John Marshall High School in Bend, Oregon
- John Marshall High School (Wisconsin) in Milwaukee, Wisconsin
- John Marshall Elementary School in Philadelphia, Pa
- John Marshall Elementary School in Scranton, Pa
- John Marshall Elementary School in Edison, NJ
- John Marshall Elementary School in Elizabeth, NJ
- John Marshall Elementary School in Wausau, WI
- Marshall Traditional School in South Bend, IN
