= List of places named for Richard Montgomery =

This is a list of places named for Richard Montgomery, a major general of the Continental Army killed in the 1775 Battle of Quebec.

- Cities:
  - Montgomery, Alabama (The city was named for Richard Montgomery, but Montgomery County, Alabama, in which it is located, was named for Major Lemuel P. Montgomery.)
  - Montgomery, Massachusetts
  - Montgomery, Minnesota
  - Montgomery Twp, New Jersey
  - Montgomery, Vermont
  - Town of Montgomery, Orange County, NY
  - Village of Montgomery, Orange County, NY
  - Montgomery, Illinois (Note: This community was actually named in honor of Montgomery County, New York from which its original settlers emigrated. Montgomery County, New York was named after Richard Montgomery)
- Counties:
  - Montgomery County, Arkansas
  - Montgomery County, Georgia
  - Montgomery County, Illinois
  - Montgomery County, Indiana
  - Montgomery County, Iowa
  - Montgomery County, Kansas
  - Montgomery County, Kentucky
  - Montgomery County, Maryland
  - Montgomery County, Mississippi (there is some question as to whether this county was named for Richard Montgomery. There are two origins given in sources.)
  - Montgomery County, Missouri
  - Montgomery County, New York
  - Montgomery County, North Carolina
  - Montgomery County, Ohio
  - Montgomery County, Pennsylvania (there is some question as to whether this county was named for Richard Montgomery.)
  - Montgomery County, Virginia
- High Schools:
  - Richard Montgomery High School, Rockville, Maryland

There was also a ship, the SS Richard Montgomery, the wreck of which remains a potential hazard due to unexploded ordnance.
