= Lower Saxony =

State in Germany

Lower Saxony Niedersachsen (German) Neddersassen (Low German) Läichsaksen (Saterland Frisian)
- State
- Flag Coat of arms Brandmark

- Interactive map of Lower Saxony
- Coordinates: 52°45′22″N 9°23′35″E
- Country: Germany
- Capital: Hanover

Government
  - Body: Landtag of Lower Saxony
  - Minister-President: Olaf Lies (SPD)
  - Governing parties: SPD / Greens
  - Bundesrat votes: 6 (of 69)
  - Bundestag seats: 65 (of 630) (as of 2025)

Area
  - Total: 47,709.90 km^{2} (18,420.90 sq mi)

Population (31 December 2023)
  - Total: 8,161,981
  - Density: 171.0752/km^{2} (443.0828/sq mi)

GDP
  - Total: €399.397 billion (2025)
  - Per capita: €49,646 (2025)
- Time zone: UTC+1 (CET)
  - Summer (DST): UTC+2 (CEST)
- ISO 3166 code: DE-NI
- NUTS Region: DE9
- HDI (2022): 0.936 very high · 10th of 16
- Website: www.niedersachsen.de

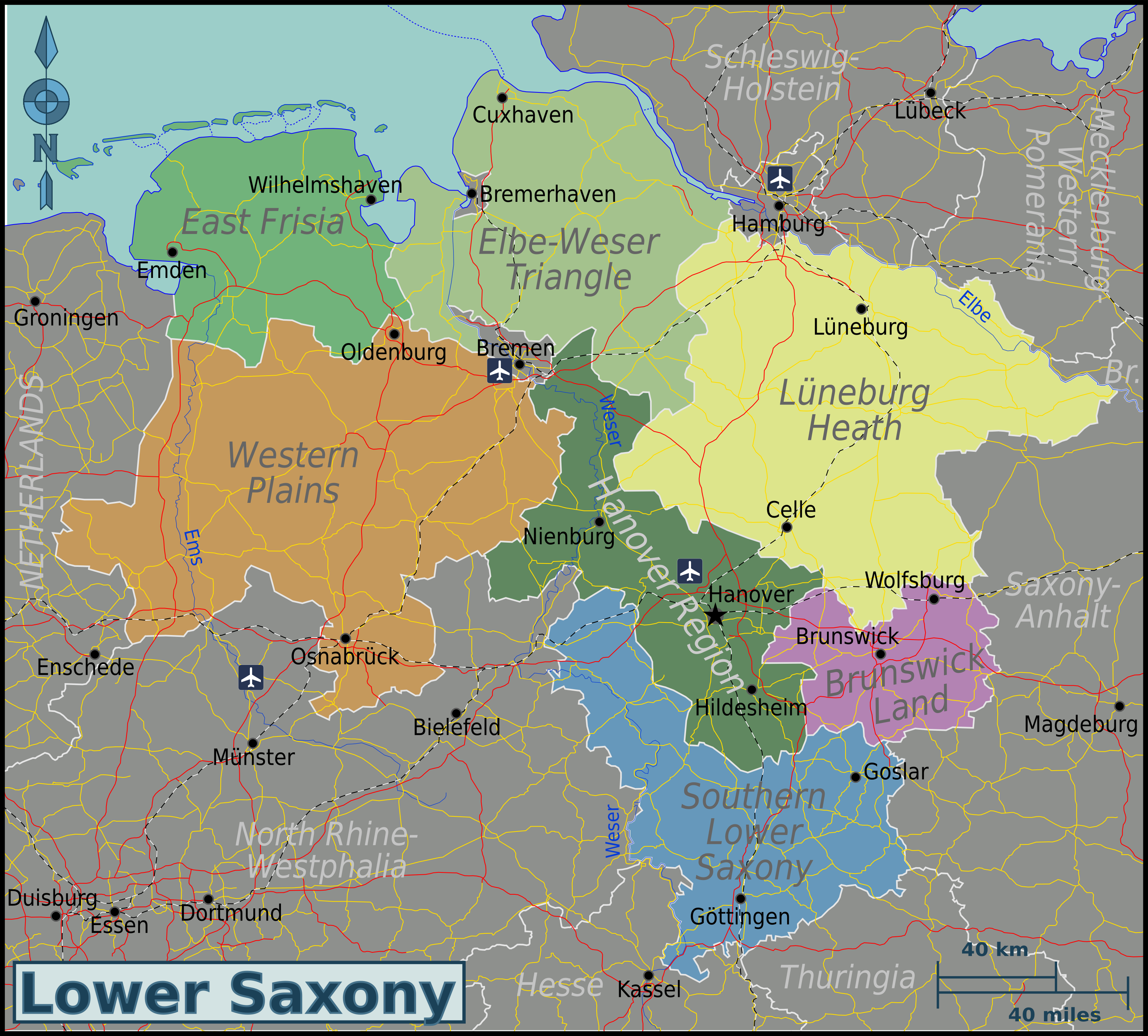
Map of Lower Saxony

Lower Saxony (Note: German: Niedersachsen [ˈniːdɐzaksn̩]; Low German: Neddersassen; Saterland Frisian: Läichsaksen) is a coastal state (Land) in northwestern Germany. It is the second-largest state by land area, with 47,614 km^{2} (18,384 sq mi), and fourth-largest in population (8 million in 2021) among the 16 Länder of the Federal Republic of Germany. In rural areas, Northern Low Saxon and Saterland Frisian are spoken to varying degrees.

Lower Saxony borders on (from north and clockwise) the North Sea, the states of Schleswig-Holstein, Hamburg, Mecklenburg-Vorpommern, Brandenburg, Saxony-Anhalt, Thuringia, Hesse and North Rhine-Westphalia, and the Netherlands. The state of Bremen forms two enclaves within Lower Saxony, one being the city of Bremen, the other its seaport, Bremerhaven (which is a semi-exclave, as it has a coastline). Lower Saxony thus borders more neighbours than any other single Bundesland. The state's largest cities are the state capital Hanover, Braunschweig (Brunswick), Oldenburg, Osnabrück, Wolfsburg, Göttingen, Salzgitter, Hildesheim, mainly situated in its central and southern parts, except Oldenburg.

Lower Saxony is the only Bundesland that encompasses both maritime and mountainous areas. The northwestern area of the state, on the coast of the North Sea, is called East Frisia and the seven East Frisian Islands offshore are popular with tourists. In the extreme west of Lower Saxony is the Emsland, an economically emerging but rather sparsely populated area, once dominated by inaccessible swamps. The northern half of Lower Saxony, also known as the North German Plain, is almost invariably flat except for the gentle hills around the Bremen geestland. Towards the south and southwest lie the northern parts of the Central Uplands: the Weser Uplands and the Harz Mountains. Between these two lie the Lower Saxon Hills, a range of low ridges.

The region in the northeast, the Lüneburg Heath (Lüneburger Heide), is the largest heathland area of Germany. In the Middle Ages, the town of Lüneburg was wealthy due to salt-mining and the salt trade. To the north the Elbe valley separates Lower Saxony from Hamburg, Schleswig-Holstein, Mecklenburg-Vorpommern, and Brandenburg. The left banks of the Elbe downstream Hamburg are known as the Altes Land (Old Country). Due to its gentle local climate and fertile soil, it is the state's largest area of fruit farming, its chief produce being apples.

The modern state of Lower Saxony was created from parts of the British occupation zone after World War II by the merger of the State of Hanover with the three smaller free states of Braunschweig, Oldenburg and Schaumburg-Lippe on 1 November 1946. As most of the new state's territory consisted of the historic Kingdom of Hanover, Lower Saxony adopted its coat of arms and other symbols.

== Geography ==
=== Location ===
Lower Saxony has a natural boundary in the north in the North Sea and the lower and middle reaches of the River Elbe, although parts of the city of Hamburg lie south of the Elbe. The state and city of Bremen is an enclave entirely surrounded by Lower Saxony. The Bremen/Oldenburg Metropolitan Region is a cooperative body for the enclave area. To the southeast, the state border runs through the Harz, low mountains that are part of the German Central Uplands. The northeast and west of the state, which form roughly three-quarters of its land area, belong to the North German Plain, while the south is in the Lower Saxon Hills, including the Weser Uplands, Leine Uplands, Schaumburg Land, Brunswick Land, Untereichsfeld, Elm, and Lappwald. In the northeast of Lower Saxony is the Lüneburg Heath. The heath is dominated by the poor, sandy soils of the geest, while in the central-east and southeast in the loess börde zone, productive soils with high natural fertility occur. Under these conditions—with loam and sand-containing soils—the land is well-developed agriculturally. In the west lie the County of Bentheim, Osnabrück Land, Emsland, Oldenburg Land, Ammerland, Oldenburg Münsterland, and on the coast East Frisia.

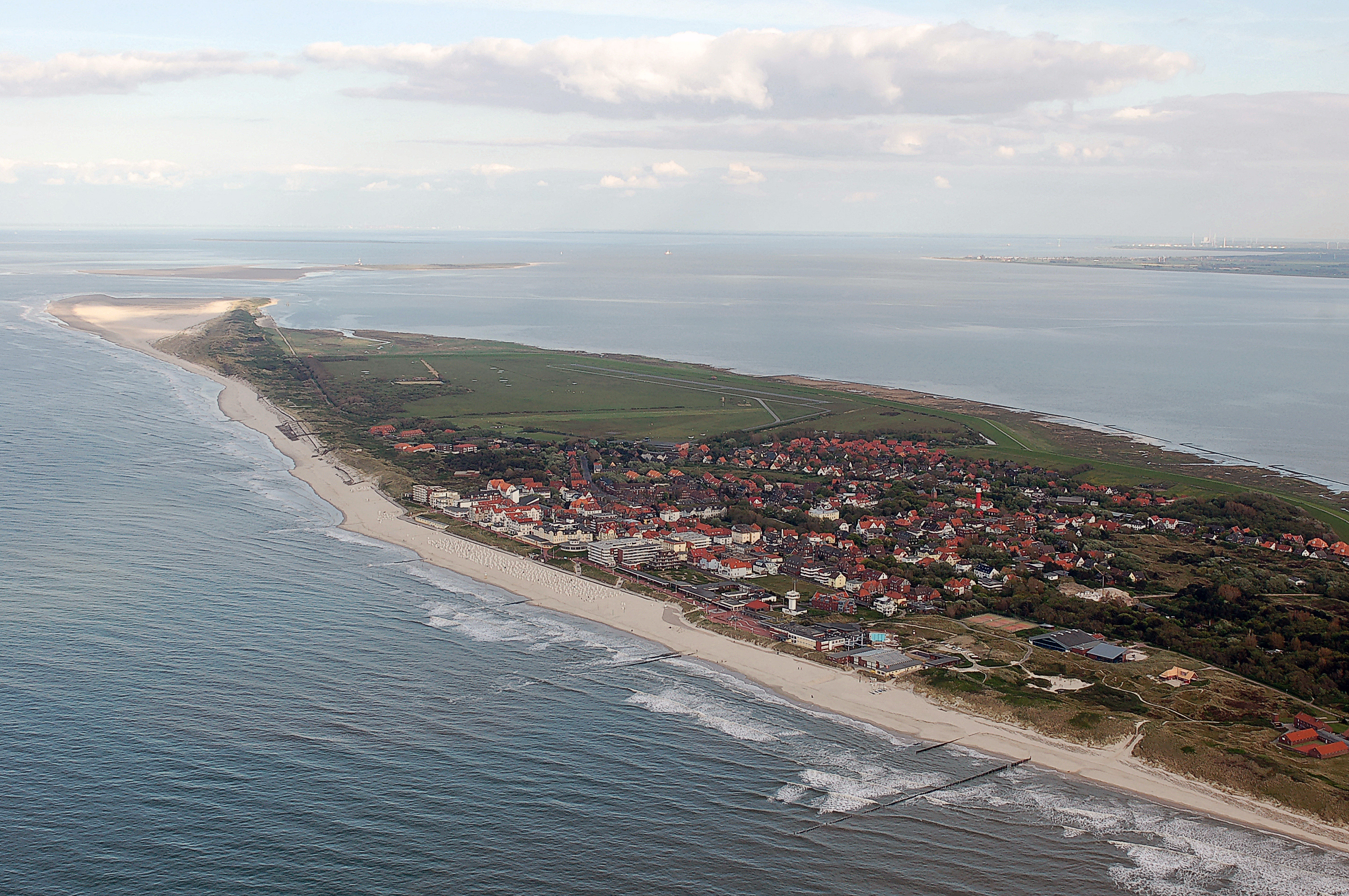
Wangerooge

The state is dominated by several large northwards-flowing rivers, including the Ems, Weser, Aller, and the Elbe.

The highest point in Lower Saxony is the Wurmberg (971 metres or 3,186 feet) in the Harz. Most of the significant hills and mountains are found in the southeastern part of the state. The lowest point in the state, at about 2.5 metres or 8 feet 2 inches below sea level, is a depression near Freepsum in East Frisia.

The state's economy, population, and infrastructure are centred on the cities and towns of Hanover, Stadthagen, Celle, Braunschweig, Wolfsburg, Hildesheim, and Salzgitter. Together with Göttingen in southern Lower Saxony, they form the core of the Hannover–Braunschweig–Göttingen–Wolfsburg Metropolitan Region.

=== Regions ===
==== General ====
Lower Saxony has clear regional divisions that manifest themselves geographically, as well as historically and culturally. In the regions that used to be independent, especially the heartlands of the former states of Brunswick, Hanover, Oldenburg and Schaumburg-Lippe, a marked local regional awareness exists. By contrast, the areas surrounding the Hanseatic cities of Bremen and Hamburg are much more oriented towards those centres.

==== List of regions ====
Sometimes, overlaps and transition areas happen between the various regions of Lower Saxony. Several of the regions listed here are part of other, larger regions, that are also included in the list.

- Altes Land
- Ammerland
- Artland
- County of Bentheim
- Bramgau
- Brunswick Land
- Calenberg Land
- Eastphalia
- East Frisia
- Eichsfeld
- Elbe-Weser Triangle
- Emsland
- Grönegau
- Land Hadeln
- Land Wursten
- Hannover
- Harz Mountains
- Hildesheim Börde
- Hümmling
- Innerste Uplands
- Kehdingen
- Leine Uplands
- Lüneburg Heath
- Middle Weser Region
- Oldenburg Land
- Oldenburg Münsterland
- Osnabrück Land
- Schaumburg Land
- Solling
- South Lower Saxony
- Stade Geest
- Wendland
- Weser Uplands
- Wesermarsch
- Wümme Depression

Just under 20% of the land area of Lower Saxony is designated as nature parks, i.e.: Dümmer, Elbhöhen-Wendland, Elm-Lappwald, Harz, Lüneburger Heide, Münden, Terra.vita, Solling-Vogler, Lake Steinhude, Südheide, Weser Uplands, Wildeshausen Geest, Bourtanger Moor-Bargerveen.

=== Climate ===
Lower Saxony falls climatically into the north temperate zone of central Europe that is affected by prevailing Westerlies and is located in a transition zone between the maritime climate of Western Europe and the continental climate of Eastern Europe. This transition is clearly noticeable within the state: while the northwest experiences an Atlantic (North Sea coastal) to Sub-Atlantic climate, with comparatively low variations in temperature during the course of the year and a surplus water budget, the climate towards the southeast is increasingly affected by the Continent. This is clearly shown by greater temperature variations between the summer and winter halves of the year and in lower and more variable amounts of precipitation across the year. This sub-continental effect is most sharply seen in the Wendland, in the Weser Uplands (Hamelin to Göttingen) and in the area of Helmstedt. The highest levels of precipitation are experienced in the Harz because the Lower Saxon part forms the windward side of this mountain range against which orographic rain falls. The average annual temperature is 8 °C (46 °F); 7.5 °C (45.5 °F) in the Altes Land and 8.5 °C (47.3 °F) in the district of Cloppenburg.

== Administration ==
Lower Saxony is divided into 37 districts (Landkreise or simply Kreise):

Map of Lower Saxony with the district boundaries

1. Ammerland
2. Aurich (includes Juist, Norderney and Baltrum)
3. County of Bentheim (Grafschaft Bentheim)
4. Celle
5. Cloppenburg
6. Cuxhaven
7. Diepholz
8. Emsland
9. Friesland (includes Wangerooge)
10. Gifhorn
11. Goslar
12. Göttingen (Note: Under the "Göttingen Law" of 1 January 1964, the town of Göttingen was incorporated into the rural district (Landkreis) of Göttingen, but is treated as an urban district unless other rules apply. On 1 November 2016 the districts of Osterode and Göttingen were merged under the name Göttingen, not influencing the city's special status.)
13. Hamelin-Pyrmont (Hameln-Pyrmont)
14. Hanover Region (Hannover) (Note: Under the "Law on the region of Hanover", Hanover merged with the district of Hanover to form the Hanover Region, which has been treated mostly as a rural district, but Hanover is treated as an urban district since 1 November 2001 unless other rules apply.)
15. Harburg
16. Heidekreis
17. Helmstedt
18. Hildesheim
19. Holzminden
20. Leer (includes Borkum)
21. Lüchow-Dannenberg
22. Lüneburg
23. Nienburg
24. Northeim
25. Oldenburg
26. Osnabrück
27. Osterholz
28. Peine
29. Rotenburg (Wümme)
30. Schaumburg
31. Stade
32. Uelzen
33. Vechta
34. Verden
35. Wesermarsch
36. Wittmund (includes Langeoog and Spiekeroog)
37. Wolfenbüttel

Furthermore, there are eight urban districts and two cities with special status:

1. Braunschweig
2. Delmenhorst
3. Emden
4. Göttingen
5. Hanover
6. Oldenburg
7. Osnabrück
8. Salzgitter
9. Wilhelmshaven
10. Wolfsburg

=== Historical subdivisions ===
Between 1946 and 2004, the state's districts and independent towns were grouped into eight regions, with a different status for two regions (Verwaltungsbezirke), comprising the formerly free states of Brunswick and Oldenburg. In 1978 these regions were merged into four governorates (Regierungsbezirke). In 2005 the Bezirksregierungen (regional governments) were again split into separate bodies.

1946–1978:

- Governorate of Aurich
- Administrative Region of Brunswick (Braunschweig)
- Governorate of Hanover (Hannover)
- Governorate of Hildesheim
- Governorate of Lunenburg (Lüneburg)
- Administrative Region of Oldenburg
- Administrative Region of Osnabrück
- Governorate of Stade

1978–2004:

- Governorate of Brunswick (Braunschweig)
- Governorate of Hanover (Hannover)
- Governorate of Lunenburg (Lüneburg)
- Governorate of Weser-Ems

On 1 January 2005 the four administrative regions or governorates (Regierungsbezirke), into which Lower Saxony had been hitherto divided, were dissolved. These were the governorates of Braunschweig, Hanover, Lüneburg and Weser-Ems.

=== Largest towns ===
The largest towns in Lower Saxony as of 31 December 2017:

Rank	City	Population
1	Hanover	535,061
2	Braunschweig	248,023
3	Oldenburg	167,081
4	Osnabrück	164,374
5	Wolfsburg	123,914
6	Göttingen	119,529
7	Salzgitter	104,548
8	Hildesheim	101,744
9	Delmenhorst	77,521
10	Wilhelmshaven	76,316
11	Lüneburg	75,192
12	Celle	69,706
13	Garbsen	60,875
14	Hamelin	57,228
15	Lingen (Ems)	54,117
16	Langenhagen	53,790
17	Nordhorn	53,278
18	Wolfenbüttel	52,357
19	Goslar	51,128
20	Emden	50,607

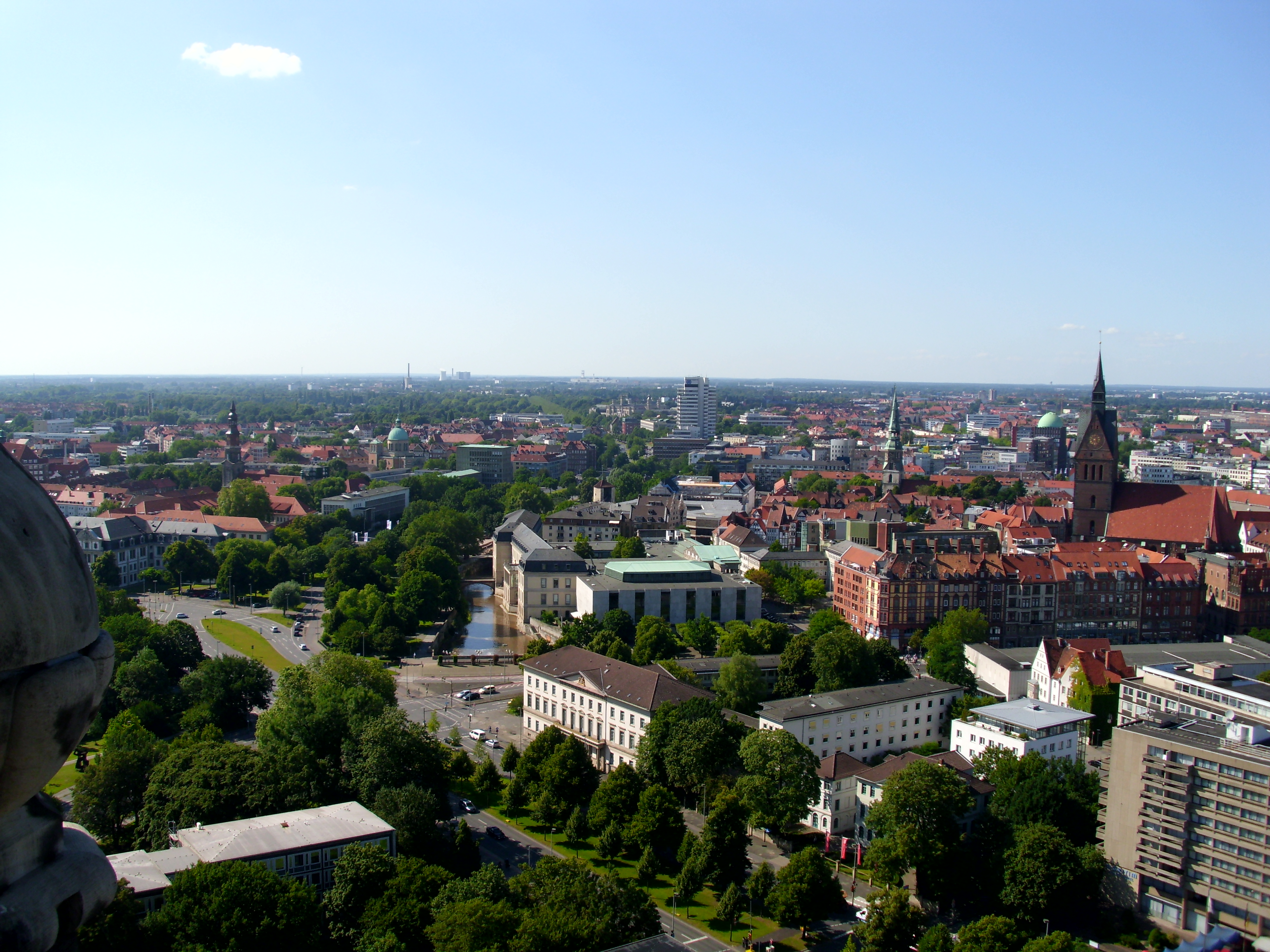
Hanover - capital and largest city of Lower Saxony

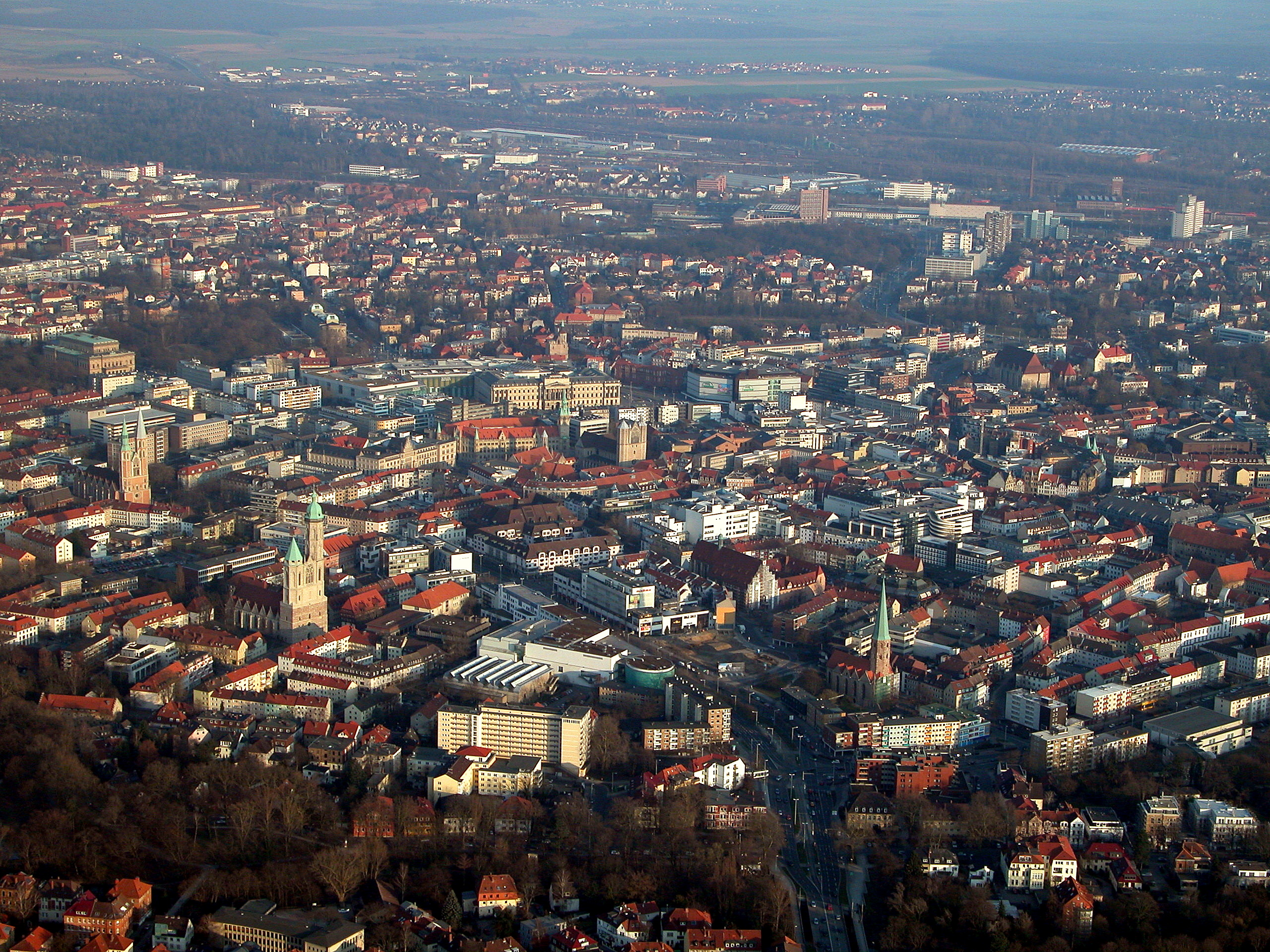
City center of Braunschweig

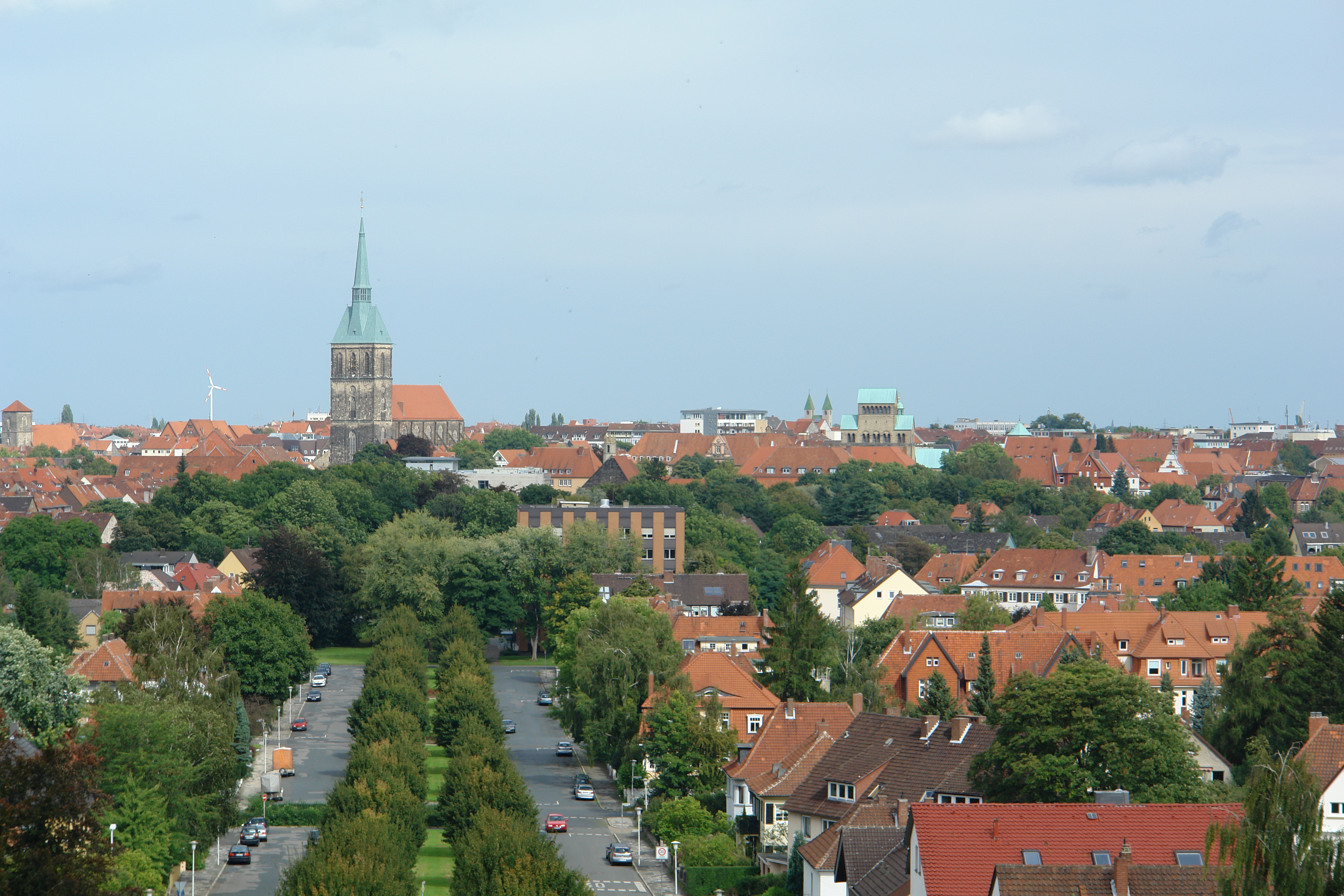
City center of Hildesheim with St. Andrew's, the tallest church in Lower Saxony, and Hildesheim Cathedral, a UNESCO World Heritage Site

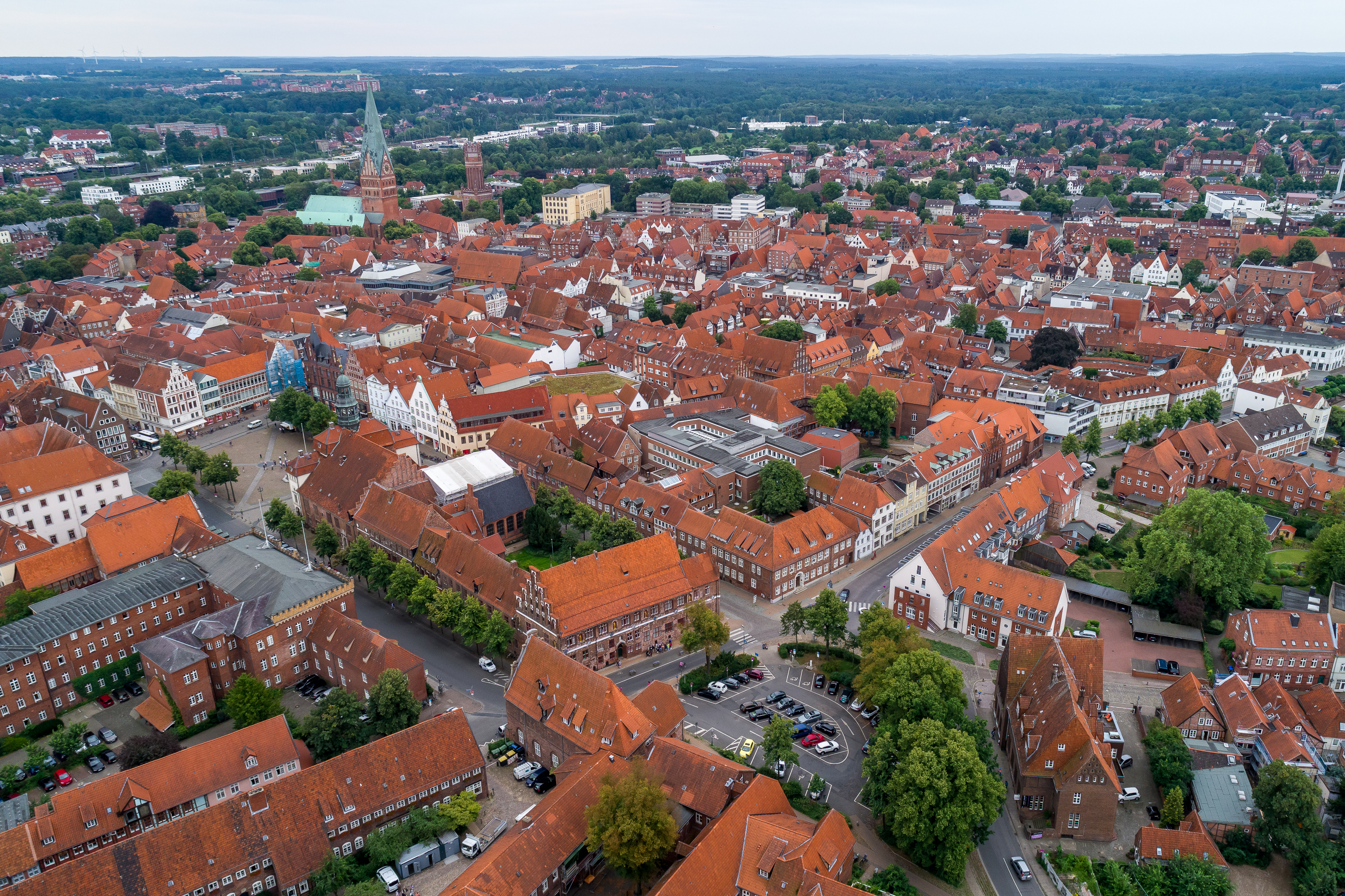
Old town of the Hanseatic City of Lüneburg

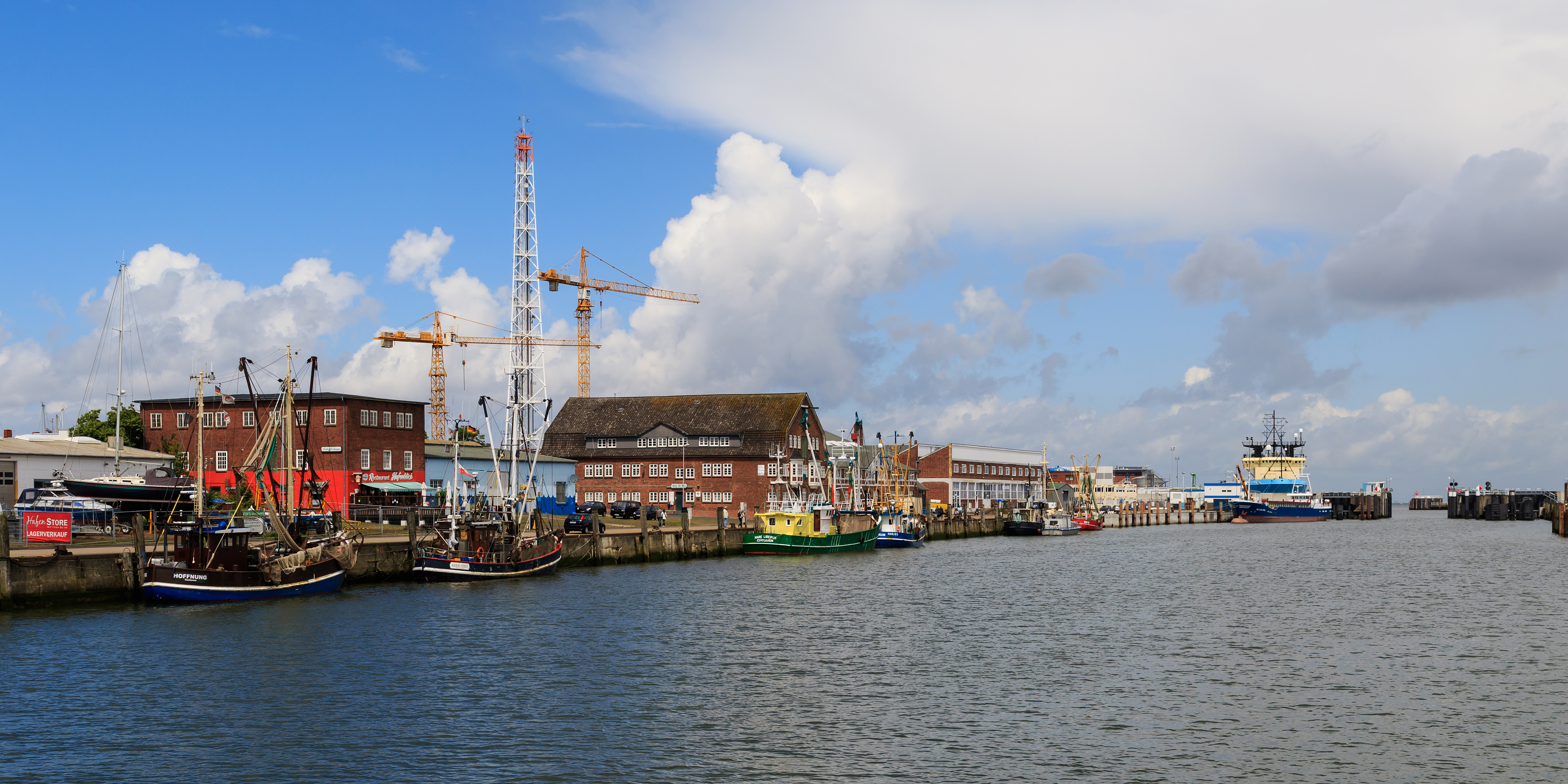
Cuxhaven port

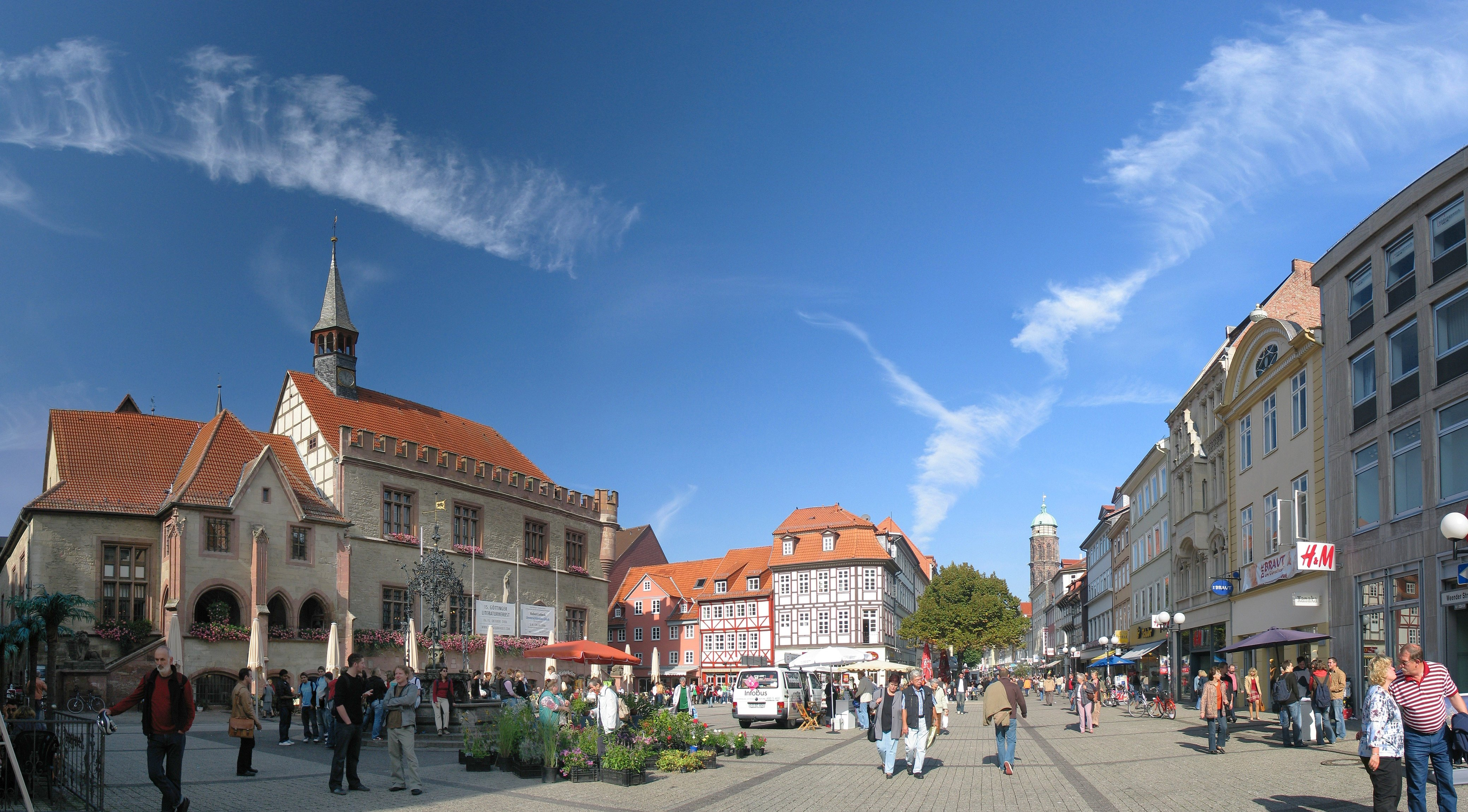
Göttingen market square and the old town hall

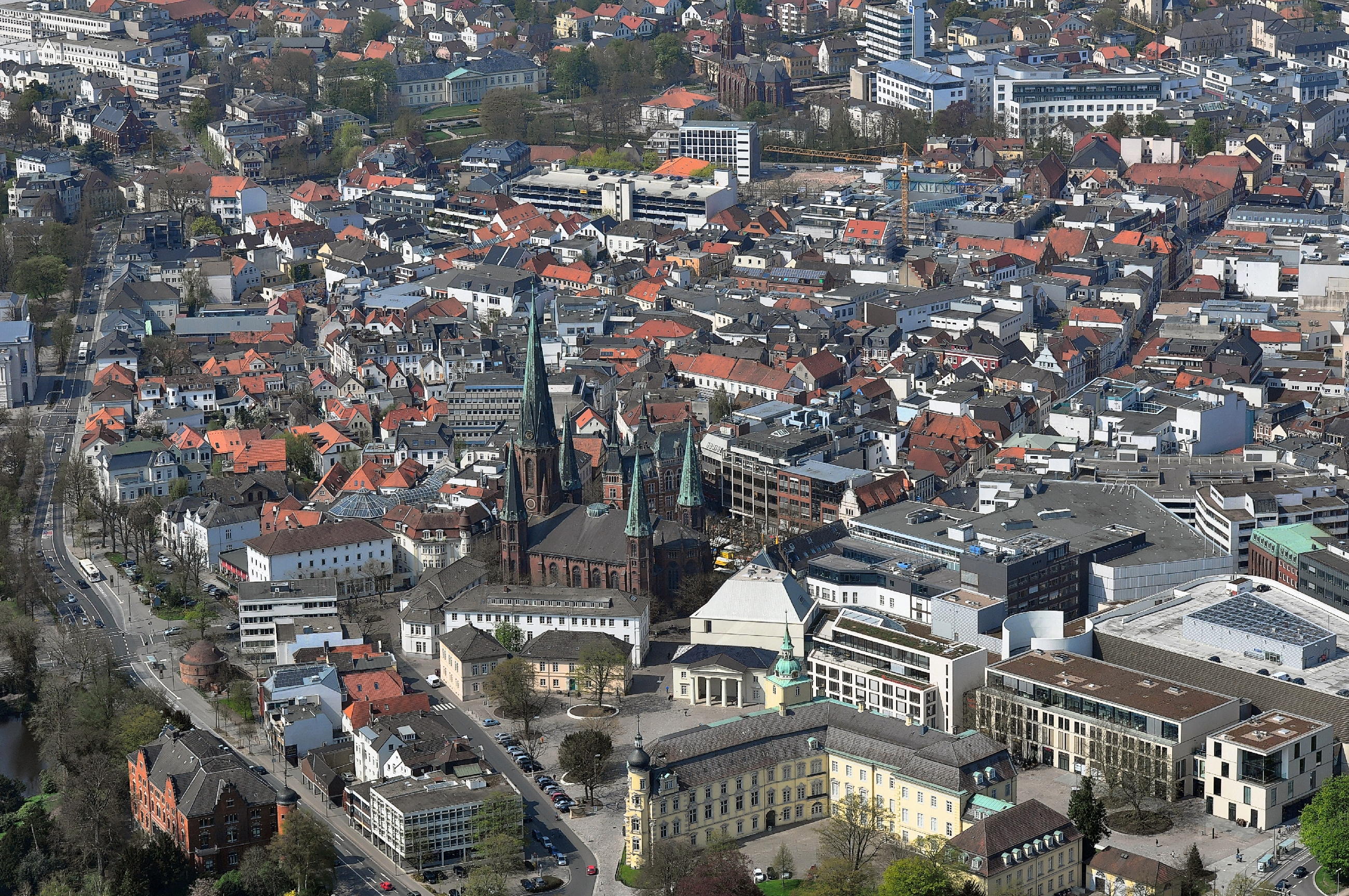
City center of Oldenburg

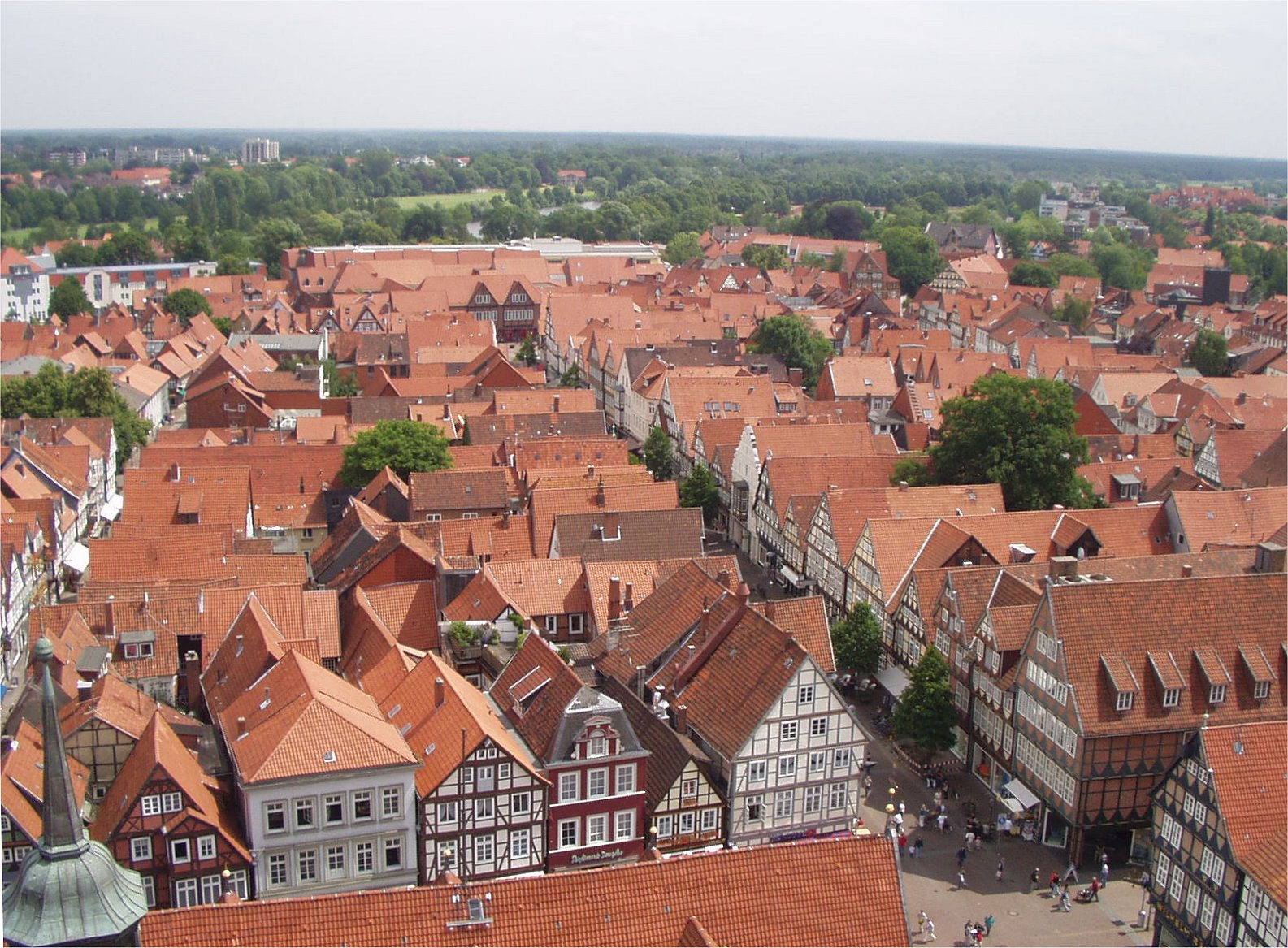
Old town of Celle

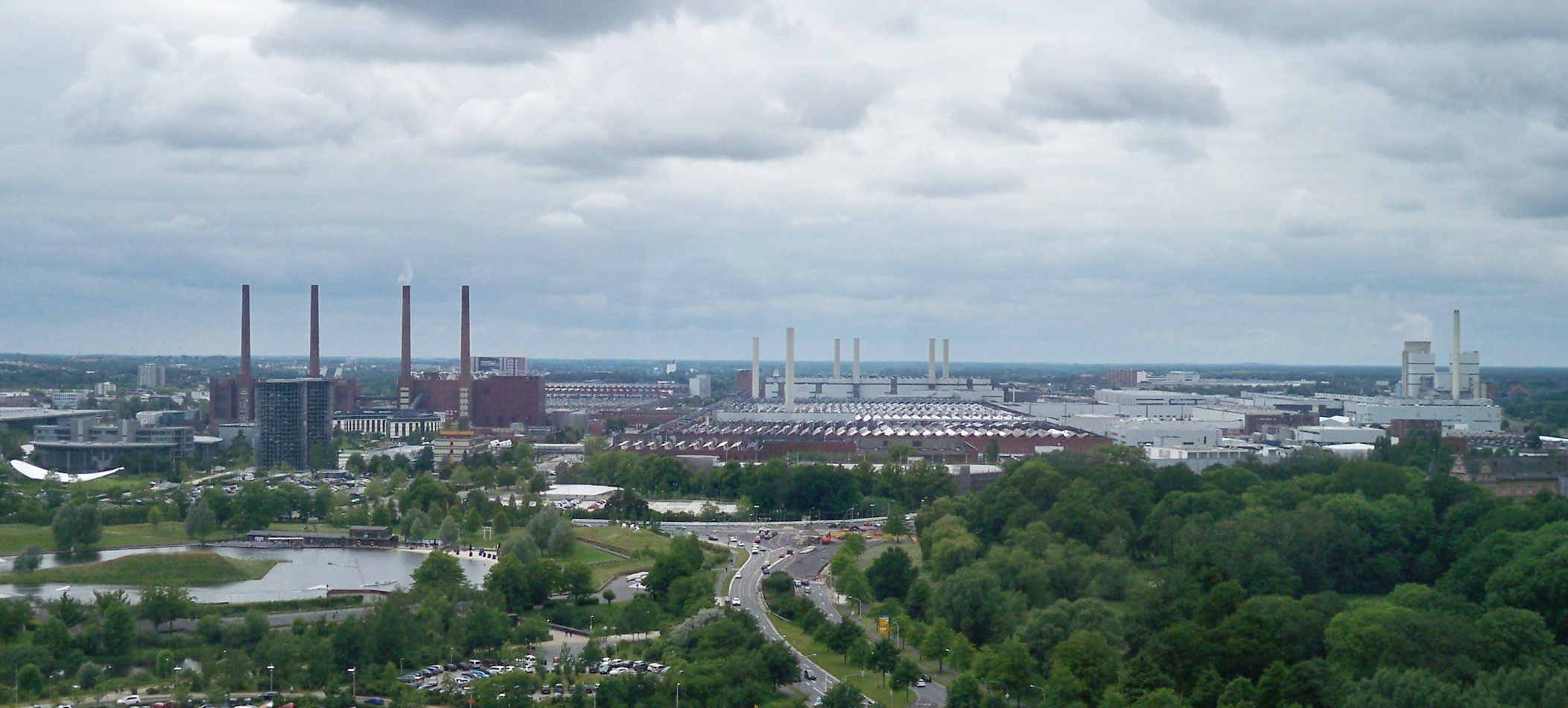
Volkswagen headquarters and factory in Wolfsburg

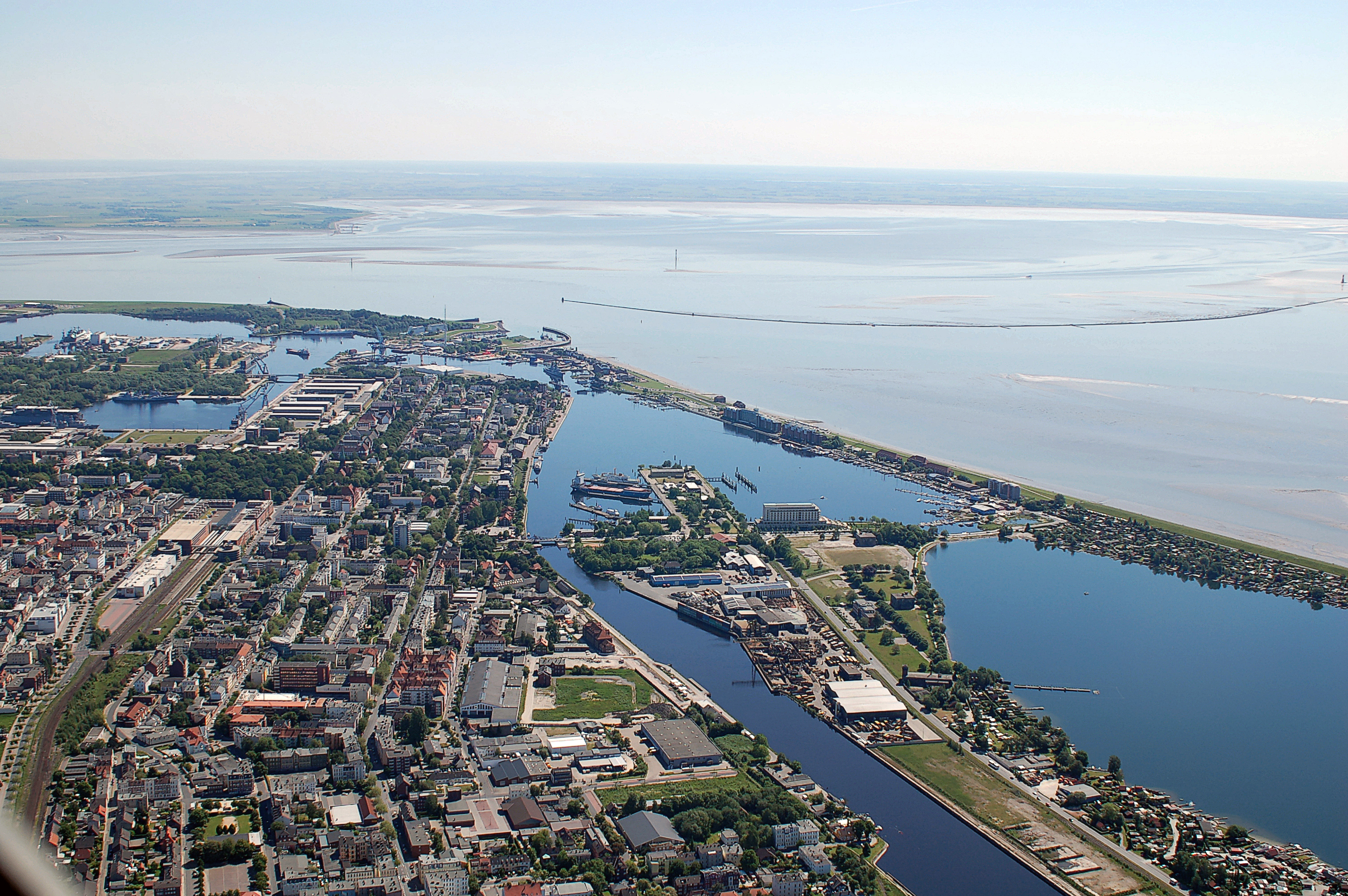
Wilhelmshaven with the North Sea

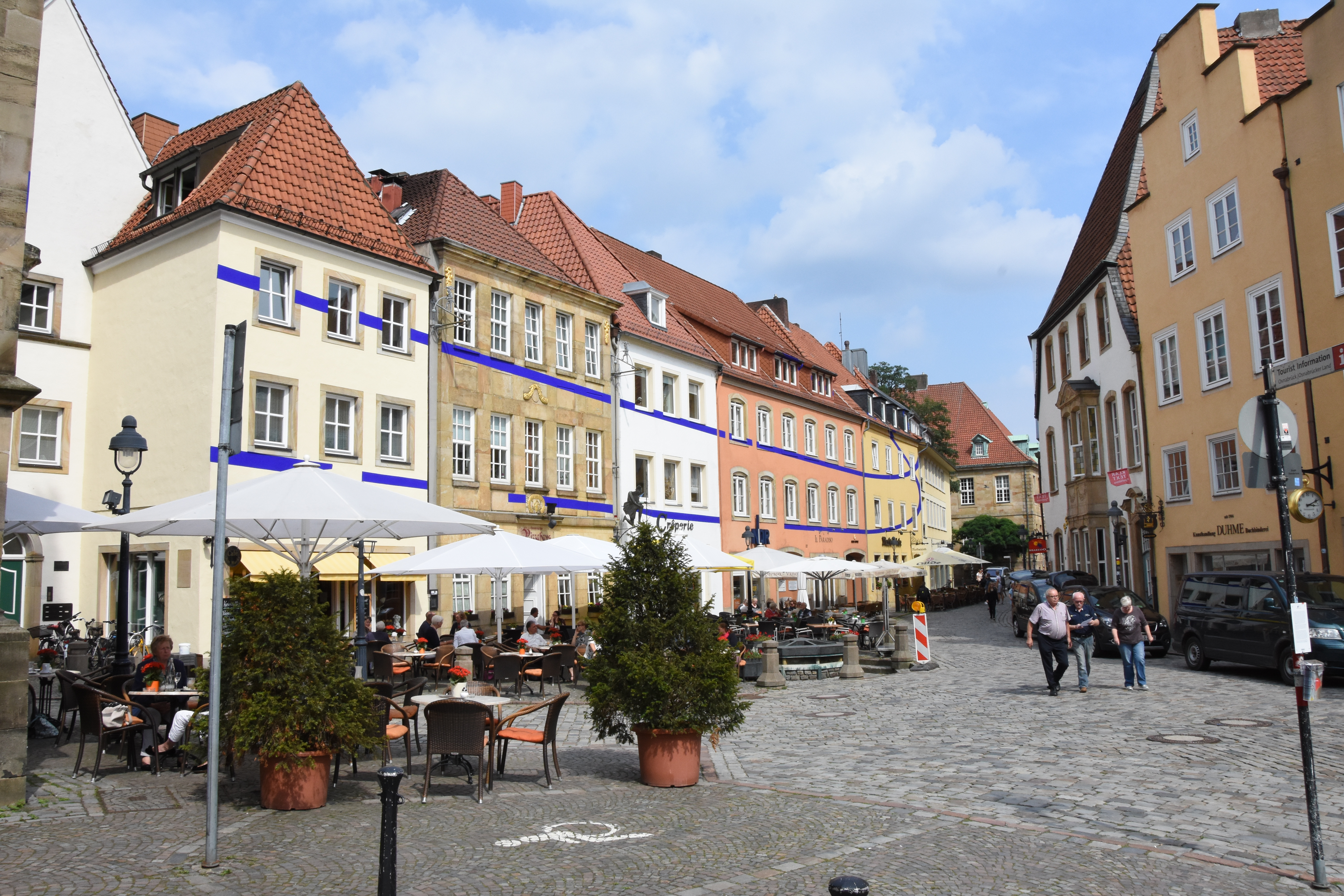
Old town of Osnabrück

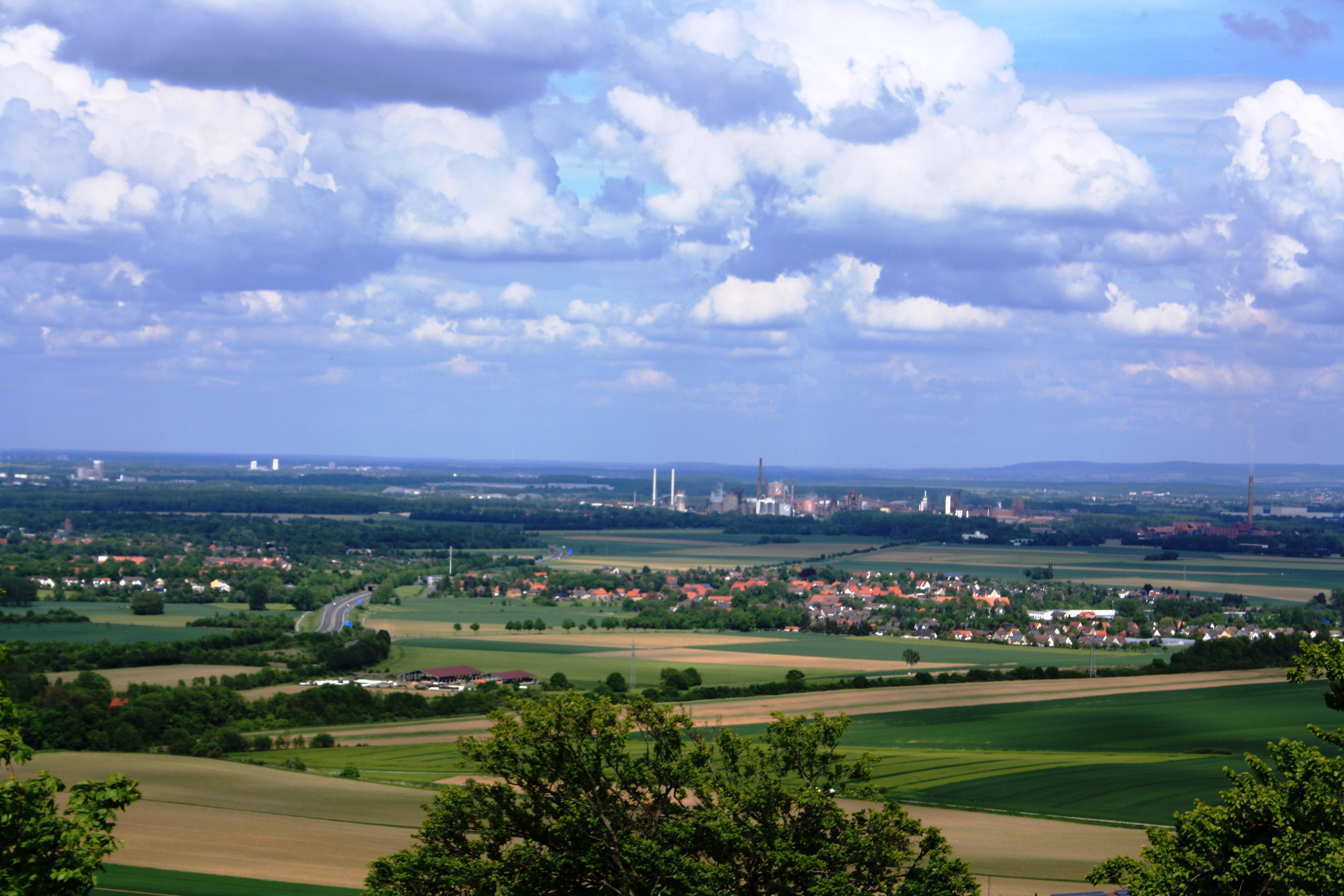
Salzgitter with the Salzgitter AG steel plant

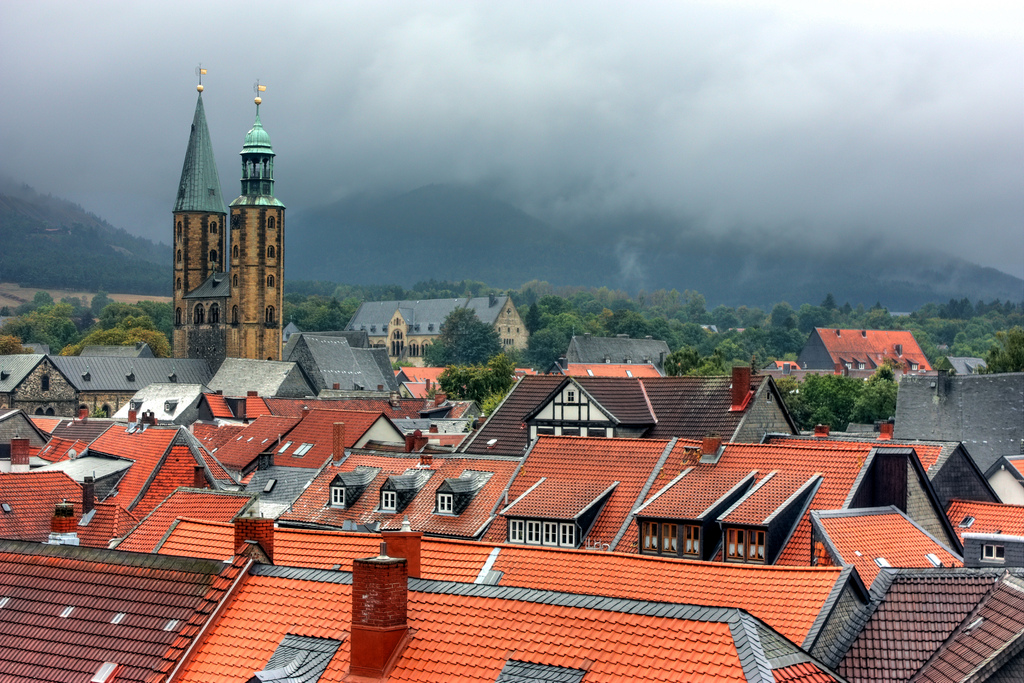
View of the old town of Goslar and the Imperial Palace, both UNESCO World Heritage Sites

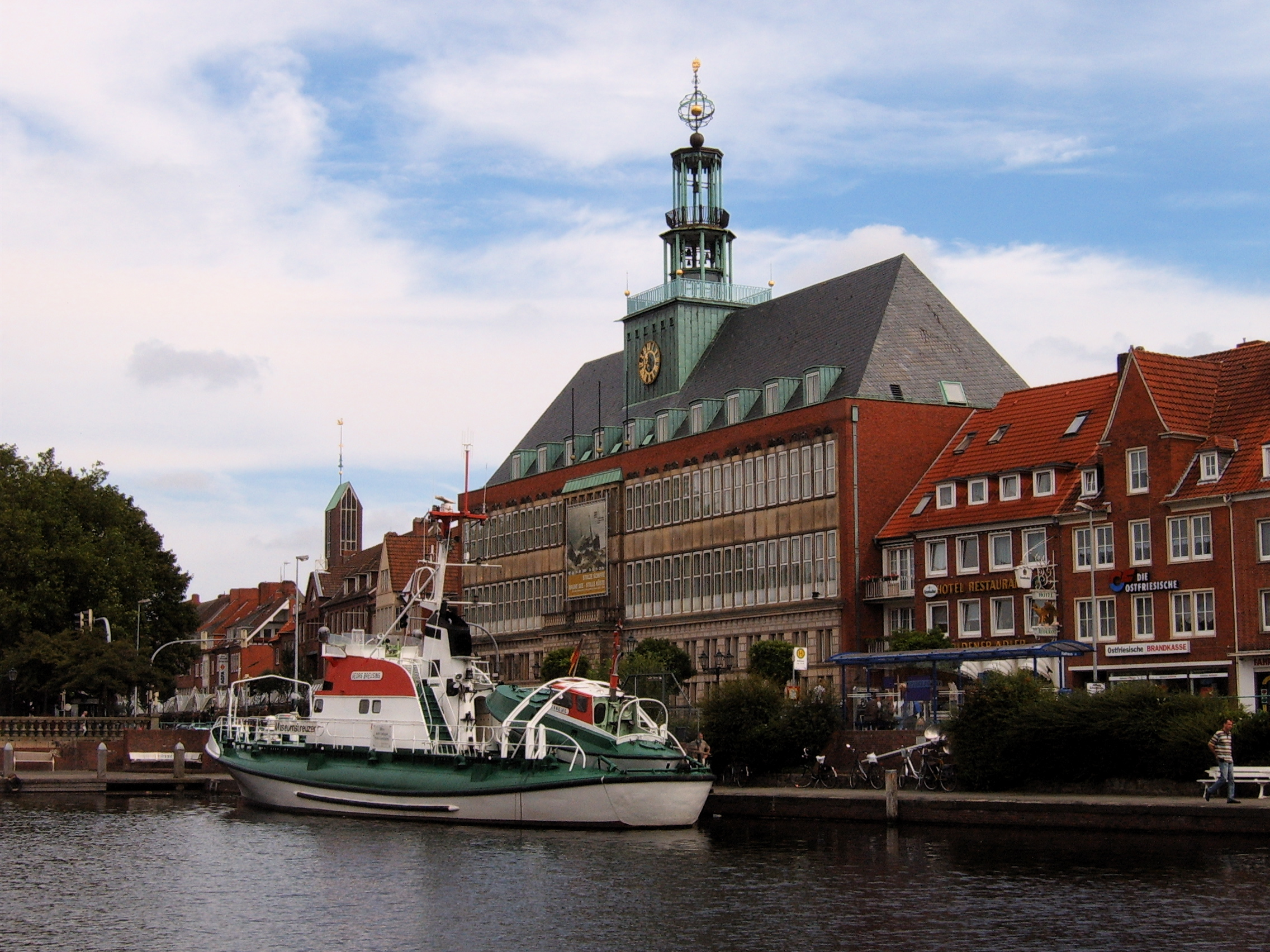
Town hall of Emden

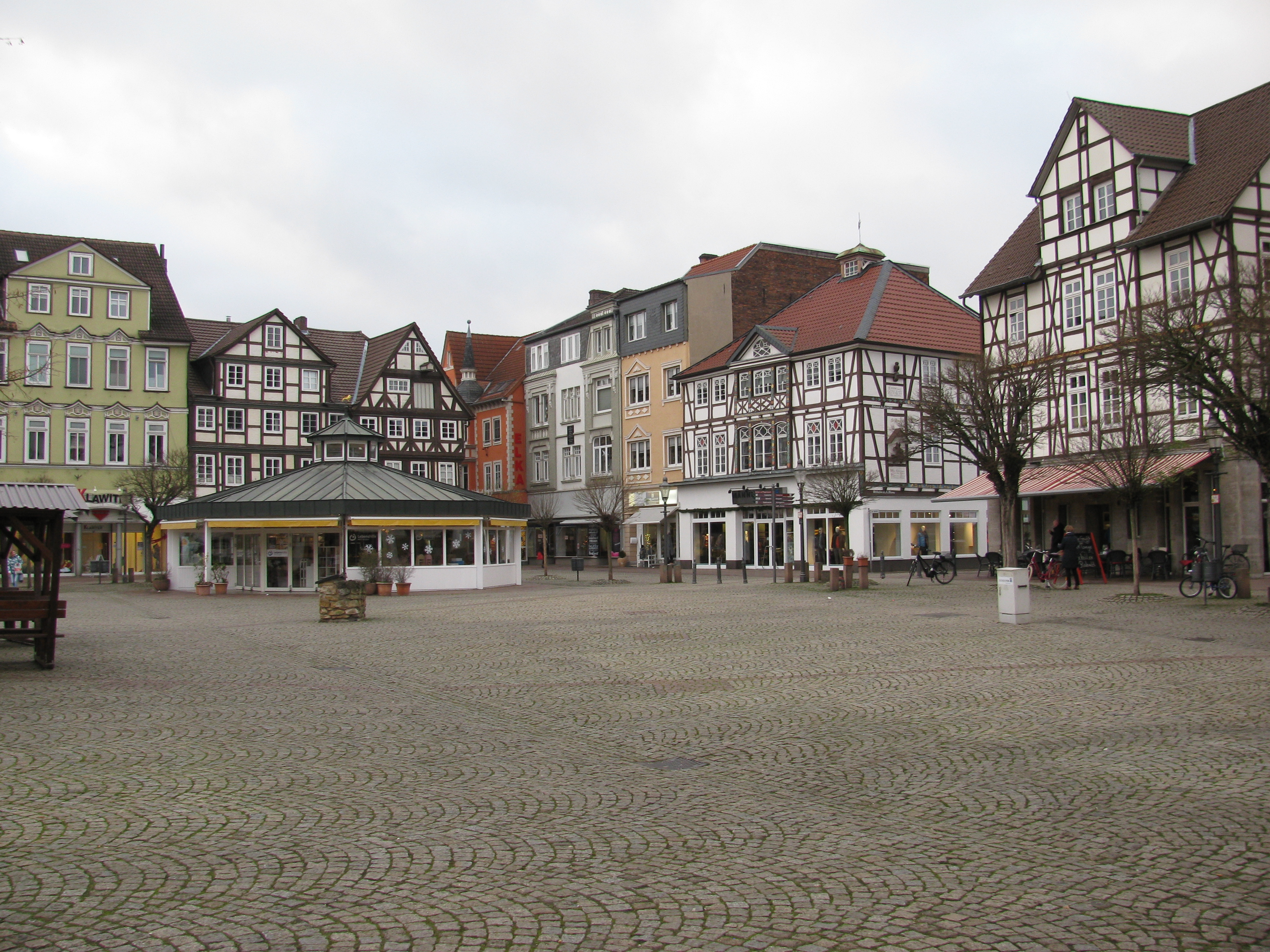
Market square of Peine

== History ==
=== Regional history prior to foundation of Lower Saxony ===
The name of Saxony derives from that of the Germanic confederation of tribes called the Saxons. Before the late medieval period, there was a single Duchy of Saxony. The term "Lower Saxony" was used after the dissolution of the stem duchy in the late 13th century to distinguish the parts of the former duchy ruled by the House of Welf from the Electorate of Saxony on one hand, and from the Duchy of Westphalia on the other.

==== Medieval and early modern period ====
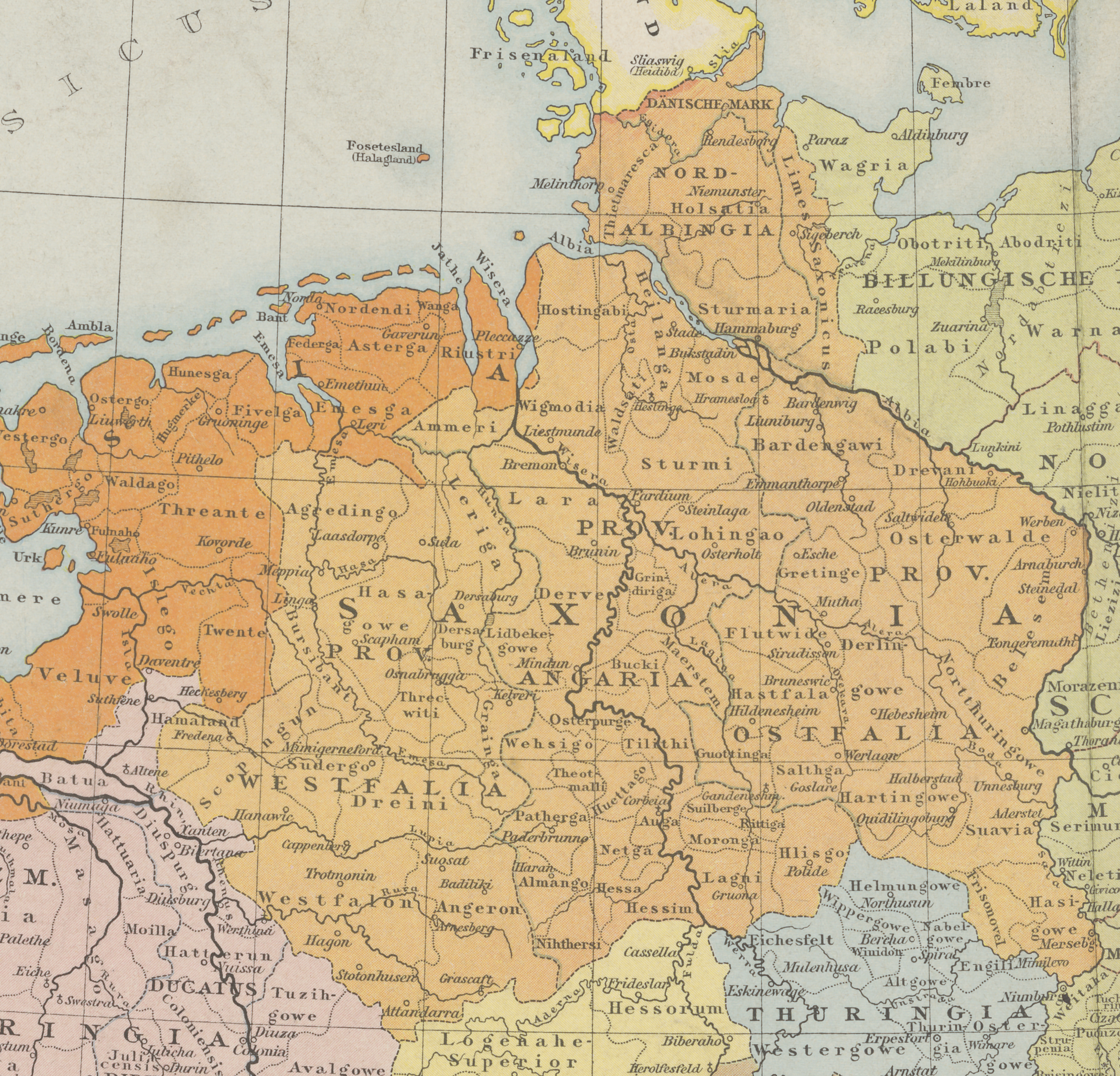
The Duchy of Saxony around 1000

The name and coat of arms of the present state go back to the Germanic tribe of Saxons. During the Migration Period some of the Saxon peoples left their homeland in Holstein about the 3rd century and pushed southwards over the Elbe, where they expanded into the sparsely populated regions in the rest of the lowlands, in present-day Northwest Germany and the northeastern part of what is now the Netherlands. From about the 7th century the Saxons had occupied a settlement area that roughly corresponds to the present state of Lower Saxony, of Westphalia and a number of areas to the east, for example, in what is now west and north Saxony-Anhalt. The land of the Saxons was divided into about 60 Gaue. The Frisians had not moved into this region; for centuries they preserved their independence in the most northwesterly region of the present-day Lower Saxon territory. The original language of the folk in the area of Old Saxony was West Low German, one of the varieties of language in the Low German dialect group.

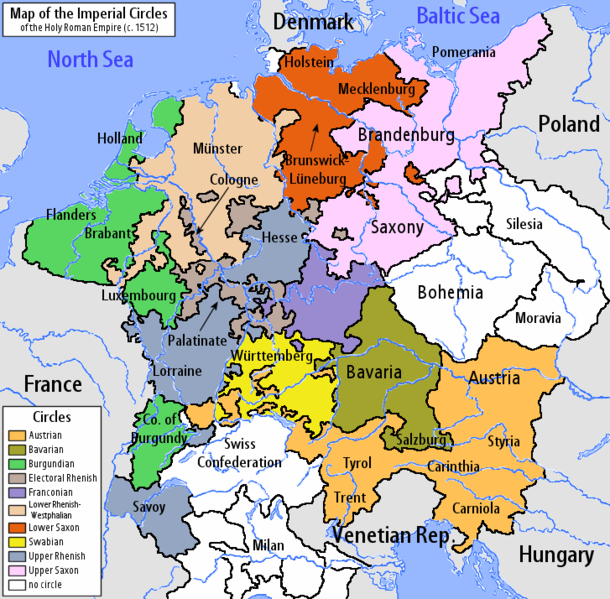
Imperial circles at the start of the 16th century. Red: the Lower Saxon Circle, light brown: the Lower Rhenish-Westphalian Circle

The establishment of permanent boundaries between what later became Lower Saxony and Westphalia began in the 12th century. In 1260, in a treaty between the Archbishopric of Cologne and the Duchy of Brunswick-Lüneburg the lands claimed by the two territories were separated from each other. The border ran along the Weser to a point north of Nienburg. The northern part of the Weser-Ems region was placed under the rule of Brunswick-Lüneburg.

The word Niedersachsen was first used before 1300 in a Dutch rhyming chronicle (Reimchronik). From the 14th century it referred to the Duchy of Saxe-Lauenburg (as opposed to Saxe-Wittenberg). On the creation of the imperial circles in 1500, a Lower Saxon Circle was distinguished from a Lower Rhenish–Westphalian Circle. The latter included the following territories that, in whole or in part, belong today to the state of Lower Saxony: the Bishopric of Osnabrück, the Bishopric of Münster, the County of Bentheim, the County of Hoya, the Principality of East Frisia, the Principality of Verden, the County of Diepholz, the County of Oldenburg, the County of Schaumburg and the County of Spiegelberg. At the same time a distinction was made with the eastern part of the old Saxon lands from the central German principalities later called Upper Saxony for dynastic reasons.

The close historical links between the domains of the Lower Saxon Circle now in modern Lower Saxony survived for centuries especially from a dynastic point of view. The majority of historic territories whose land now lies within Lower Saxony were sub-principalities of the medieval, Welf estates of the Duchy of Brunswick-Lüneburg. All the Welf princes called themselves dukes "of Brunswick and Lüneburg" despite often ruling parts of a duchy that was forever being divided and reunited as various Welf lines multiplied or died out.

==== Congress of Vienna to Second World War (1815–1945) ====
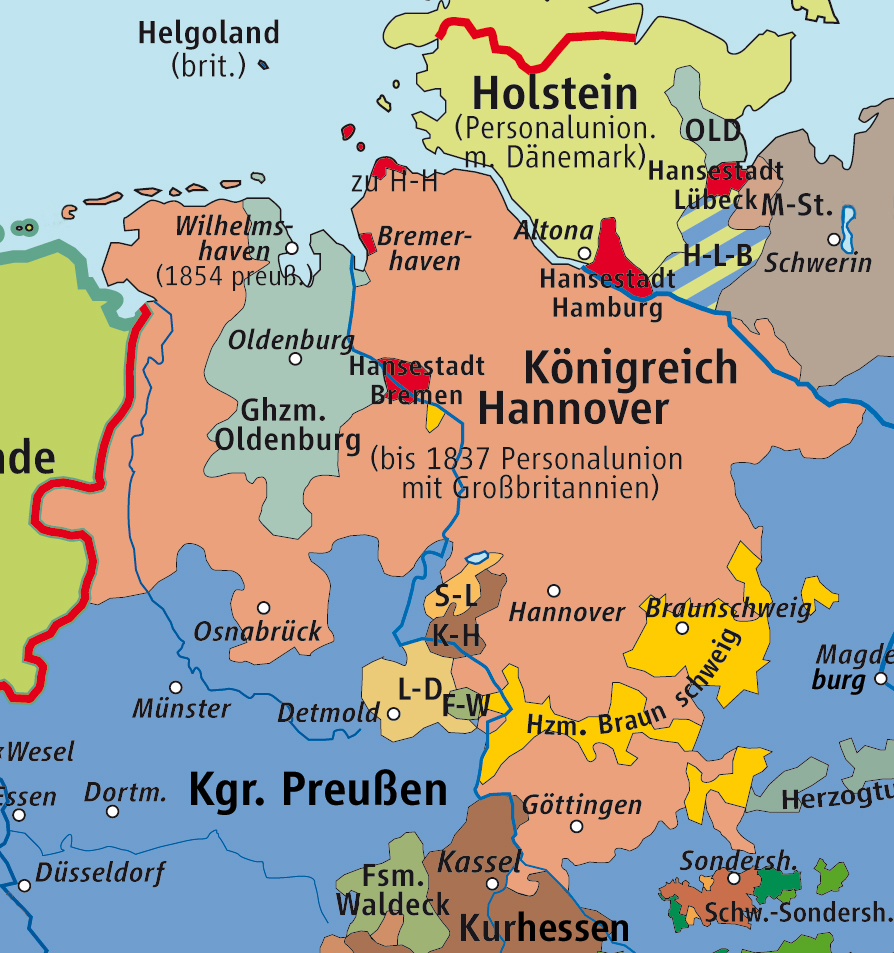
The Kingdom of Hanover, the Duchy of Brunswick, the Grand Duchy of Oldenburg and the Principality of Schaumburg-Lippe in the 19th century

Two major principalities survived east of the Weser after the Napoleonic Wars: the Kingdom of Hanover and the Duchy of Brunswick (after 1866 Hanover became a Prussian province; after 1919 Brunswick became a free state). Historically a close tie existed between the royal house of Hanover (Electorate of Hanover) and the United Kingdom of Great Britain and Ireland as a result of their personal union in the 18th century (the personal union was dissolved when Victoria became the Queen of the United Kingdom in 1837 because Hanover did not allow female rulers).

West of the River Hunte a "de-Westphalianising process" began in 1815. After the Congress of Vienna the territories of the later administrative regions (Regierungsbezirke) of Osnabrück and Aurich transferred to the Kingdom of Hanover. The Grand Duchy of Oldenburg and the Principality of Schaumburg-Lippe retained state autonomy. Nevertheless, the entire Weser-Ems region (including the city of Bremen) were grouped in 1920 into a Lower Saxon Constituency Association (Wahlkreisverband IX (Niedersachsen)). This indicates that at that time the western administrations of the Prussian Province of Hanover and the state of Oldenburg were perceived as being "Lower Saxon".

The forerunners of today's state of Lower Saxony were lands that were geographically and, to some extent, institutionally interrelated from very early on. The County of Schaumburg (not to be confused with the Principality of Schaumburg-Lippe) around the towns of Rinteln and Hessisch Oldendorf did indeed belong to the Prussian province of Hesse-Nassau until 1932, a province that also included large parts of the present state of Hesse, including the cities of Kassel, Wiesbaden and Frankfurt am Main; but in 1932 the County of Schaumburg became part of the Prussian Province of Hanover.

When the Nazi Party seized power in 1933, they quickly transformed Germany into a highly centralised state and divided the entire Third Reich into Gaue which largely superseded (but did not outright replace) Germany's traditional federal system. Nevertheless, some changes to the old state and provincial borders were made in 1937, notably including the city of Cuxhaven being fully integrated into the Prussian Province of Hanover under the Greater Hamburg Act. The effect of this Nazi-era change was that in 1946, after the Third Reich had collapsed and when state of Lower Saxony was founded, only four states needed to be merged. With the exception of Bremen and the areas that were ceded to the Soviet Occupation Zone in 1945, all those areas allocated to the new state of Lower Saxony in 1946, had already been merged into the "Constituency Association of Lower Saxony" in 1920.

In a lecture on 14 September 2007, Dietmar von Reeken described the emergence of a "Lower Saxony consciousness" in the 19th century, the geographical basis of which was used to invent a territorial construct: the resulting local heritage societies (Heimatvereine) and their associated magazines routinely used the terms "Lower Saxony" or "Lower Saxon" in their names. At the end of the 1920s in the context of discussions about a reform of the Reich, and promoted by the expanding local heritage movement (Heimatbewegung), a 25-year conflict started between "Lower Saxony" and "Westphalia". The supporters of this dispute were administrative officials and politicians, but regionally focussed scientists of various disciplines were supposed to have fuelled the arguments. In the 1930s, a real Lower Saxony did not yet exist, but there were a plethora of institutions that would have called themselves "Lower Saxon". The motives and arguments in the disputes between "Lower Saxony" and "Westphalia" were very similar on both sides: economic interests, political aims, cultural interests and historical aspects.

==== Formation of the state (1945–1946) ====
After the Second World War most of Northwest Germany lay within the British Zone of Occupation. On 23 August 1946, the British Military Government issued Ordinance No. 46 "Concerning the dissolution of the provinces of the former state of Prussia in the British Zone and their reconstitution as independent states", which initially established the State of Hanover on the territory of the former Prussian Province of Hanover. Its minister president, Hinrich Wilhelm Kopf, had already suggested in June 1945 the formation of a state of Lower Saxony, that was to include the largest possible region in the middle of the British Zone. In addition to the regions that actually became Lower Saxony subsequently, Kopf asked, in a memorandum dated April 1946, for the inclusion of the former Prussian district of Minden-Ravensberg (i.e. the Westphalian city of Bielefeld as well as the Westphalian districts of Minden, Lübbecke, Bielefeld, Herford and Halle), the district of Tecklenburg and the state of Lippe. Kopf's plan was ultimately based on a draft for the reform of the German Empire from the late 1920s by Georg Schnath and Kurt Brüning. The strong Welf connotations of this draft, according to Thomas Vogtherr, did not simplify the development of a Lower Saxon identity after 1946.

An alternative model, proposed by politicians in Oldenburg and Brunswick, envisaged the foundation of the independent state of "Weser-Ems", that would be formed from the state of Oldenburg, the Hanseatic City of Bremen and the administrative regions of Aurich and Osnabrück. Several representatives of the state of Oldenburg even demanded the inclusion of the Hanoverian districts of Diepholz, Syke, Osterholz-Scharmbeck and Wesermünde in the proposed state of "Weser-Ems". Likewise an enlarged State of Brunswick was proposed in the southeast to include the Regierungsbezirk of Hildesheim and the district of Gifhorn. Had this plan come to fruition, the territory of the present Lower Saxony would have consisted of three states of roughly equal size.

The district council of Vechta protested on 12 June 1946 against being incorporated into the metropolitan area of Hanover (Großraum Hannover). If the State of Oldenburg was to be dissolved, Vechta District would much rather be included in the Westphalian region. Particularly in the districts where there was a political Catholicism the notion was widespread, that Oldenburg Münsterland and the Regierungsbezirk of Osnabrück should be part of a newly formed State of Westphalia.

Since the foundation of the states of North Rhine-Westphalia and Hanover on 23 August 1946 the northern and eastern border of North Rhine-Westphalia has largely been identical with that of the Prussian Province of Westphalia. Only the Free State of Lippe was not incorporated into North Rhine-Westphalia until January 1947. With that the majority of the regions left of the Upper Weser became North Rhine-Westphalian.

In the end, at the meeting of the Zone Advisory Board on 20 September 1946, Kopf's proposal with regard to the division of the British occupation zone into three large states proved to be capable of gaining a majority. Because this division of their occupation zone into relatively large states also met the interests of the British, on 8 November 1946 Regulation No. 55 of the British military government was issued, by which the State of Lower Saxony with its capital Hanover were founded, backdated to 1 November 1946. The state was formed by a merger of the Free States of Brunswick, of Oldenburg and of Schaumburg-Lippe with the previously formed State of Hanover. But there were exceptions:

- In the Free State of Brunswick, the eastern part of the district of Blankenburg and the exclave of Calvörde, which belonged to the district of Helmstedt fell into the Soviet Zone of Occupation and were later integrated into the state of Saxony-Anhalt.
- In the State of Hanover, Amt Neuhaus and the villages of Neu Bleckede and Neu Wendischthun were allotted to the Soviet Zone and thus the subsequent East Germany. They were not returned to Lower Saxony until 1993.
- The city of Wesermünde that then lay in the Regierungsbezirk Stade was renamed in 1947 to Bremerhaven and incorporated into the new city-state of Bremen, which became one of the federated German states.

The demands of Dutch politicians that the Netherlands should be given the German regions east of the Dutch-German border as war reparations, were roundly rejected at the London Conference of 26 March 1949. In fact only about 1.3 km^{2} (0.50 sq mi) of west Lower Saxony was transferred to the Netherlands, in 1949.

→ see main article Dutch annexation of German territory after World War II

=== History of Lower Saxony as a state ===
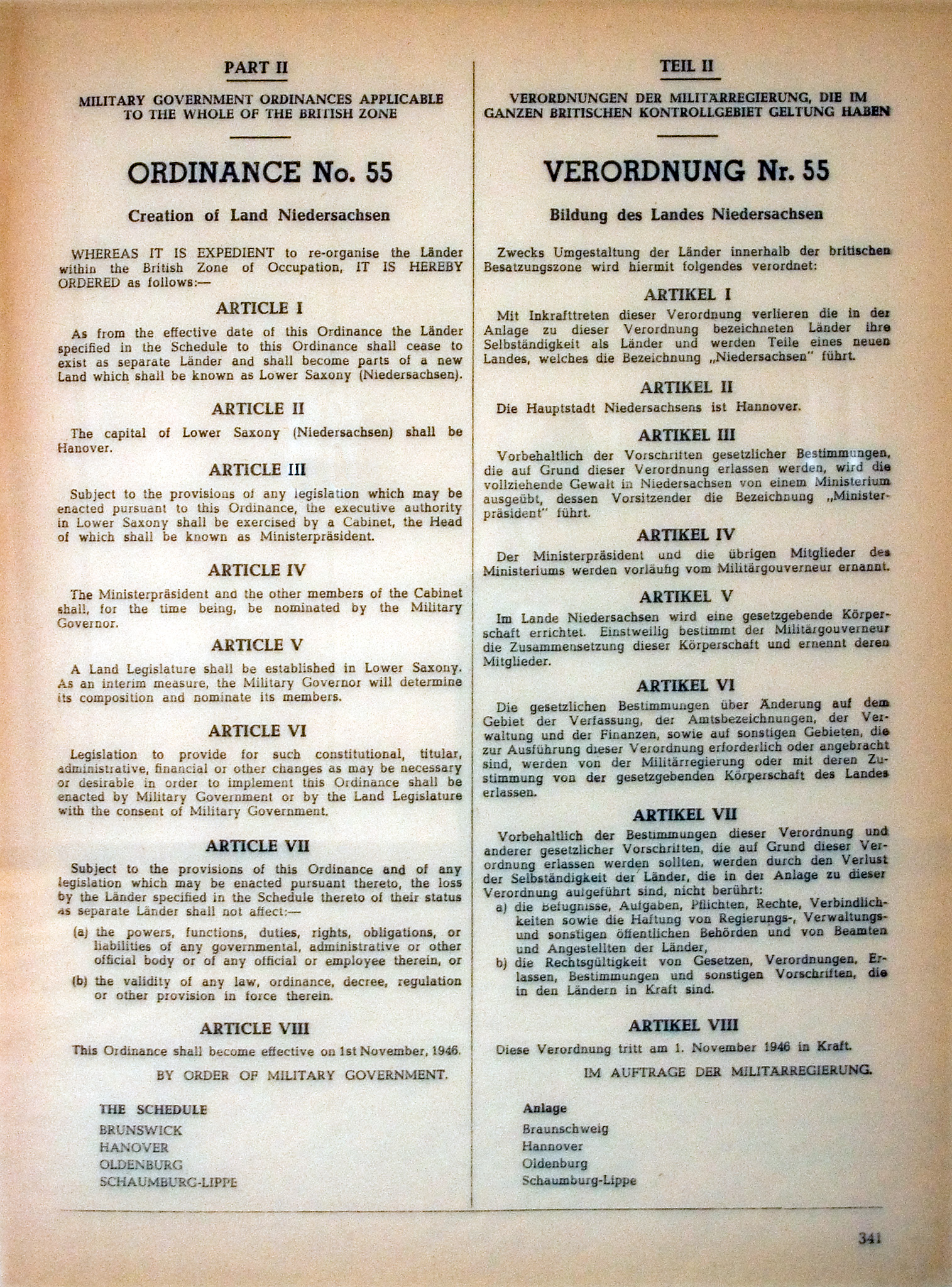
Ordinance No. 55, with which on 22 November 1946 the British military government founded the state Lower Saxony retroactively to 1 November 1946

The first Lower Saxon parliament or Landtag met on 9 December 1946. It was not elected; rather it was established by the British Occupation Administration (a so-called "appointed parliament"). That same day the parliament elected the Social Democrat, Hinrich Wilhelm Kopf, the former Hanoverian president (Regierungspräsident) as their first minister-president. Kopf led a five-party coalition, whose basic task was to rebuild a state afflicted by the war's rigours. Kopf's cabinet had to organise an improvement of food supplies and the reconstruction of the cities and towns destroyed by Allied air raids during the war years. Hinrich Wilhelm Kopf remained – interrupted by the time in office of Heinrich Hellwege (1955–1959) – as the head of government in Lower Saxony until 1961.

The greatest problem facing the first state government in the immediate post-war years was the challenge of integrating hundreds of thousands of refugees from Germany's former territories in the east (such as Silesia and East Prussia), which had been annexed by Poland and the Soviet Union. Lower Saxony was at the western end of the direct escape route from East Prussia and had the longest border with the Soviet Zone. On 3 October 1950 Lower Saxony took over the sponsorship of the very large number of refugees from Silesia. In 1950 there was still a shortage of 730,000 homes according to official figures.

During the period when Germany was divided, the Lower Saxon border crossing at Helmstedt found itself on the main transport artery to West Berlin and, from 1945 to 1990 was the busiest European border crossing point.

Of economic significance for the state was the Volkswagen concern, that restarted the production of civilian vehicles in 1945, initially under British management, and in 1949 transferred into the ownership of the newly founded country of West Germany and state of Lower Saxony. Overall, Lower Saxony, with its large tracts of rural countryside and few urban centres, was one of the industrially weaker regions of the federal republic for a long time. In 1960, 20% of the working population worked on the land. In the rest of the federal territory the figure was just 14%. Even in economically prosperous times the jobless totals in Lower Saxony are constantly higher than the federal average.

In 1961 Georg Diederichs took office as the minister president of Lower Saxony as the successor to Hinrich Wilhelm Kopf. He was replaced in 1970 by Alfred Kubel. The arguments about the Gorleben Nuclear Waste Repository, that began during the time in office of minister president Ernst Albrecht (1976–1990), have played an important role in state and federal politics since the end of the 1970s.

In 1990 Gerhard Schröder entered the office of minister-president. On 1 June 1993, the new Lower Saxon constitution entered force, replacing the "Provisional Lower Saxon Constitution" of 1951. It enables referendums and plebiscites and establishes environmental protection as a fundamental state principle.

The former Hanoverian Amt Neuhaus with its parishes of Dellien, Haar, Kaarßen, Neuhaus (Elbe), Stapel, Sückau, Sumte and Tripkau as well as the villages of Neu Bleckede, Neu Wendischthun and Stiepelse in the parish of Teldau and the historic Hanoverian region in the forest district of Bohldamm in the parish of Garlitz transferred with effect from 30 June 1993 from Mecklenburg-Vorpommern to Lower Saxony (Lüneburg district). From these parishes the new municipality of Amt Neuhaus was created on 1 October 1993.

In 1998 Gerhard Glogowski succeeded Gerhard Schröder who became Federal Chancellor. Because he had been linked with various scandals in his home city of Brunswick, he resigned in 1999 and was replaced by Sigmar Gabriel.

From 2003 to his election as Federal President in 2010 Christian Wulff was minister president in Lower Saxony. The Osnabrücker headed a CDU-led coalition with the FDP as does his successor, David McAllister. After the elections on 20 January 2013 McAllister was deselected.

== Demographics ==
Historical population
Year	Pop.	±%
1950	6,796,500	—
1960	6,576,137	−3.2%
1970	7,121,824	+8.3%
1980	7,256,386	+1.9%
1990	7,393,302	+1.9%
2001	7,956,416	+7.6%
2011	7,777,992	−2.2%
2022	7,943,265	+2.1%

At the end of 2014, there were almost 571,000 non-German citizens in Lower Saxony. At the end of 2023, there were almost 1,085,315 non-German citizens in Lower Saxony.

The highest share of migrants to Germans in Lower Saxony is in the urban agglomeration of Braunschweig (44.8%) which consists the most populated parts of Salzgitter e.g Lebenstedt or Thiede, the town Wolfenbüttel, parts of the districts Landkreis Peine, Landkreis Gifhorn, Landkreis Helmstedt and Landkreis Wolfenbüttel. 57.5% of Salzgitter have a migration background, which has the highest percentage of people with a foreign background in Lower Saxony.

The following table illustrates the largest minority groups in Lower Saxony:

Rank	Nationality	Population estimate (31.12.2022)	Population estimate (31.12.2023)
1	Ukraine	122,130	120,325
2	Poland	101,355	102,760
3	Syria	96,330	100,310
4	Turkey	90,715	96,405
5	Romania	64,675	79,890
6	Iraq	45,360	47,415
7	Bulgaria	31,155	36,410
8	Afghanistan	26,755	31,270
9	Netherlands	29,725	29,300
10	Italy	28,950	29,085

=== Vital statistics ===
- Births from January–October 2016 = ▲62,761
- Births from January–October 2017 = ▼61,314
- Deaths from January–October 2016 = ▼75,733
- Deaths from January–October 2017 = ▲75,804
- Natural growth from January–October 2016 = ▲ -12,972
- Natural growth from January–October 2017 = ▼ -14,490

=== Religion ===
Religion in Lower Saxony (Census 2011):
1. Protestant Church (51.5%)
2. Roman Catholicism (18.3%)
3. Evangelical Free Churches (1.26%)
4. Orthodox Church (0.85%)
5. Jewish (0.07%)
6. Other religions (2.20%)
7. Not religious (25.8%)

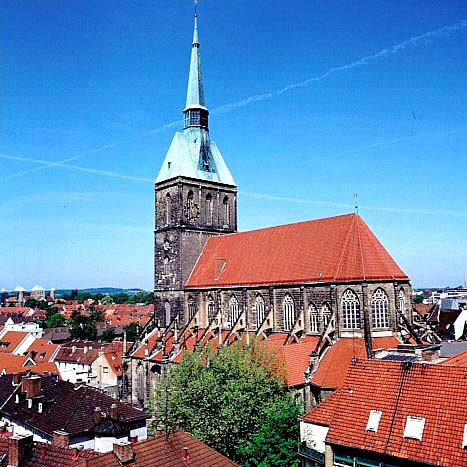
St. Andreas, Hildesheim

The 2011 census stated that a majority of the population were Christians (71.93%); 51.48% of the total population were members of the Protestant Church in Germany, 18.34% were Catholics, 2.11% were members of other Christian denominations, 2.27% were members of other religions. 25.8% have no denomination. Even though there is a high level of official belonging to a Christian denomination, the people – especially in the cities – are highly secular in behaviour.

As of 2025, the Protestant Church in Germany was the faith of 35.5% of the population. It is organised in the five Landeskirchen named Evangelical Lutheran State Church in Brunswick (comprising the former Free State of Brunswick), Evangelical Lutheran Church of Hanover (comprising the former Province of Hanover), Evangelical Lutheran Church in Oldenburg (comprising the former Free State of Oldenburg), Evangelical Lutheran Church of Schaumburg-Lippe (comprising the former Free State of Schaumburg-Lippe), and Evangelical Reformed Church (covering all the state).

Together, these member churches of the Protestant Church in Germany gather a substantial part of the Protestant population in Germany.

The Catholic Church was the faith of 14.5% of the population in 2025. It is organised in the three dioceses of Osnabrück (western part of the state), Münster (comprising the former Free State of Oldenburg) and Hildesheim (northern and eastern part of the state). The Catholic faith is mainly concentrated to the regions of Oldenburger Münsterland, the region of Osnabrück, the region of Hildesheim and in the Western Eichsfeld. 50.0% of the Low Saxons were irreligious or adhere to other religions. Judaism, Islam and Buddhism are minority faiths.

== Economy ==
The gross domestic product (GDP) of the state was 229.5 billion euros in 2018, accounting for 8.7% of German economic output. GDP per capita adjusted for purchasing power was 33,700 euros or 112% of the EU27 average in the same year. The GDP per employee was 100% of the EU average.

Agriculture, strongly weighted towards the livestock sector, has always been a very important economic factor in the state. The north and northwest of Lower Saxony are mainly made up of coarse sandy soil that makes crop farming difficult and therefore grassland and cattle farming are more prevalent in those areas. Lower Saxony is home, in 2017, to one in five of Germany's cattle, one in three of the country's pigs, and 50% of its hens. Wheat, potatoes, rye, and oats are among the state's present-day arable crops. Towards the south and southeast, extensive loess layers in the soil left behind by the last ice age allow high-yield crop farming. One of the principal crops there is sugar beet. Consequently, the Land has a big food industry, mainly organised in small and medium-sized enterprises (SME). Big players are Deutsches Milchkontor and PHW Group (biggest German poultry farmer and producer).

Mining has also been an important source of income in Lower Saxony for centuries. Silver ore became a foundation of notable economic prosperity in the Harz Mountains as early as the 12th century, while iron mining in the Salzgitter area and salt mining in various areas of the state became another important economic backbone. Although overall yields are comparatively low, Lower Saxony is also an important supplier of crude oil in the European Union. Mineral products still mined today include iron.

Radioactive waste is frequently transported in the area to the city of Salzgitter, for the deep geological repository Schacht Konrad and between Schacht Asse II in the Wolfenbüttel district and Lindwedel and Höfer.

Manufacturing is another large part of the regional economy. Despite decades of gradual downsizing and restructuring, the carmaker Volkswagen with its five production plants within the state's borders still remains the single biggest private-sector employer, its world headquarters in Wolfsburg. Due to the Volkswagen Law, which has recently been ruled illegal by the European Union's high court, the state of Lower Saxony is still the second-largest shareholder, owning 20.3% of the company. Thanks to the importance of car manufacturing in Lower Saxony, a thriving supply industry is centred around its regional focal points. Other mainstays of the Lower Saxon industrial sector include aviation (the region of Stade is called CFK-Valley), shipbuilding (such as Meyer Werft), biotechnology, and steel. Medicine plays a major role; Hanover and Göttingen have two large University Medical Schools and hospitals, and Otto Bock in Duderstadt is the largest producer of prosthetics and associated componentry in the world.

The service sector has gained importance following the demise of manufacturing in the 1970s and 1980s. Important branches today are the tourism industry with TUI AG in Hanover, one of Europe's largest travel companies, as well as trade and telecommunications. Hanover is one of Germany's main hubs for insurance and financial-services companies, for example Talanx and Hannover Re.

In October 2018, the Lower Saxony unemployment rate stood at 5.0% and was marginally higher than the national average.

Year	2000	2001	2002	2003	2004	2005	2006	2007	2008	2009	2010	2011	2012	2013	2014	2015	2016	2017	2018
Unemployment rate in %	9.3	9.1	9.2	9.6	9.6	11.6	10.5	8.8	7.6	7.7	7.5	6.9	6.6	6.6	6.5	6.1	6.0	5.8	5.3

=== World Heritage Sites ===
Lower Saxony has four World Heritage Sites.

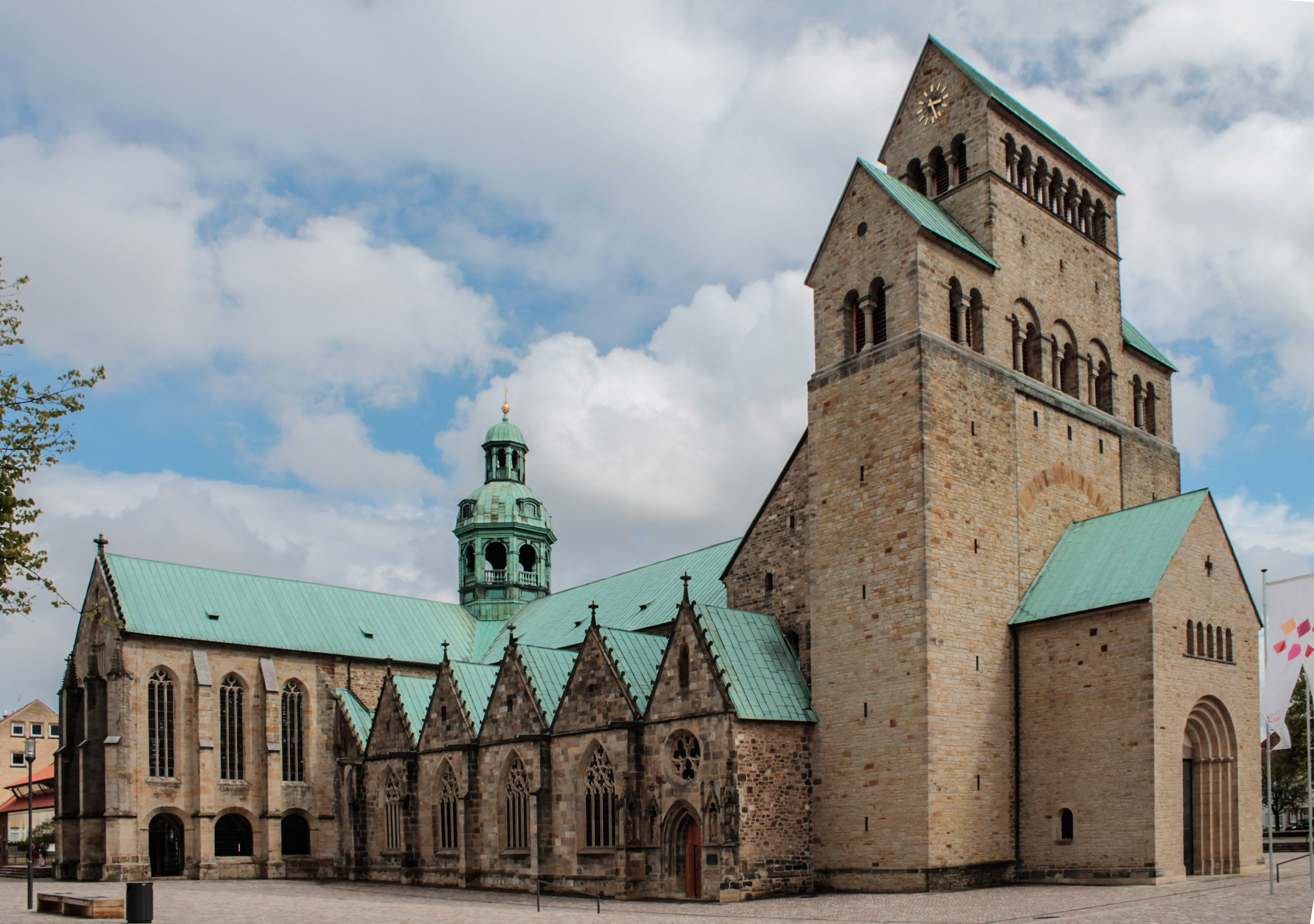
Hildesheim Cathedral

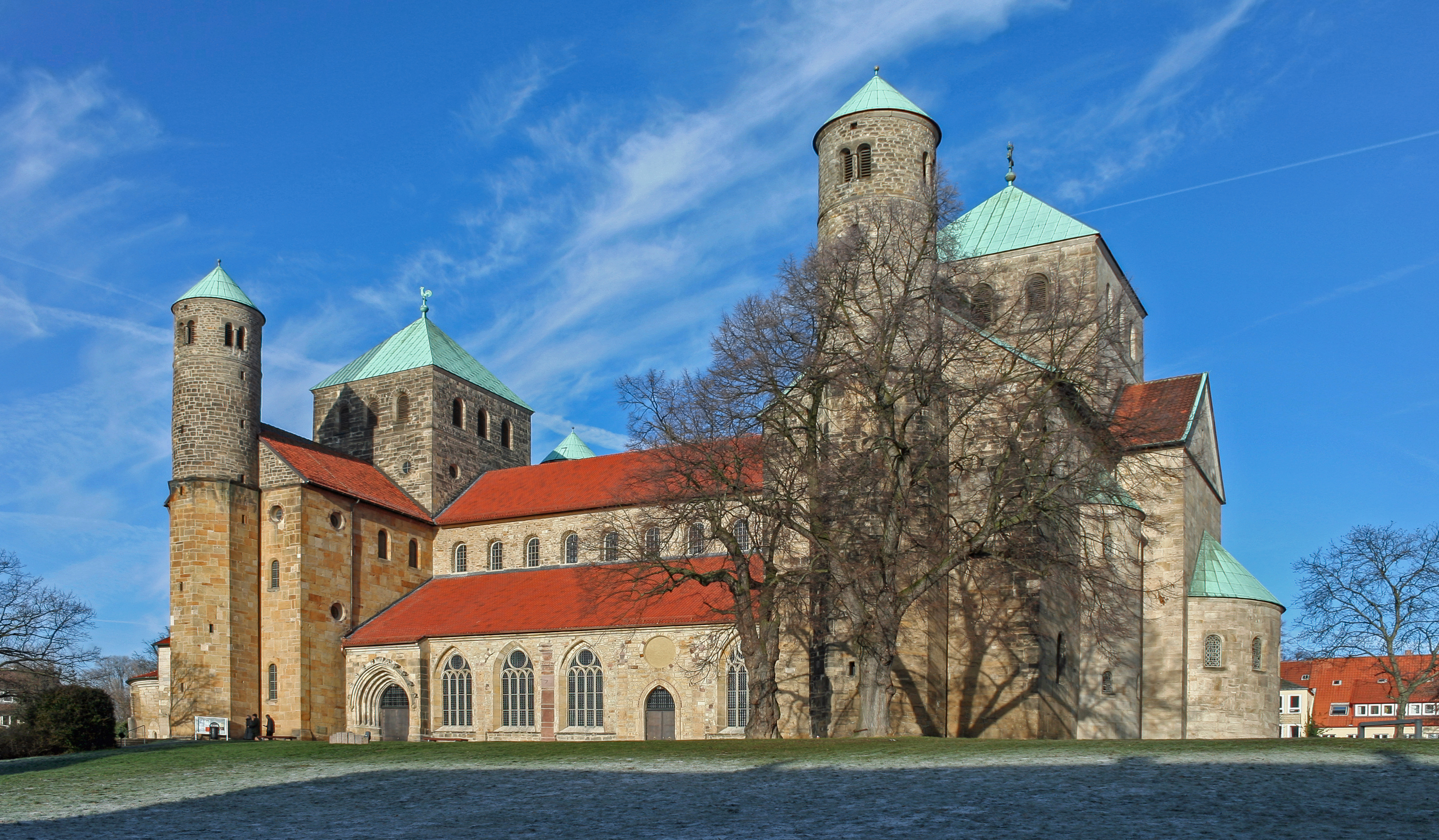
St. Michael's Church in Hildesheim

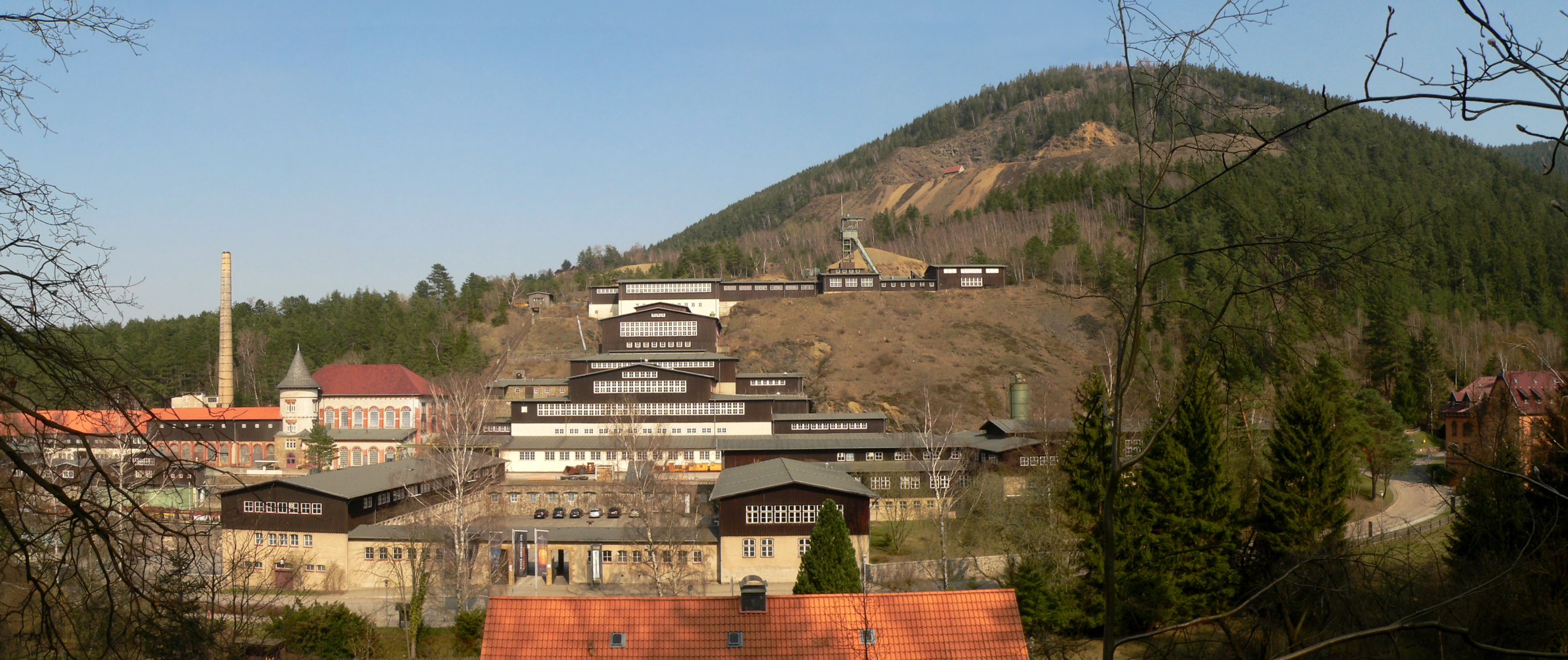
Mines of Rammelsberg

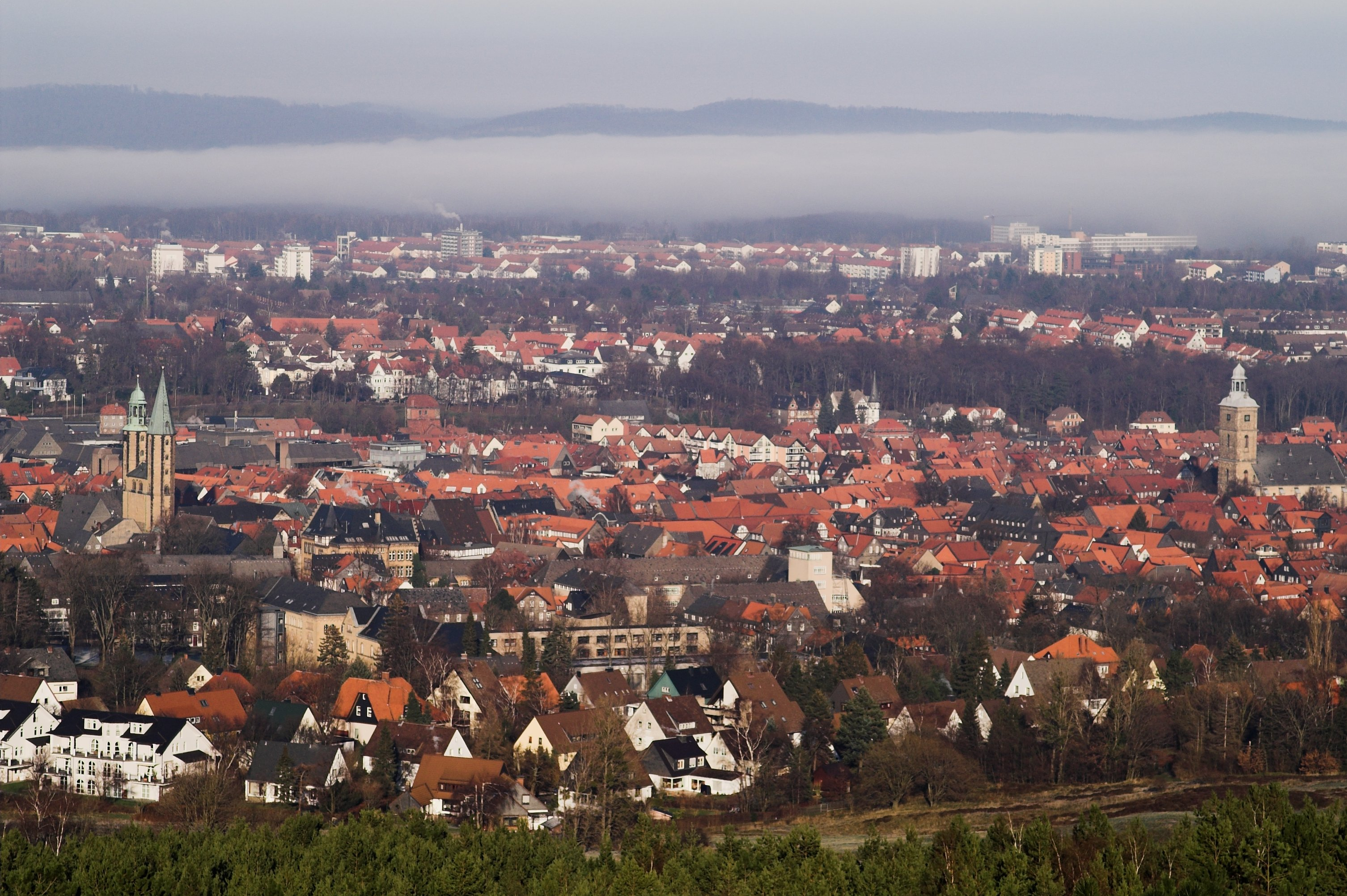
Historic Town of Goslar

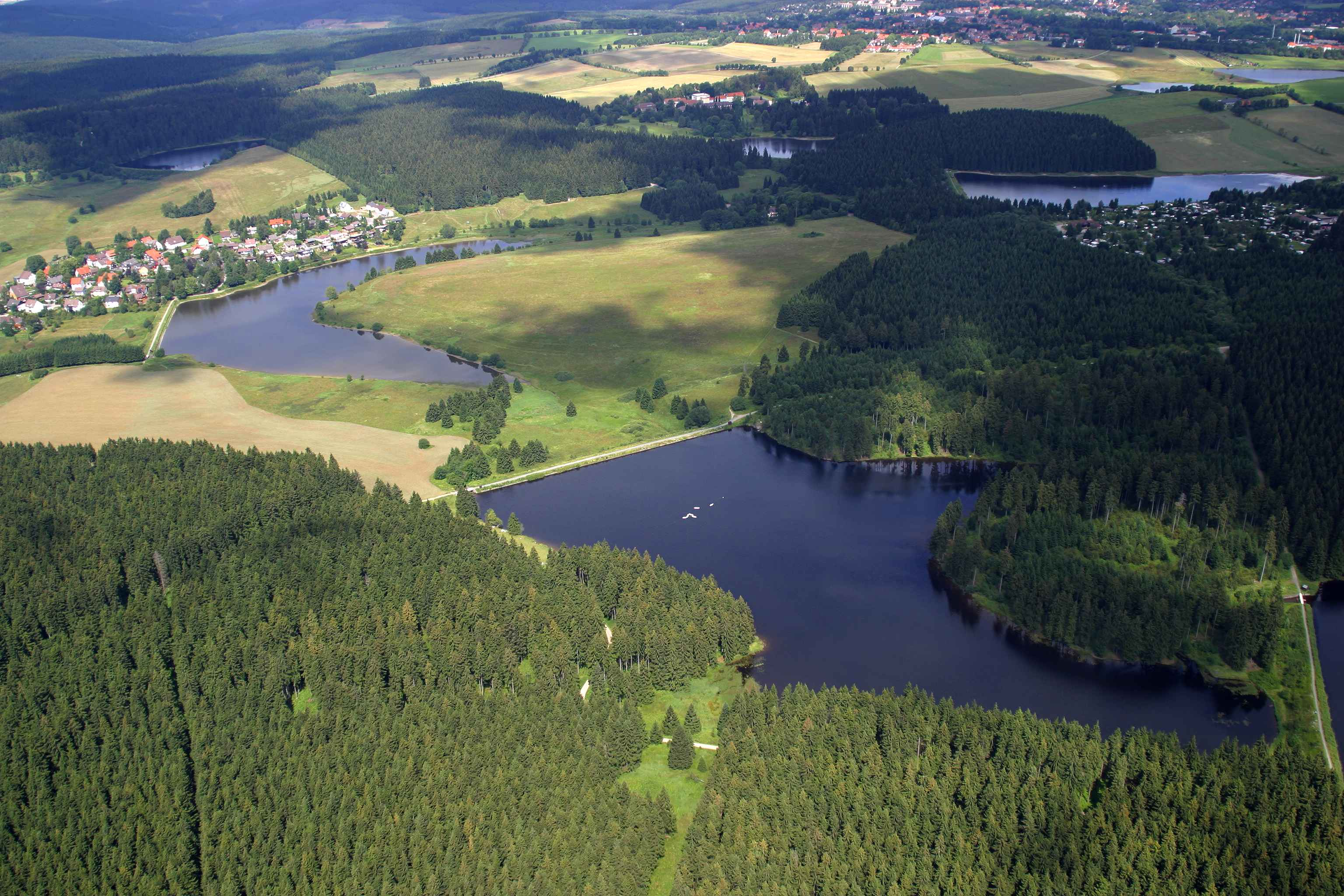
Upper Harz Water Regale

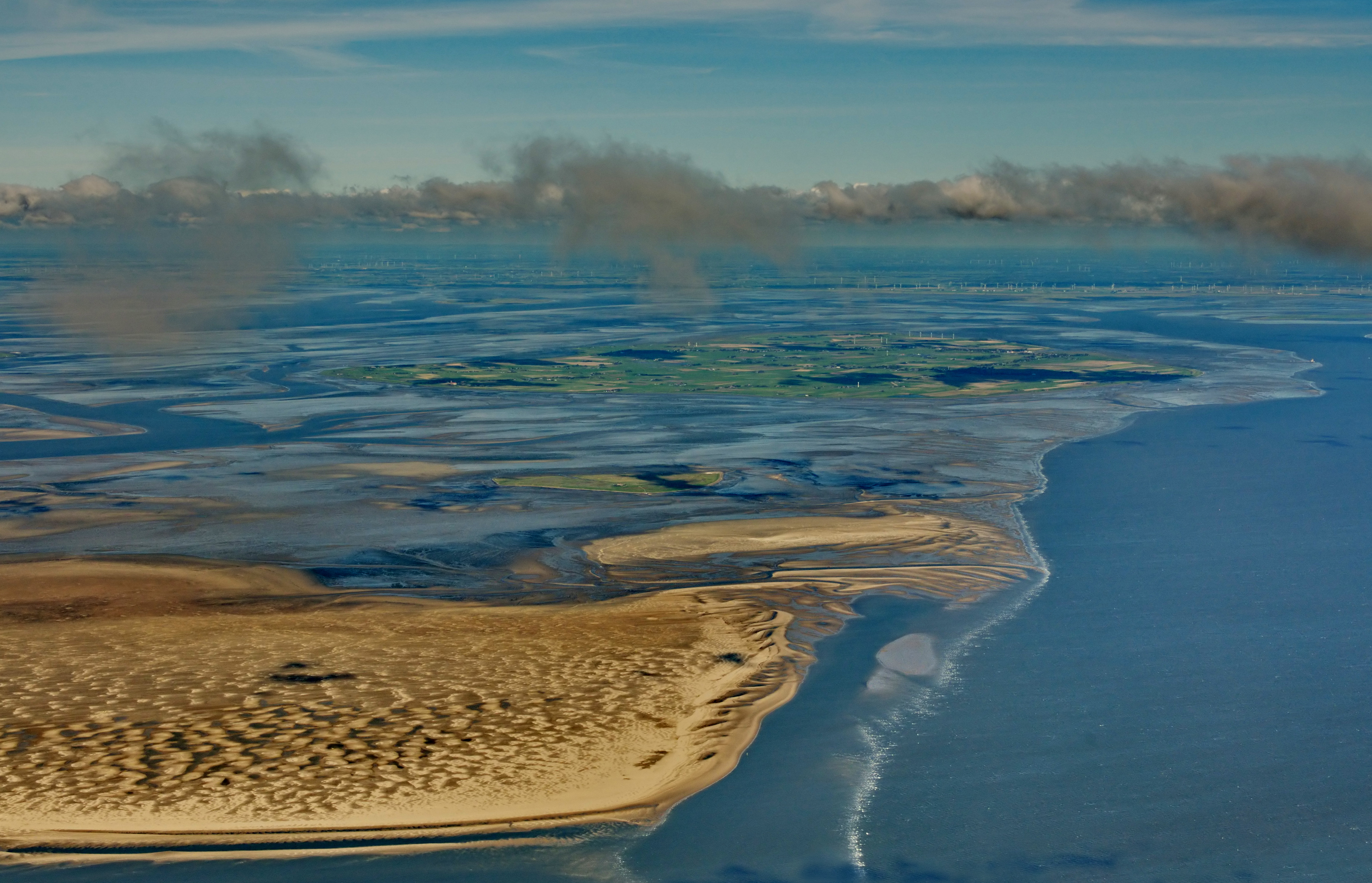
Lower Saxony Wadden Sea

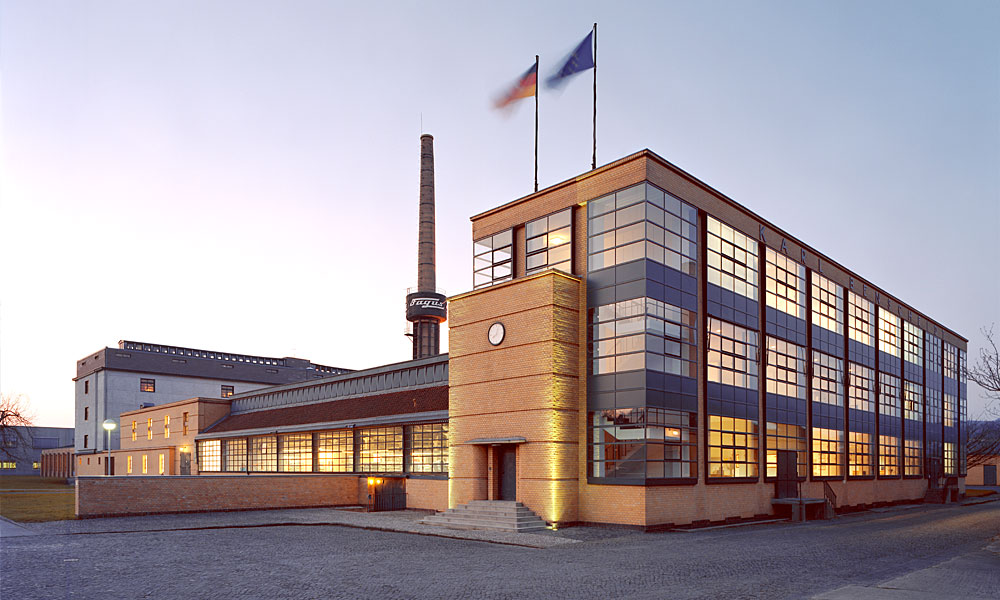
Fagus Factory in Alfeld

== Transport ==
The state's main airport is Hannover Airport which provides flights to other parts of Germany and other European destinations.

== Politics ==
- Cabinets of Lower Saxony

Since 1948, politics in the state have been dominated by the centre-right Christian Democratic Union (CDU) and the centre-left Social Democratic Party (SPD). Lower Saxony was one of the origins of the German environmentalist movement in reaction to the state government's support for underground nuclear waste disposal. This led to the formation of the German Green Party in 1980. Germany's multi-party system generally requires coalitions to be made because parties usually do not have outright majorities.

The Minister-President heads the state government, acting as a head of state (even if the federated states have the status of a state do not establish the office of a head of state but merge the functions with the head of the executive branch) as well as the government leader. They are elected by the Landtag of Lower Saxony.

The former Minister-President, Christian Wulff, led a coalition of his CDU with the Free Democratic Party between 2003 and 2010. In the 2008 election, the ruling CDU held on to its position as the leading party in the state, despite losing votes and seats. The CDU's coalition with the Free Democratic Party retained its majority although it was cut from 29 to 10. The election also saw the entry into the state parliament for the first time of the leftist The Left party. On 1 July 2010 David McAllister was elected Minister-President.

After the state election on 20 January 2013, Stephan Weil of the Social Democrats was elected as the new Minister-President. He governed in coalition with the Greens. After the state election in September 2017, Stephan Weil remained Minister-President, with the SDP in coalition with the CDU. After the 2022 Election, Weil was once again elected as Minister-President with an SDP-Greens coalition.

=== Constitution ===
The state of Lower Saxony was formed after World War II by merging the former states of Hanover, Oldenburg, Brunswick and Schaumburg-Lippe. Hanover, a former kingdom, is by far the largest of these contributors by area and population and has been a province of Prussia since 1866. The city of Hanover is the largest and capital city of Lower Saxony.

The constitution states that Lower Saxony be a free, republican, democratic, social and environmentally sustainable state inside the Federal Republic of Germany; universal human rights, peace and justice are preassigned guidelines of society, and the human rights and civil liberties proclaimed by the constitution of the Federal Republic are genuine constituents of the constitution of Lower Saxony. Each citizen is entitled to education and there is universal compulsory school attendance.

All government authority is to be sanctioned by the will of the people, which expresses itself via elections and plebiscites. The legislative assembly is a unicameral parliament elected for terms of five years. The composition of the parliament obeys the principle of proportional representation of the participating political parties, but it is also ensured that each constituency delegates one directly elected representative. If a party wins more constituency delegates than their statewide share among the parties would determine, it can keep all these constituency delegates.

The states of the Federal Republic of Germany, and so Lower Saxony, have legislative responsibility and power mainly reduced to the policy fields of the school system, higher education, culture and media and police, while other policy fields like economic and social policies, foreign policy are a prerogative of the federal government. Hence the probably most important function of the federal states is their representation in the Federal Council (Bundesrat), where their approval on many crucial federal policy fields, including the tax system, is required for laws to become enacted.

== Coat of arms ==
The coat of arms shows a white horse (Saxon Steed) against a red background, which is an old symbol of the Saxon people. Legend has it that the horse was a symbol of the Saxon leader Widukind, albeit a black horse against a yellow background. The colours changed after the Christian baptism of Widukind. White and red are colours (besides black and gold) of the Holy Roman Empire symbolising Christ as the saviour, who is still shown with a red cross against a white background.

== See also ==
- List of places in Lower Saxony
- Straße der Megalithkultur – tourist route from Osnabrück to Oldenburg via some 33 Megalithic sites.
- Niedersächsische Spargelstraße – tourist route around the Asparagus growing areas.
- Straße der Weserrenaissance – tourist route that passes through Lower Saxony
- Outline of Germany
