= Schaumburg Land =

The Schaumburg Land (German: Schaumburger Land) is a strip of land in the German federal state of Lower Saxony lying between Lake Steinhude, Schaumburg Forest, Minden Land, the Weser Hills and the Deister. Historically it consisted of the former states of Schaumburg-Lippe in the area of Bückeburg - Obernkirchen and Stadthagen and the County of Schaumburg Hessian portion`Grafschaft Schaumburg hessischen Anteils`, ruled in personal union by Hesse-Cassel in the area of Rinteln. The region is agricultural in nature, but comparatively densely populated. It has many independent traditions and customs. Even Schaumburg's traditional costume is known outside the region. Today the Schaumburg Land covers much the same area as the district of Schaumburg.
