= Hinrich Wilhelm Kopf =

German politician (1893–1961)

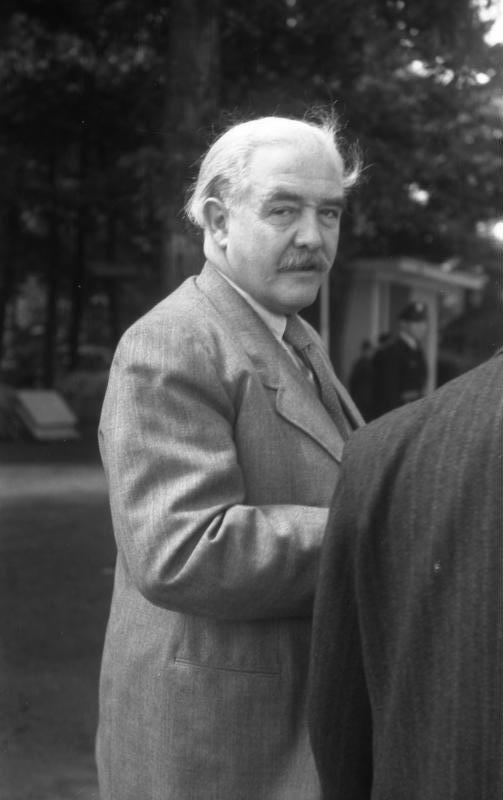
- Kopf in 1948

Minister-President of Lower Saxony
- In office 1946–1955
- Succeeded by: Heinrich Hellwege
- In office 1959–1961
- Preceded by: Heinrich Hellwege
- Succeeded by: Georg Diederichs

President of the German Bundesrat
- In office 7 September 1951 – 6 September 1952
- Preceded by: Hans Ehard
- Succeeded by: Reinhold Maier

Personal details
- Born: 8 May 1893 Neuenkirchen, Hanover
- Died: 21 December 1961 (aged 68) Göttingen, Lower Saxony
- Party: Social Democratic Party of Germany

Hinrich Wilhelm Kopf (6 May 1893 – 21 December 1961) was a German politician for the SPD, who was a major figure in the founding and leadership of Lower Saxony in the aftermath of World War II.

== Early life ==
Kopf was born in Neuenkirchen, Hanover in 1893, and joined the SPD in 1919.

== World War II ==
Despite his political affiliations, from 1939 to 1943 Kopf worked on behalf of the Nazi government as an asset manager in occupied Poland, initially with his own company alongside the lawyer Edmund Bohne, and later for the Haupttreuhandstelle Ost. He was a "trustee of confiscated Polish and Jewish goods" and expropriation commissioner in the Lubliniec region of Poland.

== Post-war political career ==
Chosen to head of the government of the Province of Hanover by the British occupation authorities in June 1945, he was named Oberpräsident in September 1945. He then served as minister-president of the short-lived State of Hanover from August to November 1946, and subsequently as minister president of Lower Saxony from 1946 to 1955.

In 1948, Polish authorities requested his extradition for being involved in deportations, abusing Polish workers, and confiscating Jewish property. However, Military Governor Brian Robertson dismissed the allegations, stating they were "insufficient." Kopf served as the third president of the Bundesrat from 7 September 1951 to 6 September 1952, and later a second term as minister president of Lower Saxony from 1959 to 1961. Kopf died in office at the city of Göttingen.

His grave is located in the Stöcken city cemetery in Hanover, and was a declared an honorary grave of the city until 2015, after his Nazi ties became more widely known.
