= State of Hanover =

Short-lived state of Germany (Aug-Nov 1946); now part of Lower Saxony

State of Hanover Land Hannover
- State of Allied-occupied Germany
- 1946
- Flag

- Map of the State of Hanover, coloured red, within the British Zone of Occupation
- Capital: Hanover
- Government
  - Type: Republic
- Minister-President
  - 1946: Hinrich Wilhelm Kopf
- Historical era: Cold War
  - Established: 23 August 1946
  - Disestablished: 23 November 1946
Preceded by	Succeeded by
Province of Hanover	Lower Saxony
- Today part of: Germany

The State of Hanover (German: Land Hannover) was a short-lived state within the British Zone of Allied-occupied Germany. It existed for 92 days in the course of the dissolution of the Free State of Prussia after World War II until the foundation of Lower Saxony in 1946. The state saw itself in the tradition of the former Kingdom of Hanover, annexed by Prussia in 1866, reflected in the Saxon Steed state emblem. After Lower Saxony was founded by merging Hanover with several smaller states, it continued to use the Hanover emblems.

== Geography ==
The State of Hanover covered the territory of the former Prussian Province of Hanover without those eastern parts that had become part of the Soviet occupation zone after World War II (Amt Neuhaus and the eastern part of Bleckede, Elbingerode and Ilfeld). It, therefore, included 85 percent of the present-day state of Lower Saxony.

== History ==
After the Second World War, the State of Hanover was founded under Ordinance No. 46 of the British military government dated 23 August 1946 "concerning the dissolution of the provinces of the former State of Prussia in the British zone and their recreation as independent states". Its first minister-president was the Social Democratic politician Hinrich Wilhelm Kopf.

Nevertheless, on 1 November 1946 the British Military Government founded the new state of Lower Saxony from the unification of the German states of Brunswick, Oldenburg and Schaumburg-Lippe with Hanover, accepting the proposal of Hanoverian prime minister Kopf for a merger. He also discussed other territorial options for a Lower Saxony state which would have also included Bremen and the region of Ostwestfalen-Lippe.

Like the eastern parts of Hanover, the eastern areas of Brunswick which had fallen to the Soviet zone, including the former County of Blankenburg and the exclave of Calvörde (part of the Helmstedt district) were excluded and later integrated into the East German state of Saxony-Anhalt. Only the Hanoverian Amt Neuhaus and those parts of Bleckede, which had also lain on Soviet-occupied territory, were again united with Lower Saxony after the German reunification in 1990.

== See also ==
- Hanover (city)
- Hanover Region
