= Ordinance No. 46 =

1946 political restructuring law in the British Zone of Allied-occupied Germany

Ordinance No. 46 (full title: Abolition of the Provinces in the British Zone of the Former State of Prussia and Reconstitution thereof as Separate Länder), effective 23 August 1946, was an ordinance issued by the British Military Government (CCG/BE) in the British Zone of Allied-occupied Germany by which, among others, the Prussian Province of Schleswig-Holstein became the State of Schleswig-Holstein, and the Province of Hanover turned into the State of Hanover.

== See also ==
- Allied-occupied Germany
