= Otto Telschow =

German Nazi Party official (1876–1945)

Gauleiter of Gau Eastern Hanover
- In office 1 October 1928 – 8 May 1945
- Appointed by: Adolf Hitler
- Preceded by: Position established
- Succeeded by: Position abolished

Gauleiter of Gau Lüneburg-Stade
- In office 15 July 1925 – 1 October 1928
- Appointed by: Adolf Hitler
- Preceded by: Position established
- Succeeded by: Position abolished

Personal details
- Born: 27 February 1876 Wittenberge, Province of Brandenburg, Kingdom of Prussia, German Empire
- Died: 31 May 1945 (aged 69) Lüneburg, Allied-occupied Germany
- Cause of death: Suicide
- Party: Nazi Party
- Other political affiliations: German Social Party; Deutschvölkischer Schutz- und Trutzbund; German Völkisch Freedom Party
- Occupation: Police Administrator
- Civilian awards: Golden Party Badge

Military service
- Allegiance: German Empire
- Branch/service: Royal Prussian Army
- Years of service: 1893–1902; 1914–1919
- Rank: Unteroffizier
- Unit: 11th (2nd Brandenburg) Uhlan Regiment; 15th (Hanover) Hussar Regiment
- Battles/wars: World War I
- Military awards: Iron Cross, 2nd class

Otto Telschow (27 February 1876 – 31 May 1945) was a German soldier and police administrator who became the Nazi Party Gauleiter in eastern Hanover from 1925 to 1945. At the end of the Second World War, he was captured by British forces and committed suicide while in custody.

== Early life ==
Telschow was born in Wittenberge, the son of a judicial officer. Until 1893 he was a student at the Royal Prussian boys' military education institute in Annaburg. Trained as a cavalryman, he served until 1897 with the 11th (2nd Brandenburg) Uhlan Regiment in Saarburg and from 1898 to 1902 with the 15th (Hanover) Hussar Regiment ("Queen Wilhelmina of the Netherlands") in Wandsbek, attaining the rank of sergeant.

In 1902, Telschow resigned from the military and became an administrative police official in Hamburg. He joined the antisemitic German Social Party in 1905. He served with the police until the beginning of the First World War. He was drafted as a field hospital inspector and served from 1914 to 1917 on the front lines in Flanders, Romania and the Baltic States, earning the Iron Cross, 2nd class. From the end of 1917 to the end of 1918, he worked as a hospital chief inspector in Reserve Hospital III in Bremen.

After the war, Telschow resumed his police career, working from 1919 to 1924 as an administrative officer in the Hamburg police department. He was dismissed from the police in March 1924 because of his activities as district leader of the radically Völkisch and antisemitic German Völkisch Freedom Party (DVFP) in the Harburg district. From 1924 to July 1925, he was the leader of the DVFP in Lüneburg and Stade, the two eastern Regierungsbezirke (government districts) of the Prussian Province of Hanover. He was also a member of the German Deutschvölkischer Schutz- und Trutzbund, the largest and most active antisemitic federation in Germany.

== Nazi career ==
When the ban that had been imposed on the Nazi Party in the wake of the failed Beer Hall Putsch was lifted and the Party was re-founded on 27 February 1925, Telschow was charged with organizing the Party in Lüneburg and Stade. In June 1925, he founded an Ortsgruppe (local district) in Buchholz, the first Nazi local organization in northern Lower Saxony. Telschow formally joined the Nazi Party in July (membership number 7,057) and, on 15 July, Adolf Hitler formally named him Gauleiter of Gau Lüneburg-Stade. As an early Party member, he later would be awarded the Golden Party Badge.

On 10 September 1925, Telschow joined the National Socialist Working Association, headed by Gregor Strasser. This was an association of northern and northwestern Gauleiters who supported the "revolutionary" left wing of the Party (as opposed to the more moderate wing that advocated participation in electoral campaigns) until it was dissolved in 1926 following the Bamberg Conference.

On 20 May 1928, Telschow was defeated in his first bid to be elected to the Reichstag and to the Prussian Landtag. On 1 October 1928, Telschow's Gau was renamed Gau Eastern Hanover and he was retained as Gauleiter, serving until the end of the Nazi regime in May 1945. Also in October 1928, Telschow founded the weekly Nazi newspaper Niedersachsen-Stürmer (Lower Saxon Stormer) which he published until May 1945. He also often gave speeches against Jews, Freemasons and Communists. In November 1929, he was elected to the Hanover Provincial Landtag. In September 1930, he was elected to the Reichstag for electoral constituency 15, East Hanover, and retained this seat until May 1945.

After the Nazi seizure of power, Telschow was named president of the provincial Landtag in April 1933. On 10 April, he was appointed a member of the Prussian State Council. He was retained as a member when it was reconstituted by Prussian Ministerpräsident Hermann Göring as an advisory body and convened on 15 September 1933. In 1934, Telschow was made a Prussian Provincial Councilor for the Province of Hanover and, in September 1935, he was named to the Academy for German Law. After the outbreak of the Second World War, Telschow served as a member of the Defense Committee for Wehrkreis (military district) XI from 22 September 1939. On 15 November 1940, he was made the Gau Housing Commissioner for his jurisdiction and, on 16 May 1941, he was charged with all municipal construction for the city of Lüneburg.

Unlike most other Gauleiters, Telschow was not a member of either the SA or the SS. One of the older Gauleiters, and not particularly ambitious or capable, Telschow often turned over the day-to-day running of his Gau to his deputy, Heinrich Peper. In the postwar memoir by Albert Krebs, the former Gauleiter of Hamburg, Telschow was characterized in this way:

On his frequent visits to our headquarters, we usually tried to compliment him out the door as quickly as possible because he kept us from working and also had nothing particularly clever to contribute to a conversation ... a man of undoubtedly honest intentions but not equipped with any noteworthy abilities … he knew nothing about the interconnections, background, and effective forces of politics or history.

In addition, complaints began to surface concerning multiple allegations of womanizing by Telschow. An investigation by Walter Buch's Supreme Party Court recommended the opening of formal proceedings against him. However, in December 1941, this was quashed due to the intervention of Martin Bormann who was familiar with Hitler's reluctance to discipline or remove any Alter Kämpfer (old fighter) that had been with him from the earliest days.

When, on 16 November 1942, the jurisdiction of the Reich Defense Commissioners was changed from the Wehrkreis to the Gau level, Telschow was appointed to this position for his Gau. In this capacity, he had jurisdiction over civil defense and evacuation measures, as well as control over the war economy, including rationing and suppression of black market activities.

== Arrest and suicide ==
Toward the close of the war, when British troops entered Lüneburg on 18 April 1945, Telschow fled from his villa to a hunting lodge near Dahlenburg. There he was arrested by British soldiers. He attempted suicide by slashing his wrists and ingesting poison while being transported back to Lüneburg, where he died on 31 May 1945.

== Sources ==
- Höffkes, Karl (1986). Hitlers Politische Generale. Die Gauleiter des Dritten Reiches: ein biographisches Nachschlagewerk. Tübingen: Grabert-Verlag. ISBN 3-87847-163-7.
- Klee, Ernst (2007). Das Personenlexikon zum Dritten Reich. Wer war was vor und nach 1945. Frankfurt-am-Main: Fischer-Taschenbuch-Verlag. ISBN 978-3-596-16048-8.
- Krebs, Albert (1976). The Infancy of Nazism: The Memoirs of Ex-Gauleiter Albert Krebs, 1923-1933. New Viewpoints. ISBN 978-0-531-05376-8.
- Miller, Michael D.; Schulz, Andreas (2021). Gauleiter: The Regional Leaders of the Nazi Party and Their Deputies, 1925–1945. Vol. 3 (Fritz Sauckel – Hans Zimmermann). Fonthill Media. ISBN 978-1-781-55826-3.
- Orlow, Dietrich (1969). The History of the Nazi Party: 1919–1933. University of Pittsburgh Press. ISBN 0-8229-3183-4.
