= Guelphic Legion =

Hanoverian pretender military unit (1866–70)

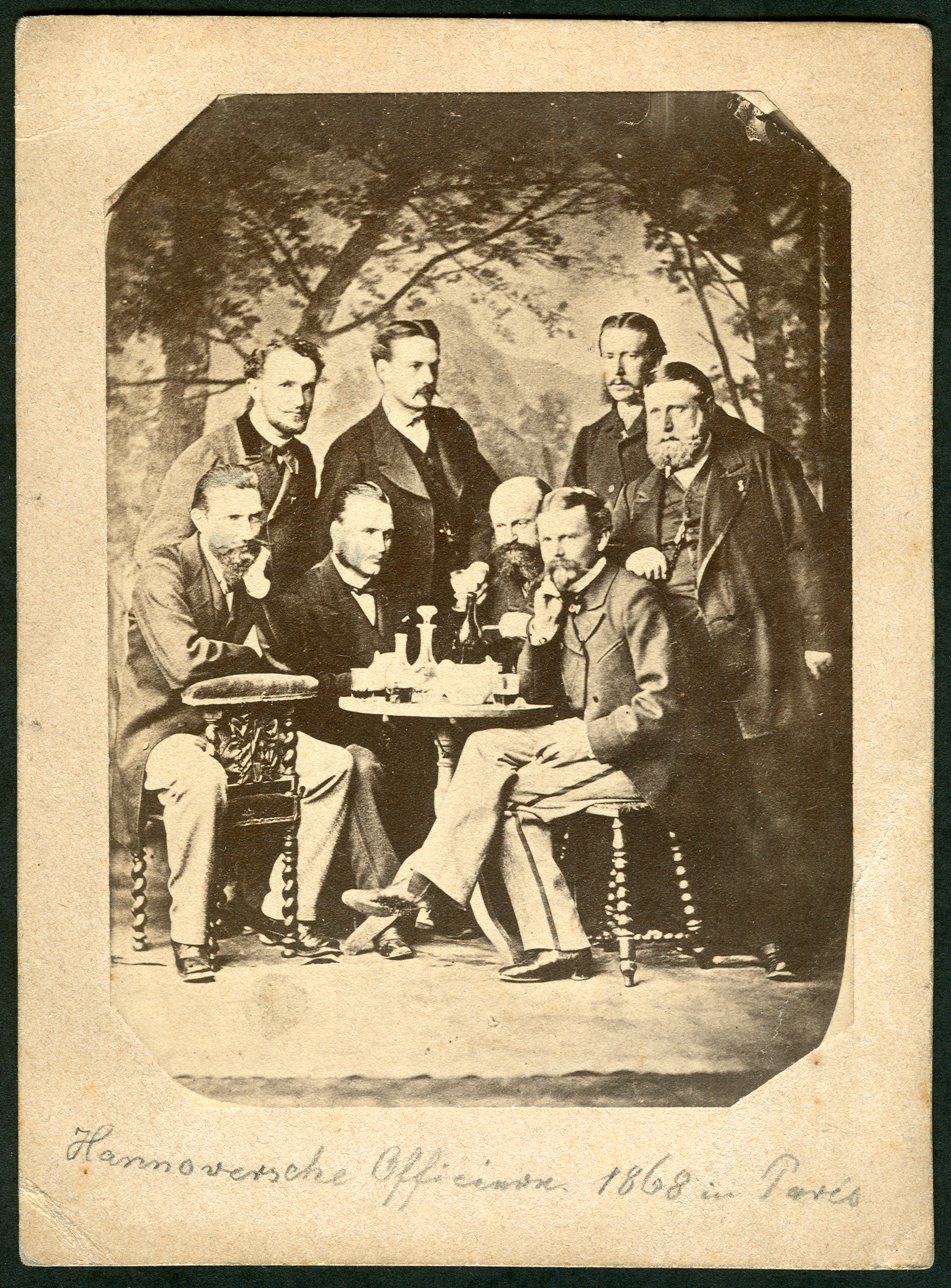
Hanoverian officers in Paris, 1868

The Guelphic Legion (German: Welfenlegion) was an irregular, volunteer military unit founded and maintained at the expense of the deposed Welf king George V of Hanover, after the annexation of the Kingdom of Hanover by Prussia in 1866.

== History ==
After the Austro-Prussian War, in the autumn of 1866, victorious Prussia annexed four former allies of the defeated Austrian forces north of the Main line: Hanover as well as Hesse-Kassel, Nassau, and the Free City of Frankfurt. While the former kingdom was incorporated as the Province of Hanover without any referendum or consultation; protests by the affected population led to the foundation of the anti-Prussian German-Hanoverian Party.

Upon the Hanoverian surrender after the Battle of Langensalza on 29 June 1866, the kingdom was occupied by Prussian troops and formally annexed on 20 September. During the Luxembourg Crisis between Prussia and France in spring 1867, a rising number of Hanoverian soldiers gathered at Arnhem in the Netherlands at the behest of exiled King George V and his newly established court at the Villa Hügel in Hietzing near Vienna. However, when a war was once again averted by the Treaty of London signed on 11 May, the Dutch government ordered all foreign troops to leave the country. After being raised as a sizeable force, the Legion migrated to Switzerland, where its numbers swelled to 700.

King George V, who never abandoned his claim to the Hanoverian throne, continued to maintain the Legion at his own expense while in exile in France. In February 1868 the unit moved from Switzerland to France at the same time as George V and Marie of Saxe-Altenburg celebrated their silver wedding anniversary in Paris. In 1869 the Prussian House of Representatives passed a law sequestering the funds of the former King of Hanover (Welfenfonds) in retaliation for his enmity and deployment of the Guelphic Legion.

The Guelphic Legion was formally dissolved on 15 April 1870. Each of the 1,400 legionnaires received 400 francs upon discharge and additional traveling expenses as needed. Many returned to Hanover, but some migrated to the United States or to other parts of Europe. George V, unreconciled and embittered, died in Paris on 12 June 1878.
