= East Hanover (electoral district) =

Former constituency of the Reichstag (Weimar Republic)

15 East Hanover Osthannover
- Former electoral constituency for the Reichstag
- Location within the Weimar Republic
- State: Prussia
- Province: Hanover
- Electorate: 566,486 (1919); 736,265 (1933)
- Major settlements: Harburg-Wilhelmsburg, Wesermünde, Lüneburg, Celle

Former constituency
- Created: 1920
- Abolished: 1938

East Hanover was one of the 35 electoral districts (German: Wahlkreise) used to elect members to the Reichstag during the Weimar Republic. It sent members to the Reichstag in eight democratic elections between 1920 and 1933. It existed nominally in the show elections to the Nazi Reichstag until 1938.

It was located in northwestern Germany and comprised the contemporary Regierungsbezirke of Lüneburg and Stade from the Prussian province of Hanover. It was constituency 15 in the numbering scheme.

== Electoral system ==
The constituency was created for the 1920 election, following the redrawing of districts in the Hanover/Hamburg region. Under the proportional representation electoral system of the Weimar Republic, voters cast a vote for party lists. Parties were awarded a seat for every 60,000 votes in a constituency. Excess votes were aggregated at two higher levels of seat distribution: an intermediate level combining multiple constituencies, where extra seats were awarded to parties' constituency lists, and a national level where seats were awarded to national lists of each party or alliance.

== Results (1919–1933) ==
=== Vote share ===
Party	1919 (Note: Notional results on 1920 boundaries.)	1920	1924 I	1924 II	1928	1930	1932 I	1932 II	1933
KPD		0.5	7.9	4.4	5.8	7.5	8.2	10.4	7.5
USPD	3.8	10.8		0.3					
SPD	38.5	27.3	21.3	28.1	32.8	28.1	24.5	23.4	19.7
DDP	14.5	6.1	3.8	4.1	3.7	3.6	1.0	0.7	0.6
Centre	9.6	1.1	1.1	1.3	1.3	1.3	1.4	1.3	1.3
DHP	21.8	34.3	30.2	24.5	19.1	15.0	4.6	6.3	4.2
DVP	7.6	13.1	9.0	11.4	9.6	5.9	1.3	1.9	1.2
DLV					6.4	3.5	0.1		
DNVP	4.1	6.9	15.4	20.8	10.5	8.0	8.4	12.1	11.3
Nazi			8.6	4.4	2.6	20.6	49.5	42.9	54.3
Other	0.0		2.7	0.5	8.3	6.4	1.0	0.9	0.0
Turnout	88.8	82.5	80.3	79.3	76.8	81.4	84.3	82.1	89.5
Source: Wahlen in Deutschland

=== Deputies ===
Election	Distribution	Seats
1920		7
May 1924		6
Dec 1924		6
1928		8
1930		6
Jul 1932		10
Nov 1932		9
1933		9
Source: Wahlen in Deutschland
