= Gau Eastern Hanover =

Regional district of the Nazi party

- Gau of Nazi Germany
- 1928–1945
- Flag Coat of arms

- Map of Nazi Germany showing its administrative subdivisions (Gaue and Reichsgaue).
- Capital: Lüneburg
- Government
- Gauleiter
  - 1928–1945: Otto Telschow
- History
  - Establishment: 1 October 1928
  - Disestablishment: 8 May 1945
Preceded by	Succeeded by
Free State of Prussia (1933-1935)	State of Hanover; Mecklenburg-Vorpommern
- Today part of: Germany

Gau Eastern Hanover (German: Ost-Hannover) was a regional district of the NSDAP established in 1925 in the north eastern part of the Prussian Province of Hanover, comprising the governorates of Stade and Lüneburg in their then boundaries. Originally called Gau Stade-Lüneburg, it was renamed Gau Ost-Hannover on 1 October 1928. Initially, the Gau was a mere regional Nazi party subsection, but with the growing subjection of all public administration to Nazi party influence after the Machtergreifung, the Gau usurped from 1933 to 1935 more and more the functions of the Provincial government and its superordinate Free State of Prussia. However, after the German constituent states were de facto abolished in 1935, the Gaue replaced them in their responsibilities. Gau East Hannover - like all Nazi party structures - was dismantled after Nazi Germany's defeat in 1945. In 1946 the Control Commission for Germany - British Element (CCG/BE) reconstituted the Province of Hanover as the State of Hanover and later the same year it merged with three smaller neighbouring reconstituted German states to form the new state of Lower Saxony within the British Zone of Occupation. The municipality of Amt Neuhaus was allocated to Mecklenburg-Vorpommern but later returned to Lower Saxony in 1993.

== History ==
The Nazi Gau (plural Gaue) system was originally established in a party conference on 22 May 1926, in order to improve administration of the party structure. From 1933 onward, after the Nazi seizure of power, the Gaue increasingly replaced the German states as administrative subdivisions in Germany.

At the head of each Gau stood a Gauleiter, a position which became increasingly more powerful, especially after the outbreak of the Second World War, with little interference from above. Local Gauleiters often held government positions as well as party ones and were in charge of, among other things, propaganda and surveillance and, from September 1944 onward, the Volkssturm and the defense of the Gau.

The position of Gauleiter in East Hanover was held by Otto Telschow for the duration of the existence of the Gau.

The Bergen-Belsen concentration camp was located in the Gau Eastern Hanover. The camp was liberated by the British Army in April 1945 who found the remaining 60,000 inmates in a state of starvation and near-death while the camp was littered with unburied bodies of dead inmates.
