= Hümmling (district) =

Hümmling district existed 1815 to 1932 and was a district in what is now western Lower Saxony, Germany. It was named after the Hümmling hills, a ground moraine landscape in Emsland region

== History ==
There are over 100 more or less well-preserved dolmens of the megalith culture in the Hümmling hills.

=== Niederstift Münster ===
Until 1803, in times of the Holy Roman Empire, Hümmling region was the northern part of the diocese and clerical territory of Münster (Niederstift Münster). When Clement Augustus, prince-bishop of Münster tried to use their soccage in order to build his castle at Clemenswerth, the peasants of the "Free Hümmling" fought a log successful trial at the Imperial Chamber Court in Wetzlar that they were not enfeoffed to anyone.

=== Napoleon, Hanover, Prussia ===
With the secularisation of all clerical states in Germany, the Niederstift Münster was given to the Duchy of Arenberg (1803 to 1810). Then it was part of the French Empire (1810 to 1814).

By the Congress of Vienna the former Niederstift Münster was given to the Kingdom of Hanover in 1814. The Hanoveran administration created a district of Hümmling, called Amt of Hümmling. The capital of that district was Sögel.

In 1866, after the German War, Prussia annected the Kingdom of Hanover, and the district of Hümmling was called Landkreis Hümmling. Prussian rule was very unpopular. Emsland with the Hümmling was a stronghold of the Roman Catholic Centre Party and of the Welfenpartei (German-Hanoverian Party).

In 1932, Hümmling district was united with the district of Aschendorf to form the district of Aschendorf-Hümmling

In 1946, Prussia was dissolved, and hence its Province of Hanover, together with the States of Oldenburg, Brunswick, and Schaumburg-Lippe were united to form the State of Hanover later to become the state of Lower Saxony. In 1977, all Lower Saxon parts of Emsland Region were united into the district of Emsland.

== Religion ==
The Hümmling is 93% Roman-Catholic. After the Second World War there was a large number of refugees from the old eastern provinces of Germany and, since 1990 there have also been ethnic German immigrants from the former Soviet Union in the Hümmling who, in addition to the Catholic faith, also belong to the New Apostolic Church and other Protestant faiths (Pentecostals, Baptists).

== Culture ==
A typical Hümmling speciality is the Baukweiten Janhinnerk, a pancake made of buckwheat flour with syrup, apple sauce, cranberries, egg, cheese, bread or rye bread.

The 'national anthem' of the Hümmlings is the Hümmelske Bur, a song, which typecasts the characteristics of the local population.

There is still a local dialect, the Hümmlinger Platt, which belongs to the Northern Low Saxon group of West Low German dialects. Not until about 1975 were generations born that grew up speaking High German.

The Hüven Mill is a technological attraction in the Hümmling. It is the last fully preserved combined wind- and watermill in Europe.

== Sources ==
- Matthias Bähr, Widerstand vor dem Reichskammergericht: Als die "freien Hümmlinger" nach Wetzlar zogen (1739-1768), in: Emsländische Geschichte Bd. 15. Hrsg. von der Studiengesellschaft für Emsländische Regionalgeschichte, Haselünne 2008, ISBN 3-9808021-6-7, S. 468-577
- Wilhelm Ludwig Heermann: Unser Hümmling, unsere Heimat. Gedichte und Erzählungen aus alten Zeiten. Goldschmidt, Werlte 2002, ISBN 3-927099-79-1
- Werner Franke et al.: Der Hümmling mit Sögel, Werlte und Nordhümmling. Reihe Landschaften im Emsland. Emsländischer Heimatbund, Sögel 1995, ISBN 3-88077-077-8
- Autorenkollektiv: Der Hümmling. Ein Heimatbuch. Herausgegeben vom Katholischen Kreislehrerverein des Kreises Hümmling. (Fotomechanischer Nachdruck der Ausgabe von 1929.) Goldschmidt, Werlte 1979
- Holger Lemmermann: Auf dem freien Hümmling. Ländliches Leben in vier Jahrhunderten (1530-1870). 2. Auflage. Emsländischer Heimatbund, Sögel 1995, ISBN 3-88077-126-X
- Lothar Riedel: Die Hümmlinger Kreisbahn. Die Verkehrsgeschichte der schmalspurigen Kleinbahn Lathen-Sögel-Werlte. Röhr, Krefeld 1983, ISBN 3-88490-138-9
