= Mainlinie =

Historical boundary between north and south Germany

Germany around 1866-1871. The red line marks the southern border of the Northern German states.

The Mainlinie (German for "Main-line") refers to the historical and political boundary between northern and southern Germany along the River Main. The line delimitates the spheres of influence of Austria and Prussia in the German Confederation during the 19th century. The seat of the German Confederation, Frankfurt am Main, sat upon the line.

== Geography ==
Eventually, the Main line became the southern boundary of the North German Confederation. As such, the Main line did not follow the Main River exactly. Rather, the line went east to west: firstly, along the northern border of the Kingdom of Bavaria; then, along the river Main to Mainz; and finally, along the western border of the Grand Duchy of Hesse and the Bavarian Palatinate towards the French border. The line split Hesse at Frankfurt am Main, but all of Frankfurt am Main belonged to the North German Confederation. Today, the Main line is viewed as the boundary between northern and southern Germany. Both regions have distinct linguistic and cultural differences.
