= Stade (region) =

German district (1823–1978)

High-Bailiwick of Stade (1823–1885) Governorate of Stade (1885–1978) Landdrostei Stade (1823–1885) Regierungsbezirk Stade (1885–1978) also Bezirk Stade
- Region of the Kingdom of Hanover (1823–1866) the Kingdom of Prussia (1866–1918) the Free State of Prussia (1918-1946/1947); Lower Saxony (1946–1978)
- 1823–1978
- Capital: Stade
- Area
  - 1823: 7,025 km^{2} (2,712 sq mi)
  - 1890: 6,786 km^{2} (2,620 sq mi)
  - 1969: 6,850 km^{2} (2,640 sq mi)
- Population
  - 1823: 208,251
  - 1890: 338,225
  - 1939: 462,592
  - 1969: 627,000
- Government
  - Type: regional administration
- High-Bailiff (German: Landdrost, 1823–1885), Governor (Regierungspräsident, 1885–1978)
  - 1823–1841: Engelbert Johann Marschalck
  - 1863–1872: August Theodor Braun
  - 1922–1933: Hermann Rose
  - 1950–1954: Walter Harm
  - 1958–1959: Curt Miehe
  - 1959–1973: Helmut-Ernst Miericke
- Legislature: no autonomous legislation, power only deriving from the state government
- Historical era: 19th and 20th century
  - real union of Bremen- Verden with Hanover: 1823
  - annexed by Prussia: 20 September 1866
  - reorganisation acc. to Prussian standards: 1 April 1885
  - governor dismissed by Gauleiter O. Telschow: Nazi control intensified; by subjection to Nazi Gau Eastern Hanover: 1933 1935
  - U.S. (partially until 1947) and British occupation: 1945–1949
  - part of Lower Saxony since its foundation, entailed by the official abolition of Prussia on: 1/22 November 1946 25 February 1947
  - merged into the Lunenburg Region: 31 January 1978
- Political subdivisions: bailiwicks (Amt/Ämter, sg./pl., 1823–1885), thereafter rural districts (Landkreis[e], sg.[pl.]) and urban districts (Geestemünde 1913–24, Lehe 1913–24, Wesermünde 1924–47, Cuxhaven 1937–77)
| Preceded by | Succeeded by |
| Bremen-Verden | Lüneburg (region) / Image missing |
- Today part of: Germany

The Stade Region emerged in 1823 by an administrative reorganisation of the dominions of the Kingdom of Hanover, a sovereign state, whose then territory is almost completely part of today's German federal state of Lower Saxony. Until 1837 the Kingdom of Hanover was ruled in personal union by the Kings of the United Kingdom of Great Britain and Ireland.

The official title of the Region was High-Bailiwick of Stade (1823–1885; German: Landdrostei Stade) and then Governorate of Stade (1885–1978; German: Regierungsbezirk Stade). The High-Bailiwick of Stade, being a mere administrative unit of the integrated Kingdom of Hanover, was named after and seated in Stade, Bremen-Verden's former capital, taking over its staff, installations and buildings. The territory of the Stade Region was combined by the territories of the Land of Hadeln, the Duchies of Bremen and Verden (German pronunciation: [ˈfɛːɐ̯dən]), all Hanoverian dominions, which were collectively administered. The territory belonging to the Stade Region covered about the triangular area between the mouths of the rivers Elbe and Weser to the North Sea and today's German federal states of Hamburg and Bremen. This area included about today's Lower Saxon counties (German: Landkreis or Kreis) of Cuxhaven (southernly), Osterholz, Rotenburg upon Wümme, Stade and Verden as well as of the Bremian exclave of the city of Bremerhaven.

== History ==
=== Before the establishment of the High-Bailiwick of Stade ===
The collectively administered Land of Hadeln, the Duchy of Bremen and the Duchy of Verden were therefore colloquially referred to as the Duchies of Bremen-Verden or simply Bremen-Verden. The latter two emerged in 1648 by the transformation of the Prince-Archbishopric of Bremen, then Duchy of Bremen, and the Prince-Bishopric of Verden, then Duchy of Verden.

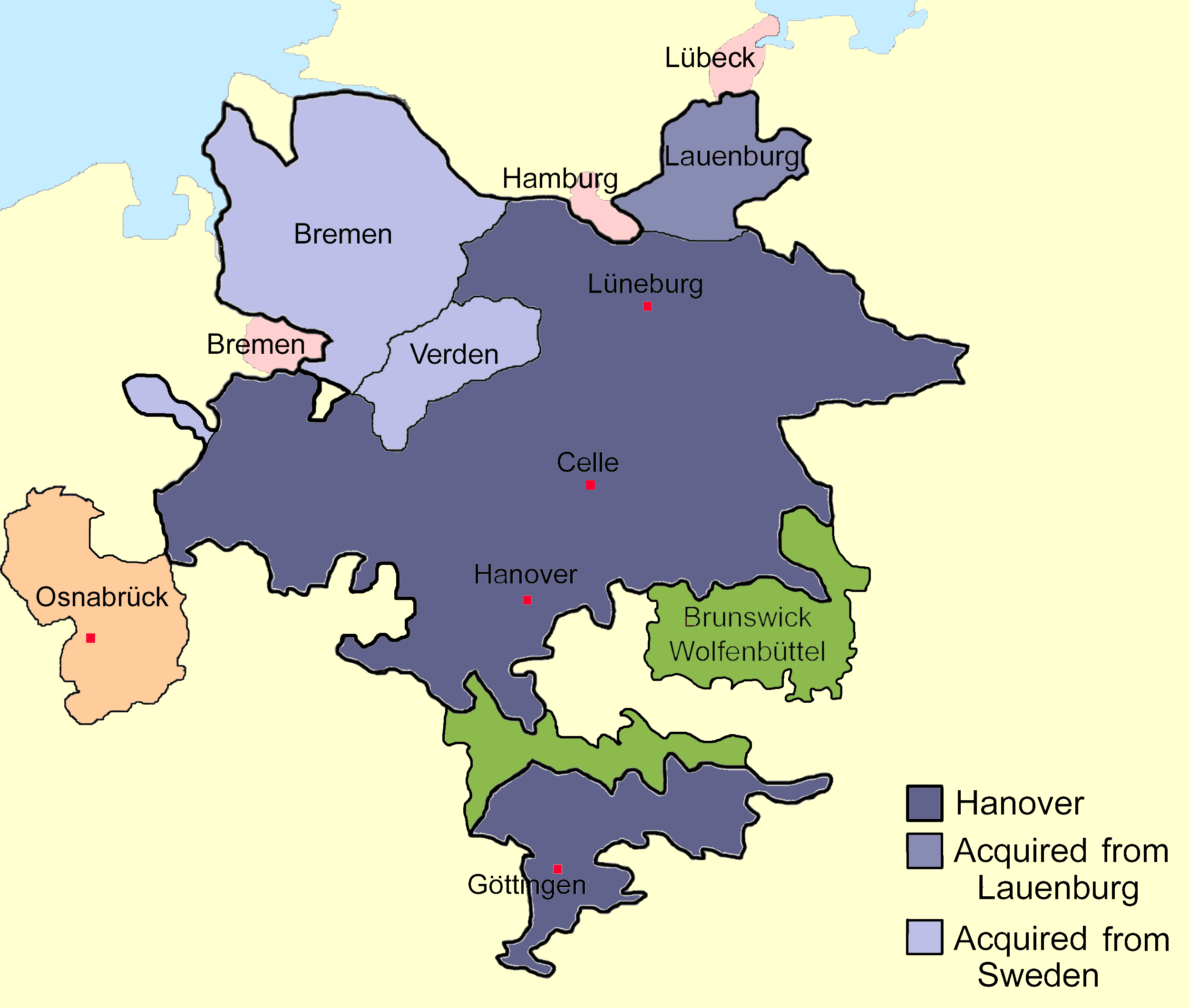
Sketch map of the Electorate of Brunswick and Lunenburg (alias Electorate of Hanover), c.1720, and its neighbouring territories such as the Principality of Brunswick and Lunenburg-Wolfenbüttel (alias Brunswick-Wolfenbüttel), and the Prince-Bishopric of Osnabrück. George I Louis acquired Saxe-Lauenburg and Bremen-Verden for his electorate.

The Kingdom of Hanover's predecessor the Prince-Electorate of Brunswick and Lunenburg (or, colloquially called after its capital Electorate of Hanover; German: Kurfürstentum Braunschweig und Lüneburg, or Kurhannover) purchased Bremen-Verden from its Danish occupants de facto in 1715 (and again from its legitimate owner Sweden in 1719 (Treaty of Stockholm) for rixdollars [Rtlr] 1 million). De jure this acquisition had to be legitimised by imperial feoffment. It took Elector George II Augustus until 1733 to get Charles VI to enfeoff him with the Duchy of Bremen and Verden.

In 1728 Emperor Charles VI enfeoffed Elector George II Augustus, who in 1727 had succeeded his father George I Louis, with the reverted fief of Saxe-Lauenburg. By a redeployment of Hanoverian territories in 1731 Bremen-Verden was conveyed the administration of the neighboured Land of Hadeln (at the Northern tip of Bremen-Verden), since 1180 an exclave, first of the younger Duchy of Saxony, from 1296 on of the Duchy of Saxe-Lauenburg, one of the former's successors.

At both feoffments George II Augustus swore that he would respect the existing privileges and constitutions of the Estates of Bremen-Verden and of Hadeln, thus confirming 400-year-old traditions of Estate participation in government. The small Land of Hadeln maintained until 1885 as to its legislation a certain level of internal autonomy (Estates of Hadeln) but as to the executive power Hadeln was administered by neighboured Bremen-Verden's provincial government.

Being a Prince-Elector of the Holy Roman Empire and represented in its Diet by virtue of his Electorate of Hanover, George II Augustus didn't bother about Bremen-Verden's status of Imperial immediacy. Since Bremen-Verden had turned Hanoverian it never again sent its own representatives to a Diet .

=== The Stade Region as part of the state of Hanover in the years from 1813 to 1866 ===
After the Napoleonic Wars, which brought changing occupations and annexations of the Duchies of Bremen and Verden (for more details see Bremen-Verden), Bremen-Verden was restored in 1813 to the Electorate of Hanover, which transformed into the Kingdom of Hanover in 1814. Even though Bremen-Verden's status as a territory of imperial immediacy had become void with the end of the Holy Roman Empire in 1806, the Duchies were not right away incorporated in real union into the Hanoverian state. Since the Hanoverian monarchs had moved to London, Hanover had become a state of very conservative and backwarded rule, with a local government recruited from local aristocrats adding up much to the preservation of outdated structures.

The real union with Hanover only followed in 1823, when an administrative reform united Bremen-Verden and Hadeln to form the High-Bailiwick of Stade, administered according to unitarian modern standards, thereby doing away with various traditional Bremian government forms. Hadeln kept part of its traditional autonomy until 1852, its Estates continued to function with restricted authority until 1884. In 1823 the high-bailiwick consisted of 7,025 square kilometres with 208,251 inhabitants.

On 1 May 1827 a small section of the lower Weser shore in the West of the High-Bailiwick of Stade, forming the nucleus of the future city of Bremerhaven, was transferred to the Free Hanseatic City of Bremen, as agreed upon earlier that year in a contract by the Hanoveran minister Friedrich Franz Dieterich von Bremer and Bremen's Burgomaster Johann Smidt. Bremerhaven (literally English: Bremian Harbour) was founded to be a haven for Bremen's merchant marine, with that city located upstream the Weser being more and more disconnected from the sea, due to that river's silting up. Bremerhaven also became the home port of the German Confederation's Navy under Karl Rudolf Brommy.

=== Reorganisation of religious bodies in the Stade region ===
Two Lutheran consistories, one for the Land of Hadeln in Otterndorf (founded by Hadeln's Estates in 1535, integrated into Stade's consistory in 1885) and one in Stade (founded by Swedish Bremen-Verden's government in 1650) for the rest of the High-Bailiwick supervised the Lutheran cult and clergy. A general superintendent chaired each consistory. Lutherans made up by far the majority of the population. Among Lutherans revivalism played a major role in the 1850s. In 1848 the Lutheran parishes were democratised by the introduction of presbyteries (parish councils), elected by all major male parishioners and chairing each parish in co-operation with the pastor, being before the sole chairman. This introduction of presbyteries was somewhat revolutionary in the rather hierarchically structured Lutheran church.

The Lutheran church was the state church of the Kingdom of Hanover with the king being summus episcopus (Supreme Governor of the Lutheran Church). In 1864 Carl Lichtenberg, Hanoverian minister of education, cultural and religious affairs (1862–1865), persuaded the Hanoverian parliament to pass a new law as to the constitution of the Lutheran church. The constitution provided a state synod (parishioners' parliament, German: Landessynode). But its first session only materialised in 1869, when after the Prussian annexation of the Kingdom of Hanover (1866) the Hanoverian Lutherans desired a representative body separate from Prussian rule, though it was restricted to Lutheran matters only.

After the Prussian conquest in 1866, on 19 September 1866, the day before the official Prussian annexation took place and with the last king, George V of Hanover, in exile, the Kingdom's six consistories joined to form the still existing Lutheran State Church of Hanover. An all-Hanoverian consistory, the Landeskonsistorium (state consistory), was formed with representatives from the regional consistories. The Lutheran state church became a stronghold of Hanoverian separatism and therefore somewhat politicised. It opposed the Evangelical State Church in Prussia, comprising the Protestant parishes in the Prussian territory prior the 1866 annexations, not only for its being a stronghold of Prussian patriotism, but for being a united church of formerly Lutheran and Calvinist parishes, with a preponderance of Calvinism because the Calvinist Hohenzollern dynasty wielded its influence in the unification of Lutherans and Calvinists in then Prussia in 1817. The Hanoverian Lutherans managed to maintain their independence and the Evangelical State Church in Prussia stayed abreast of the changes and renamed in 1875 into Evangelical State Church of Prussia's older Provinces.

The Calvinist communities were in a somewhat sorry state. They emerged in the 1590s, when the Calvinist city of Bremen actually possessed some area around Bederkesa and Lehe (a part of today's Bremerhaven) at the lower Weser stream. In 1654, after the First Bremian War, the city ceded the area to Swedish Bremen-Verden, which subjected the Calvinists there to supervision by the Lutheran consistory. Under Lutheran pressure only six congregations stood fast to Calvinism. In the municipalities, where they were located, Calvinists made up the majority of the population, later Lutheran migration outweighed the Calvinist preponderance. The rest of the Stade Region was and is a Calvinist diaspora.

In 1848 Hanoverian law also provided for presbyteries in the Calvinist parishes in the Stade Region, which exactly fit the presbyterian structure of Calvinism. But only in 1882 – long after the Prussian annexation of Hanover – the inappropriate supervision by Lutheran consistorials ended, when King William I of Prussia decreed the creation of the Evangelical Reformed Church of the Province of Hanover comprising all the Calvinist communities in the prevailingly Lutheran Province of Hanover. The simultaneously Lutheran and Calvinist consistory in Aurich was made the consistory of that church body, becoming an exclusively Calvinist body only in 1922, following the constitutional reorganisation of the church bodies after the Weimar Constitution had decreed the separation of church and state in 1919.

After the forcefully wielded attempts of reCatholicisation in 1628–1632, which ended with the reconquest by the legitimate Lutheran Administrator regnant of the Prince-Archbishopric of Bremen, John Frederick, no Catholic communities existed and missionary and pastoral activities were supervised by the Roman Catholic Vicariate Apostolic of the Nordic Missions, but widely hindered by Bremen-Verden's government. By annexations after the Napoléonic Wars, the Kingdom of Hanover had become a state of three Christian denominations. In 1824 Hanover and the Holy See thus agreed upon to integrate the territory comprising the Stade Region into the neighboured Roman Catholic Diocese of Hildesheim, with the Vicariate Apostolic's competence ending there. In 1859 (in Blumenthal, 170 Catholics) and in 1872 (in Verden upon Aller) the first Catholic parishes were founded (after 1632), with all the Stade Region being a Catholic diaspora.

Jews left scarce archival traces in the mediaeval Prince-Archbishopric of Bremen. In 1611 the city of Stade signed a contract with Sephardic Jews, allowing the foundation of a community. In 1613 Administrator John Frederick followed by settling Ashkenazzi Jews in the city, but during the turmoil of Catholic conquest and Lutheran reconquest the last archival traces of Jews date from 1630. Only by the end of the 17th century Jews reappear in Bremen-Verden. At the beginning of the 19th century some 30 Jewish families lived dispersedly over the region, under precarious legal status, and without Jewish institutions. By the Westphalian and French annexations in 1807 and 1810 the Jews in the Stade Region had been emancipated and thus naturalised, only to lose their French citizenship again by France's defeat in 1813, falling back into a status of toleration or mere indigenousness without political rights in restituted Bremen-Verden.

In 1842 the Kingdom of Hanover granted equal rights to Jews and promoted to build up Jewish communities and a regional superstructure (Rabbinate) within a nationwide scope. The Jews in the Stade Region regarded this a progress and a burden alike, because prior they hadn't employed any rabbi and religion teacher, opened hardly a synagogue or school due to the implied financial burden. In 1845 – according to the new law – a land-rabbinate for the whole Stade Region, under land-rabbi Joseph Heilbut, was established, serving 16 Jewish communities, which were founded over the years, with altogether 1,250 Jews in 1864 (highest number ever reached). The local authorities now requested, that the Jewish communities establish synagogues and Jewish education for the pupils. Synagogues existed in Neuhaus upon Oste and in Osten (both early 19th century), in Horneburg (opened 1831) and in Stade (opened 1849, closed due to financial restrictions in 1908). And a teacher for Jewish religion and Hebrew was employed (after 1890 Stade's community couldn't afford a teacher any more). From 1903 on the Jewish community of Stade was granted public subsidies to continue functioning. The land-rabbins simultaneously fulfilled religious and state functions, like supervising Jewish elementary schools and the teaching of Jewish religion in all schools. The Kingdom of Hanover was thus one of the few states within the German Confederation, where rabbis held a similar semi-state authoritative position as to Jews as did, e.g., Lutheran clergy towards Lutherans.

After the Prussian annexation the constitution of Hanover's four land-rabbinates came under threat to be abolished, because in Prussia proper the government hindered as much as possible the establishment of nationwide Jewish organisations, let alone such which it would grant official recognition. In the end Prussia respected the existing Hanoverian land-rabbinate constitution, which continued to exist – modified according to the separation of state and religion in 1919 by the Weimar constitution – until the Nazi Reich's government de facto abolished the constitution in 1938. The communities in urban Lehe (28 families, after 1924 part of Wesermünde: 300 community members in 1928), Scharmbeck (20 families) and Verden upon Aller were the biggest by membership, while rural communities vanished. The Stade Region stayed a Jewish diaspora, and from 1860 on Stade's land-rabbinate was never staffed again, but served alternately by one of the other three Hanoverian land-rabbinates. Labour migration and emigration to urban centres outside the Stade Region and Jewish demography rather lead to a reduction of the number of Jews in the Stade Region (786 in 1913, 716 in 1928).

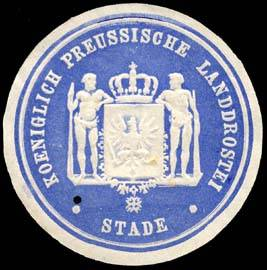
Sealing stamp of the Stade Region, years from 1866 to 1885

=== The Stade Region as an administrative unit of Prussia (1866-1945/1947) ===
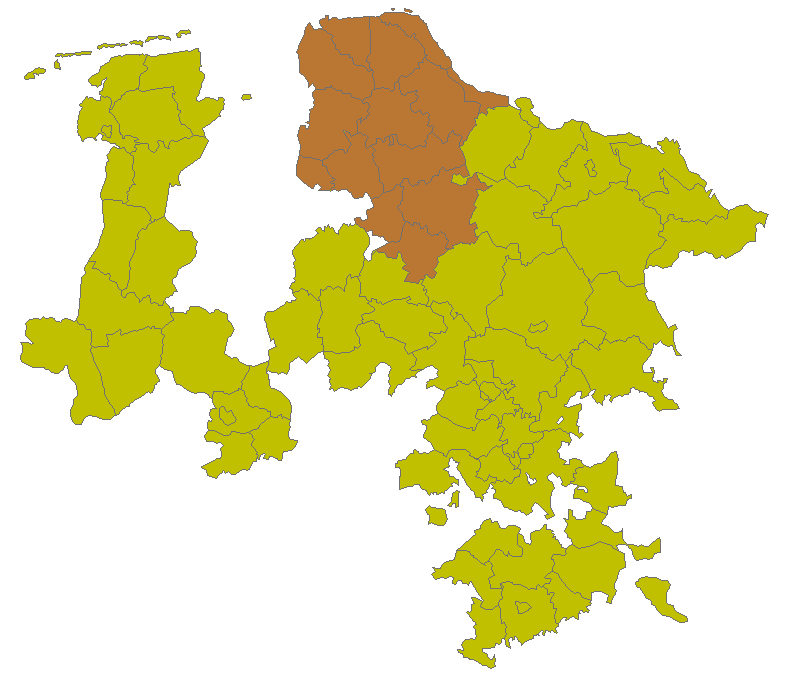
The Stade Region (brown), consisting of 14 counties within the Prussian Province of Hanover (beige), in 1905.

After the Prussian annexation of the Kingdom of Hanover in 1866, the kingdom was transformed into the Prussian Province of Hanover. The adaptation to other Prussian administrative structures took only place in 1885, when the high-bailiwick was redesigned according to Prussian law as the Governorate of Stade (German: Regierungsbezirk Stade). The Hanoverian subsections of a high-bailiwick (German: Amt, plural: Ämter), were redeployed into 14 bigger Prussian style counties (German: Kreis, plural: Kreise). At the time of its redeployment the high-bailiwick's population amounted to 300,000. In 1905 the population amounted to 403,302 with an area of 6,786 square kilometres (2,620 sq mi), which made up a density of 59 persons per square kilometre. The Governorate of Stade weathered the following wars and constitutional changes.

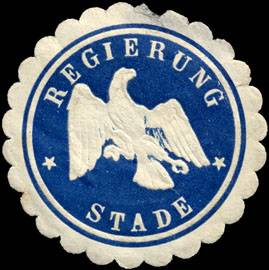
Sealing stamp of the Stade Region, Weimar period

Bremerhaven was several times enlarged at the expense of the Governorate of Stade´s territory. But on the latter's territory several suburbs grew and in 1924 were united to form the urban county of Wesermünde. In 1932 by an administrative reform the number of the governorate's 13 rural counties was reduced to a mere seven. In 1932 in the Great Depression the Lutheran Church of the State of Hanover opened a camp for formerly workless singles, employed in public works (roadworks, amelioration) in Sandbostel.

In 1933 the Nazis seized the power in Germany (Machtergreifung). On the Reich's and the level of the states gradually all resistance was decapitated. Anti-Semitic discriminations were imposed onto Jewish Germans and Germans of Jewish descent. In 1932 Franz von Papen's Reich's government had overthrown the last democratic Prussian government under Otto Braun (Prussian Coup). So the Governorate of Stade, being a part of the Free State of Prussia, one of the most stable and democratised German states, came fast under Nazi influence. The governor Hermann Rose resigned under pressure of Gauleiter Otto Telschow. The Nazis' rule enforcement was characterised by installing Nazi-loyal parallel structures, which would interfere with existing public administration and bring it to dictatorial lines. The Governorate of Stade came under ever increasing interference of the Nazi party's regional subsection Gau Eastern Hanover under Gauleiter Otto Telschow, especially after 1935, when the Nazi-party Gaue replaced the functions of the streamlined German states.

The new Nazi Reich's government – "provisionally" ruling Prussia – had direct rule over the Prussian police, with police being an institution of the respective German states. The ordinary police had to guard together with S.A. men, the Prussian Criminal Police Department in charge for the Governorate of Stade was seated in its biggest city Wesermünde. In March/April 1933 the Criminal Police was transformed into the new Wesermünde Department of the State Police, directly subordinated to the new Geheime Staatspolizei (GeStapo, secret state police), circumventing all prior existing Prussian administrative structures, to which the former Criminal Police had been subjected and reporting before. At first Wesermünde's Stapo Department persecuted all political enemies of Nazism and later persons involved in all kinds of disobediences, such as strikes, absenteeism, black marketing, circumventions of ordered dues to be delivered, which all became an ever-growing phenomenon with the increasing weariness in the long duration of the war. The Stapo had its special eye on forced labourers in the governorate, abducted from all over German occupied Europe.

In 1939 the Sandbostel camp, meanwhile usurped by the Nazi trade union Reichsarbeitsdienst, was converted into the prisoner-of-war camp Stalag X-B and a camp of internment for civilian enemy aliens. Until 1945 about a million inmates passed through the camp, with about 46,000 perished.

As to territorial changes the Reich's Nazi government decreed by the Greater Hamburg Act (1937) to incorporate the Hamburgian exclave of Cuxhaven into the Governorate of Stade, forming then an urban county. While at the most eastern end of the governorate some municipalities were integrated into the state of Hamburg. Two years later the Reich's Nazi government decreed to incorporate some municipalities of the counties of Osterholz and Verden into the city of Bremen and in return to disentangle Bremerhaven from the Free Hanseatic City of Bremen and to incorporate it into Wesermünde. But that redeployment didn't last long.

=== The Governorate of Stade as part of the British and U.S. Zone of Occupation (1945–1949) ===
From 1945 on the occupational U.S. forces in defeated Germany used the harbours of Bremen and Wesermünde as their Port of Embarkation. Being actually located in the British Zone of Occupation the Control Commission for Germany - British Element and the Office of Military Government for Germany, U.S. (OMGUS) agreed in 1947 to constitute the cities of Bremen and Wesermünde as a German state named Free Hanseatic City of Bremen, becoming at that occasion an exclave of the American Zone of Occupation within the British zone. Radio AFN (American Forces Network), based in rechristened Bremerhaven, became popular for its transmissions of jazz and rock music.

After this territorial toing and froing the Governorate of Stade belonged to Lower Saxony, the state newly founded in 1946 by the Control Commission for Germany – British Element (Cf. Ordinance No. 46), even before in 1947 the Allies officially dissolved the Free State of Prussia.

=== The Governorate of Stade as an administrative unit of the state of Lower Saxony (1946–1978) ===
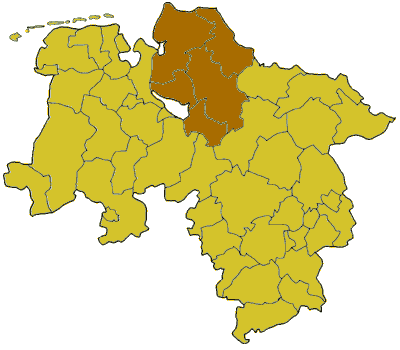
The Governorate of Stade (in brown), consisting of 5 counties (German: Kreise, plural) within the German state of Lower Saxony (in beige), in 1977.

From 1973 to 1977 the number of Lower Saxon counties has been reduced by uniting counties. The urban county of Cuxhaven and the neighboured counties of the Land of Hadeln and Wesermünde were united to form the new County of Cuxhaven. The county of Bremervörde was integrated into the County of Rotenburg upon Wümme. Thus the governorate consisted only of a mere five counties: Cuxhaven, Osterholz, Rotenburg (Wümme), Stade and Verden. In 1977 the governorate's population amounted to almost 700,000.

The Governorate of Stade continued to exist until 31 January 1978. The next day it was incorporated into the neighbouring Governorate of Lunenburg (German: Regierungsbezirk Lüneburg), with the complete dissolution of all Lower Saxon governorates following in 2004.

Today no single administrative entity covers the territory of the former Bremen-Verden. Today's efforts and activities in the field of culture in the region are covered by the Landschaftsverband der ehemaligen Herzogtümer Bremen und Verden (Engl. about: landscape union of the former duchies of Bremen and Verden, or short Landschaftsverband Stade).

== List of High-Bailiffs and Governors ==
Bearing the title: High-Bailiff (German: Landdrost, plural: Landdroste)

- 1823–41 Engelbert Johann Marschalck (1766–1845), Bremen-Verden's Estates elected him the last president of the provisional government (1813–1823) after the French retreat. In 1823 he became the first High-Bailiff of the Stade Region, the merely administrative entity succeeding Bremen-Verden's dissolution in 1823.
- 1841–55 Freiherr Ernst von Bülow (1801–1861), father of the later Prussian general Ernst von Bülow
- 1856–58 Freiherr Otto Alexander Marschalck (1798–1858), also Royal Hanoverian High-Bailiff in Osnabrück
- 1858–62 Friedrich Wilhelm Heise (died 23 November 1862), Geheimer Rat (privy councillor)
- 1863–72 August Theodor Braun (1802–1887), 1848–1850 minister for education, cultural and religious affairs of the Kingdom of Hanover
- 1872–85 Heinrich Küster

Bearing the title: Governor (German: Regierungspräsident, plural: Regierungspräsidenten)

- 1885–88 Ludwig Eberhard Franzius
- 1888–95 Dr. Gustav Heyer
- 1895–99 Dr. Edgar Himly
- 1899–1909 Freiherr Rudolf von Reiswitz und Kaderzin
- 1909–11 Graf Kurd von Berg-Schönfeld
- 1911–22 Hans Grashoff
- 1922–33 Dr. Hermann Rose (1879–1943), member of the Prussian House of Commons (1921–1932) for the DVP, forced to resign as governor by Gauleiter Otto Telschow
- 1933–36 Albert Leister (1890–1968), member of the Reichstag (1930–1933) for the NSDAP
- 1936–44 Arthur Schmidt-Kügler
- 1944–45 Hermann Fiebing
- 1945 Dr. Oskar Brenken provisional
- November 1945–49 Johann Thies (1898–1969), member of the Bundestag (1956–57) for the CDU
- 1949–50 Dr. Werner Pollack (1886–1979), only per pro as Regierungsvizepräsident
- 1950 Dr. Friedrich Knost (1899–1982), provisional
- 1950–54 Dr. Walter Harm (1897–1964), member of the Bundestag (1957–1964) for the SPD
- 1954–58 Dr. Otto Wendt, member or the Lower Saxon Parliament (1959) for the GB/BHE
- 1958–59 Dr. Curt Miehe (1903–1965), provisional, Lower Saxon Minister for Federal Affairs, Expellees and Refugees (1964–1965) in the second and third cabinet of Minister-President Georg Diederichs (SPD)
- 1959–73 Helmut-Ernst Miericke (1914–1973)
- 1973–78 Joachim Passow (1925–1983), only per pro as Regierungsvizepräsident

== Vital Statistics 1890–1980 ==
| County | Population 1890 | Population 1900 | Population 1910 | Population 1925 | Population 1933 | Population 1939 | Population 1969 | Population 1980 |
|---|---|---|---|---|---|---|---|---|
| Blumenthal | 22,547 | 30,353 | 39,535 | 43,104 | | | | |
| Osterholz | 28,232 | 29,205 | 31,284 | 32,545 | 80,216 | 41,529 | 80,600 | 93,700 |
| Achim | 20,981 | 24,051 | 28,555 | 33,717 | | | | |
| Verden | 25,125 | 26,392 | 27,638 | 28,177 | 63,441 | 51,643 | 88,900 | 110,300 |
| Zeven | 14,060 | 15,318 | 15,825 | 20,569 | | | | |
| Bremervörde | 17,040 | 18,159 | 19,858 | 22,305 | 44,021 | 45,455 | 72,700 | |
| Rotenburg upon Wümme | 19,642 | 21,128 | 25,425 | 29,171 | 30,947 | 33,821 | 57,100 | 138,400 |
| Geestemünde, rural county | 35,398 | 41,906 | 51,002 | 23,355 | | | | |
| Lehe, rural county | 32,165 | 43,040 | 58,685 | 23,736 | | | | |
| Wesermünde, rural county | | | | | 47,695 | 49,632 | 78,900 | |
| Wesermünde, urban county | | | | 72,065 | 77,461 | 86,043 | ceded to the state | of Bremen in 1947 |
| Neuhaus upon Oste | 29,111 | 29,684 | 29,383 | 27,020 | | | | |
| Hadeln | 16,652 | 15,959 | 16,662 | 16,921 | | | | |
| Land of Hadeln | | | | | 42,281 | 43,827 | 64,200 | |
| Cuxhaven, urban county | | | | | | 22,094 | 45,200 | |
| Cuxhaven, rural county | | | | | | | | 191,700 |
| Kehdingen | 21,014 | 19,993 | 19,741 | 19,146 | | | | |
| Jork (Altes Land) | 20,899 | 21,028 | 21,050 | 21,064 | | | | |
| Stade | 35,359 | 38,804 | 42,712 | 44,652 | 88,253 | 88,548 | 139,400 | 163,400 |
| Stade Region | 338,225 | 375,020 | 427,355 | 457,547 | 474,315 | 462,592 | 627,000 | 697,500 |

== Notable people from the Stade Region as from 1823 on ==
A list of interesting people whose birth, death, residence or activity took place in the Stade Region.

- Ludwig Alpers (1866–1959), teacher, politician, after Prussian annexation of the Kingdom of Hanover in 1866 member of the separatist German-Hanoverian Party
- Anita Augspurg (born in Verden upon Aller; 1857–1943), suffragette, women's rights fighter
- Johann(es) Gerhard Behrens (1889–1979), Lutheran pastor in Stade, in 1935 beaten up by a Nazi squad, scolding him 'serf of the Jews' (Judenknecht), astronomer (name-giver of the asteroid 1651 Behrens), member of the anti-Nazi Protestant Confessing Church
- Cato Bontjes van Beek (1920–1943), grew up in Fischerhude, ceramist, resistant fighter against Nazism, beheaded in Berlin-Plötzensee
- Heinrich Böse (1783–1867), Bremian, Danish and West Indian sugar manufacturer, politician, anti-Napoléonic freedom fighter
- Hans Heinrich Brockmann, (born in Altkloster, 1903–1988), chemist
- Karl Rudolf Brommy (born Bromme; 1804–1864), counter-admiral, navy-warrior in the independence wars of Brazil, Chile and Greece, founding organiser of the Greek Navy, supreme commander of the German Confederation's Reich's Navy in Bremerhaven (1849–1853)
- Adolf Butenandt (born and grown up in Lehe, since 1947 part of Bremerhaven; 1903–1995), biochemist, Nobel prize-winner of chemistry in 1939
- Louise Cooper (1849–1931), missionary, founder and leader of blind mission in Hildesheim
- Carl Diercke (1842–1913), geographer, cartographer, pedagogue, school councilor, founder of Diercke atlas series
- Wilhelm Heinrich Evers (1884–1960), aeronautical engineer and aircraft designer in the U.S. and Germany
- Jürgen Christian Findorff (1720–1792), carpenter, Moor Commissioner in charge of draining, reclaiming and settling moor lands in the Stade Region
- Carl Friedrich Gauß (1777–1855), mathematician and astronomer, carried out triangulation in the Stade Region
- August Karl von Goeben (1815–1880), general, sometimes disputed as Hanoverian treator, who served as commander in the Prussian army while the Prussian conquest of the Kingdom of Hanover in 1866
- Diederich Hahn (1859–1918), farmer, anti-Semitic and agricultural politician, member of Prussian House of Commons (1893–1912), member of the Reichstag (1903–1918)
- Baron Carl Iwan Bodo von Hodenberg (1826–1907), Hanoverian diplomat, minister for education, cultural and religious affairs of the Kingdom of Hanover (1865–1866), after Prussian annexation in 1866 leader of the separatist German-Hanoverian Party
- Bernhard Hoetger (1874–1949), sculpturist, architect, among others active in Worpswede
- August Heinrich Hoffmann von Fallersleben (1798–1874), poet (e.g., of today's German anthem), Germanist, as exiled illegally in the Stade Region
- Hinrich Wilhelm Kopf (born in Neuenkirchen in Hadeln; 1893–1961), lawyer, businessman, last county commissioner (Landrat) of the county of Hadeln (1928–1932), politician, last Upper President of the Prussian Province of Hanover (1945–1947), co-founder and first Prime Minister of the state of Lower Saxony (1947–1955, 1959–1961), Vice Prime Minister (1957–1959)
- Fritz Mackensen (1866–1953), painter, graphicker, sculpturist, novelist
- Otto Modersohn (1865–1943), painter
- Hermann Molkenbuhr (1851–1927), politician, member of the Reichstag (1890–1924), speaker of the SPD faction the Reichstag (1911–1918)
- Joachim Ringelnatz (1883–1934), marine in Cuxhaven, participating in September 1918 in the rebellion of 1918–1919, clerk, novelist, cabarettist
- Hermann Rose (1879–1943), lawyer, member of Prussian House of Commons (1921–1932), Regierungspräsident of Stade (1922–1933, forced to resign by Gauleiter Otto Telschow), author
- Walther von Seydlitz-Kurzbach (1888–1976), general, president of the anti-Hitlerist Federation of German Officers in Soviet prisonship-of-war (then integrated into the National Committee for a Free Germany), returned from Soviet prisonship-of-war in 1955 to Verden upon Aller
- Otto Telschow (1876–1945), member of the Reichstag (1930–1945), Nazi Gauleiter of East Hanover district of the Nazi party (1928–1945)
- Anton Christian Wedekind (1763–1845), administrator, jurist, historian
- Rudolf Welskopf (1902–1979), carpenter, resistance fighter against Nazism
