= Kingdom of Hanover =

19th-century state in the German Confederation

Coordinates: 52°22′0″N 9°43′0″E

Kingdom of Hanover Königreich Hannover (German)
- 1814–1866
- Top: Flag (1814–1837); Bottom: Flag (1837–1866) Coat of arms
- Motto: Suscipere et Finire "To Undertake and Finish"
- Anthem: Heil dir, Hannover "Hail to you, Hanover"
- The Kingdom of Hanover in 1815
- Status: State of the German Confederation, in personal union with the United Kingdom of Great Britain and Ireland (1814–1837)
- Capital: Hanover
- Common languages: German; West Low German
- Religion: Protestantism (mainly Lutheranism, but also Calvinism), Catholicism
- Government: Constitutional monarchy
- King
  - 1814–1820: George III
  - 1820–1830: George IV
  - 1830–1837: William IV
  - 1837–1851: Ernest Augustus
  - 1851–1866: George V
- Legislature: Assembly of the Kingdom of Hanover
- History
  - Congress of Vienna: 12 October 1814
  - German revolutions: 13 March 1848
  - Austro-Prussian War: 14 June 1866
  - Peace of Prague: 23 August 1866
  - Annexed by Prussia: 20 September 1866
- Currency: Hanoverian thaler (1814–1857); Hanoverian vereinsthaler (1857–1866)
Preceded by	Succeeded by
Electorate of Hanover; Kingdom of Westphalia	Province of Hanover
- Today part of: Germany; Netherlands

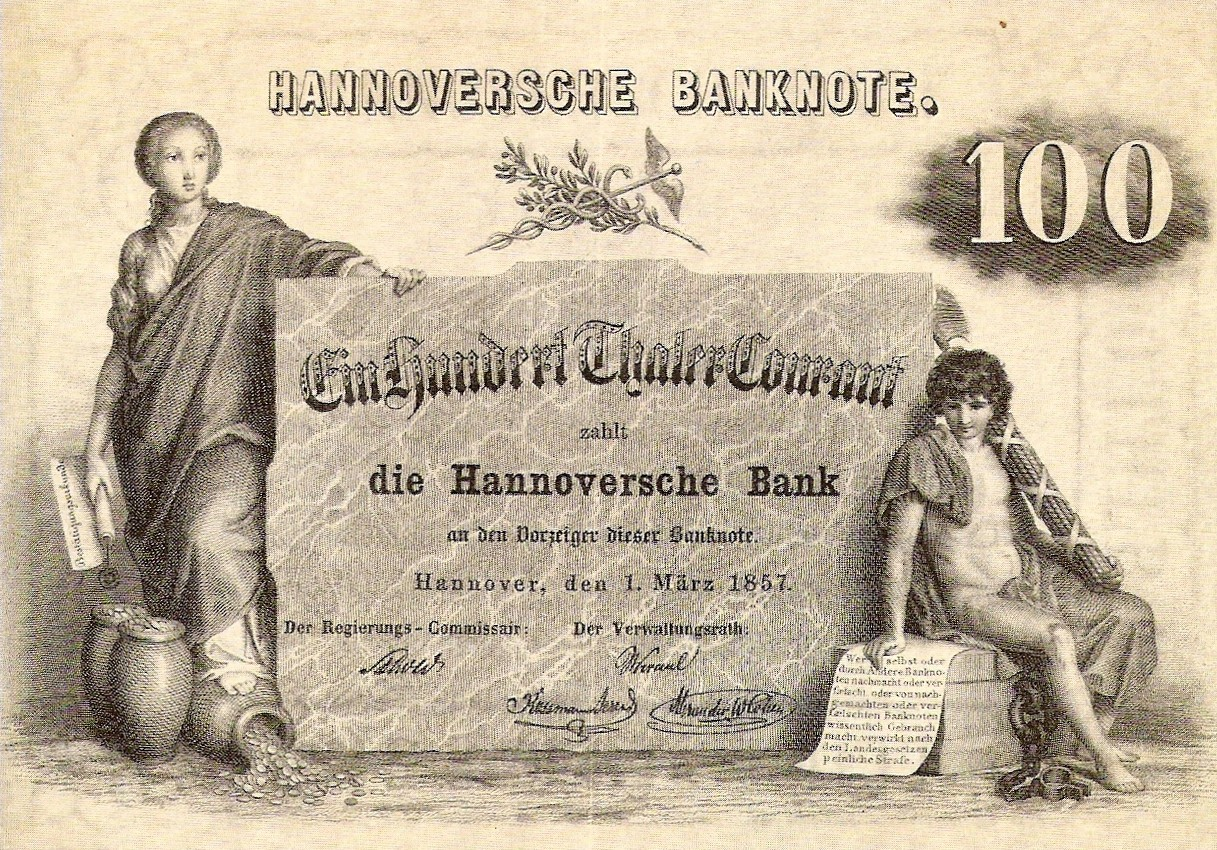
A 100 thaler banknote from 1857

The Kingdom of Hanover (German: Königreich Hannover) was established in October 1814 by the Congress of Vienna, with the restoration of George III to his Hanoverian territories after the Napoleonic era. Its capital was Hanover and it also ruled Gottingen and Osnabruck. It had access to the North Sea, and bordered on the Netherlands and the free German cities of Hamburg and Bremen. It succeeded the former Electorate of Hanover, and joined 38 other sovereign states in the German Confederation in June 1815.

The kingdom was ruled by the House of Hanover, a cadet branch of the House of Welf, in personal union with Great Britain between 1714 and 1837. Since its monarch resided in London, a viceroy, usually a younger member of the British royal family, handled the administration of the Kingdom of Hanover.

The personal union with the United Kingdom ended in 1837 upon the accession of Queen Victoria because semi-Salic law prevented females from inheriting the Hanoverian throne while a dynastic male was still alive. Her uncle Ernest Augustus thus became the ruler of Hanover. His only son succeeded him to the throne as George V. As he backed the losing side in the Austro-Prussian War, his kingdom was conquered by Prussia in 1866 and ceased to exist as an independent kingdom, becoming the Prussian Province of Hanover.

In January 1871, along with the rest of Prussia, Hanover became part of the German Empire upon the unification of Germany. Briefly revived as the State of Hanover in 1946, the state was later merged with some smaller states to form the current state of Lower Saxony in West Germany.

== History ==
The territory of Hanover had earlier been a principality within the Holy Roman Empire before being elevated into an electorate in 1708, when Hanover was formed by the union of the dynastic divisions of the Duchy of Brunswick-Lüneburg, excepting the Principality of Brunswick-Wolfenbüttel.

After his accession in 1714, George Louis of the House of Hanover ascended the throne of Great Britain as George I, and Hanover was joined in a personal union with Great Britain. In 1803, Hanover was conquered by the French and Prussian armies in the Napoleonic Wars. The Treaties of Tilsit in 1807 joined it to territories from Prussia and created the Kingdom of Westphalia, ruled by Napoleon's youngest brother, Jérôme Bonaparte. French control lasted until October 1813, when the territory was overrun by Russian Cossacks. The Battle of Leipzig, shortly thereafter, spelled the definitive end of the Napoleonic client states, and the electorate was restored to the House of Hanover.

The terms of the Congress of Vienna in 1814 not only restored Hanover but also elevated it to an independent kingdom with its Prince-Elector, George III of the United Kingdom, as King of Hanover. The new kingdom was also greatly expanded and became the fourth-largest state in the German Confederation (behind Prussia, Austria and Bavaria) and the second-largest in northern Germany.

George III never visited the kingdom during his 60-year reign. Having succumbed to dementia prior to the elevation of Hanover, it is unlikely that he ever understood that he had gained an additional kingship, and he took no role in its governance. Functional administration of Hanover was usually handled by a viceroy, which during the later years of George III's reign and the reigns of Kings George IV and William IV from 1816 to 1837, was Adolph Frederick, George III's youngest surviving son.

In 1837, when Queen Victoria succeeded to the British throne, the 123-year personal union of Great Britain and Hanover ended. Unlike in Britain, semi-Salic law operated in Hanover, prohibiting the accession to the throne by a female if any male of the dynasty had survived.

In June 1837, Ernest Augustus, now the eldest surviving son of George III, succeeded to the throne as King of Hanover. Adolph Frederick, the younger brother and long-time Viceroy, returned to Britain. Ernest Augustus had a personally strained relationship with his niece Queen Victoria, and they frequently squabbled over family affairs. Domestically, his reign began with a constitutional crisis as he tried to suspend parliament and nullify the written constitution of 1819. He also presided over the country during the turbulent Revolutions of 1848.

His son, George V, assumed the throne in 1851.

=== Annexation ===
In 1866, during the Austro-Prussian War, Hanover, along with some other member states of the German Confederation, attempted to maintain a neutral position. After Hanover voted in favour of mobilising confederation troops against Prussia on 14 June 1866, Prussia saw this as a just cause for declaring war.

The outcome of the Battle of Langensalza led to the dissolution of Hanover as an independent kingdom, which was annexed by the Kingdom of Prussia and became the Prussian Province of Hanover. In 1871, along with the rest of Prussia, it became part of the German Empire.

After George V fled Hanover in 1866, he raised forces loyal to him in the Netherlands, called the Guelphic Legion. It was disbanded in 1870. George refused to accept the Prussian takeover of his realm and claimed he was still the legitimate king of Hanover.

The private wealth of the dethroned House of Hanover was then used by Otto von Bismarck to finance his continuing efforts against Ludwig II of Bavaria.

=== Continuing Claim ===
His only son, Ernest Augustus, Crown Prince of Hanover, inherited the claim upon George's death in 1878. Ernest Augustus was also first in line to the throne of the Duchy of Brunswick, whose rulers had been a junior branch of the House of Hanover. In 1884, that branch became extinct with the death of William, a distant cousin of Ernest Augustus.

Since Ernest Augustus refused to renounce his claim to annexed Hanover, the Bundesrat of the German Empire ruled that he would disturb the peace of the empire if he ascended the throne of Brunswick. As a result, Brunswick was ruled by a regency until 1913, when his son, also named Ernest Augustus, married the German Emperor's daughter, Princess Viktoria Luise and swore allegiance to the German Empire. The Duke then renounced his claim to Brunswick in favour of his son, and the Bundesrat allowed the younger Ernest Augustus to take possession of Brunswick as a kind of dowry compensation for Hanover.

The German-Hanoverian Party, which at times supported secession from the Reich, demanded a separate status for the province in the Reichstag. The party existed until banned by the Nazi government.

=== Revival and modern history ===
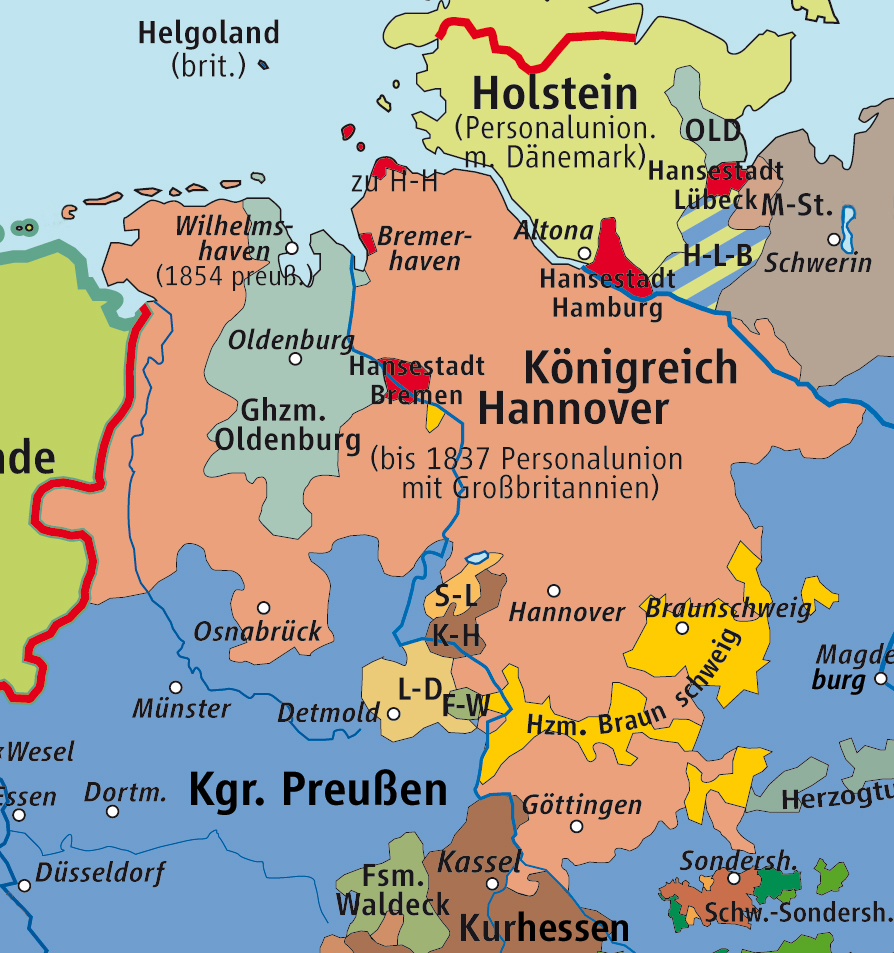
A map of the Kingdom of Hanover, 1814–1866, recreated in 1946 as the State of Hanover

With Prussia on the verge of official dissolution (1947), Hanoverian politicians in 1946 took advantage of the opportunity and advocated that the Control Commission for Germany (British Element) (CCG/BE) revive Hanoverian statehood, reconstituting the Prussian Province of Hanover as the State of Hanover. The state saw itself in the tradition of the kingdom.

Its prime minister, Hinrich Wilhelm Kopf, played a central role when the state of Lower Saxony was founded just a few months later by merging Hanover with several smaller states, with the city of Hanover as its capital. The former territory of Hanover makes up 85 per cent of Lower Saxony and is the origin of its coat of arms.

== Reorganisation of religious bodies ==
The Lutheran church was the state church of the Kingdom of Hanover, with the King being summus episcopus (Supreme Governor of the Lutheran Church). Regional consistories supervised church and clergy. These were in Aurich, a simultaneously Lutheran and Calvinist consistory dominated by Lutherans (for East Frisia) and the Lutheran consistories in Hanover (for the former Electorate of Brunswick-Lüneburg proper), in Ilfeld (for the County of Hohenstein, a Hanoverian exclave in the Eastern Harz mountains), in Osnabrück (for the former Prince-Bishopric of Osnabrück), in Otterndorf (existed 1535–1885 for the Land of Hadeln) as well as in Stade (existed 1650–1903, until 1885 for the former Bremen-Verden proper without Hadeln, then including the complete Stade region). A general superintendent chaired each consistory.

In 1848, the Lutheran parishes were democratised by the introduction of presbyteries (German: Kirchenvorstände, singular Kirchenvorstand; literally: church boards), elected by all major male parishioners and chairing each congregation in co-operation with the pastor, being before the sole chairman. This introduction of presbyteries was somewhat revolutionary in the rather hierarchically structured Lutheran church.

In 1864, Carl Lichtenberg, Hanoverian minister of education, cultural and religious affairs (1862–65), persuaded the Ständeversammlung (lit. Estates Assembly, the Hanoverian parliament) to pass a new law as to the constitution of the Lutheran church. The constitution provided a state synod (parishioners' parliament, German: Landessynode). But its first session only materialised in 1869 when, after the 1866 Prussian annexation of the Kingdom of Hanover, the Hanoverian Lutherans desired a representative body separate from Prussian rule, though it was restricted to Lutheran matters only.

After the Prussian conquest in 1866, on 19 September 1866, the day before the official Prussian annexation took place and with the last summus episcopus, King George V of Hanover, in exile, the Kingdom's six consistories joined to form today's still-existing church body, the Lutheran State Church of Hanover. An all-Hanoverian consistory, the Landeskonsistorium (state consistory), was formed with representatives from the regional consistories.

While the Calvinist congregations in formerly-Prussian East Frisia had a common roof organisation with the Lutherans there ("Coetus") and the Reformed Church in the former County of Bentheim, then being the state church, had fully established church bodies for Bentheim only (German: Königlich-Großbrittanisch-Hannoverscher Ober-Kirchenrath, English: Royal British-Hanoverian Supreme Church Council), the Calvinist congregations elsewhere in Hanover were in a somewhat sorry state.

Some Calvinist congregations of Huguenot origin were organised in the Lower Saxon Confederation (German: Niedersächsische Konföderation). The Lutheran church, being the state church of Hanover, also supervised the Calvinist diaspora parishes outside East Frisia and Bentheim. In 1848 the new Hanoverian law also provided for presbyteries in these Calvinist parishes, which exactly fit the presbyterian structure of Calvinism.

Catholics formed an overall minority in Hanover, but regionally majorities in the former prince-bishoprics. By the annexations in 1803 and 1814, Hanover had become a state of three Christian denominations. In 1824, Hanover and the Holy See thus agreed to integrate diaspora parishes which were located in predominantly Protestant areas, until then supervised by the Roman Catholic Vicariate Apostolic of the Nordic Missions, into the existing dioceses of the former prince-bishoprics, whose diocesan territories were thus extended into the diaspora areas.

Jews lived all over Hanover in diaspora. Until 1806, they were not allowed to reside in some areas. By the Westphalian and French annexations in 1807 and 1810, all-male inhabitants in later restituted Hanover became Westphalian or French citizens of equal rights. On 17 March 1808, Napoléon Bonaparte restricted the rights of Jews in the French-annexed territory by his so-called décret infâme. The Jewish congregations became subject to French regional Jewish consistories or the Royal Westphalian Consistory of the Israelites, respectively. In 1813, when Hanover resumed independence and sovereignty, its government deprived the Jews of their legal equality. Arguing it was the French or Westphalian state and not Hanover, which had emancipated the Jews, the government took the decisions of the German Confederation on the rights of the Jews, in Johann Smidt's manipulated formulation, as the legal grounds.

In 1842, Hanover finally granted equal rights to Jews and promoted building up Jewish congregations, where this did not already happen earlier, and a superstructure of four regional land-rabbinates. These were the Emden Land-Rabbinate (Aurich and Osnabrück regions), the Hanover Land-Rabbinate (Hanover and Lüneburg regions), the Hildesheim Land-Rabbinate (Hildesheim region and Clausthal Mountain Captaincy), and the Stade Land-Rabbinate (Stade region).

In many diaspora areas, Jews regarded this as progress and a burden alike, because of the implied financial burden for rabbis and religion teacher, synagogues or schools. The local authorities now requested that the Jewish congregations establish synagogues and Jewish education for the pupils. The land-rabbins, chairing the land-rabbinates, simultaneously fulfilled religious and state functions, like supervising Jewish elementary schools and the teaching of Jewish religion in all schools. The Kingdom of Hanover was thus one of the few states within the German Confederation, where rabbins held a similar semi-state authoritative position as to Jews as did, e.g., Lutheran clergy towards Lutherans.

== Kings ==
In 1813, George III was restored to his Hanoverian territories. In October 1814, they were constituted as the independent Kingdom of Hanover at the Congress of Vienna. The personal union with the United Kingdom ended in 1837 on the accession of Queen Victoria because the succession laws in Hanover, based on semi-Salic law, prevented a female from inheriting the title if there was a surviving male heir. In the United Kingdom, a male took precedence only over his own sisters.

Portrait	Name	Lifespan	Reign began	Reign ended	Succession	Notes
	George III; German: Georg III.	4 June 1738 – 29 January 1820 (aged 81)	12 October 1814	29 January 1820	Previously Prince Elector of Hanover from 1760 to 1806.	George III was mentally incapacitated during these years, and his constitutional powers were exercised by his eldest son, George Augustus Frederick (the future George IV), as Regent. In Hanover, his youngest son, Prince Adolphus, Duke of Cambridge, officiated as Viceroy from 1816.
	George IV; German: Georg IV.	12 August 1762 – 26 June 1830 (aged 67)	29 January 1820	26 June 1830	Son of George III.	Prince regent 1811–1820, represented in Hanover by his brother, the Duke of Cambridge, as Viceroy
	William IV; German: Wilhelm IV.	21 August 1765 – 20 June 1837 (aged 71)	26 June 1830	20 June 1837	Son of George III • Younger brother of George IV.	Last monarch to rule both Hanover and the United Kingdom, represented in Hanover by his brother, the Duke of Cambridge, as Viceroy
	Ernest Augustus; German: Ernst August.	5 June 1771 – 18 November 1851 (aged 80)	20 June 1837	18 November 1851	Son of George III • Younger brother of George IV and William IV.	The accession of Queen Victoria separated the crowns of the United Kingdom and Hanover, and the latter passed to her uncle.
	George V German: Georg V.	27 May 1819 – 12 June 1878 (aged 59)	18 November 1851	20 September 1866	Son of Ernest Augustus.	Hanover was annexed by Prussia in the aftermath of the Austro-Prussian War.

== Territory and administrative subdivisions ==
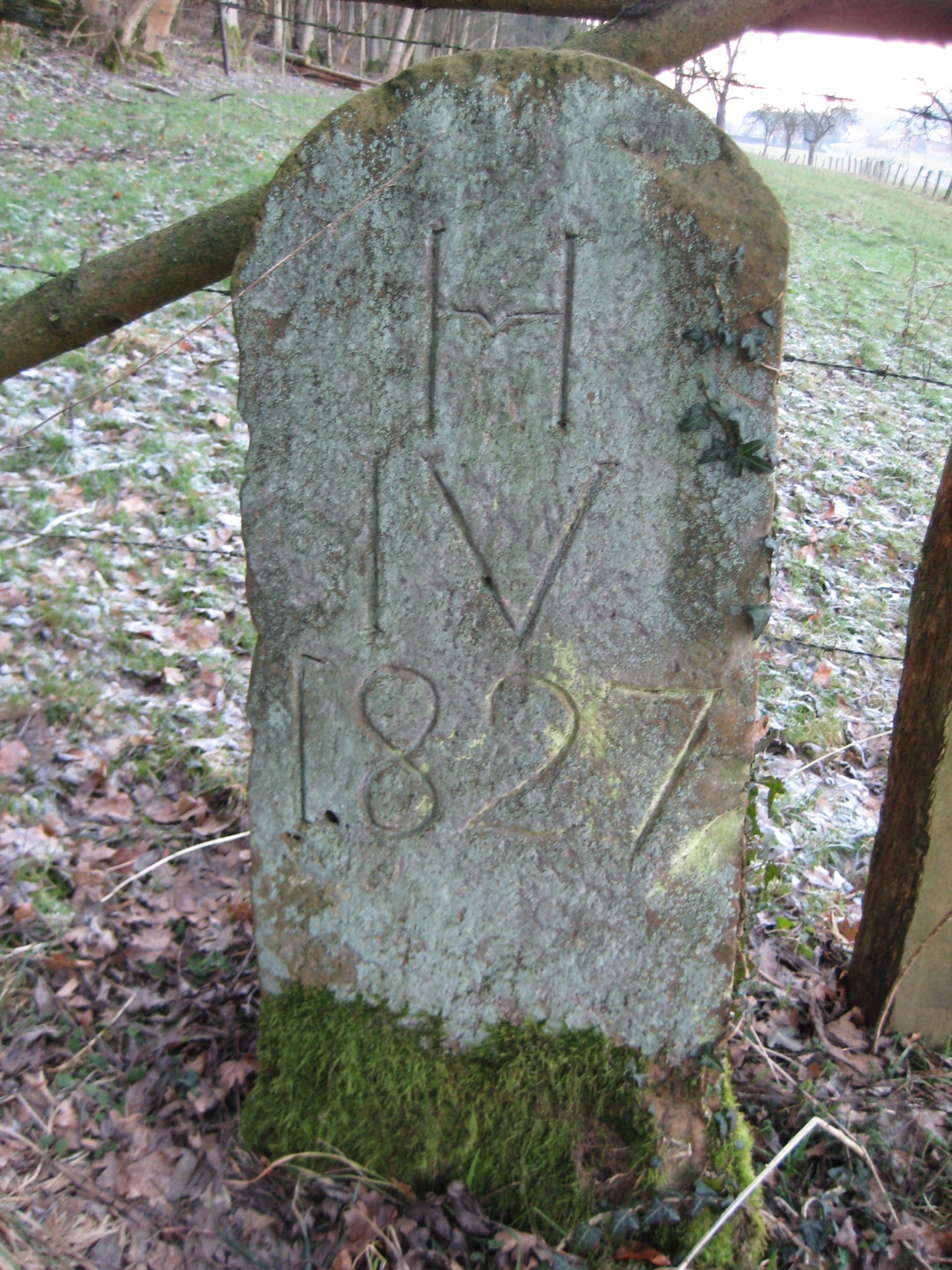
A border marker of Hanover

The Congress of Vienna instituted a territorial adjustment between Hanover and Prussia to form more contiguous borders. Hanover increased its area substantially, gaining the Prince-Bishopric of Hildesheim, East Frisia, the Prince-Bishopric of Osnabrück, the Lower County of Lingen and the northern part of the Prince-Bishopric of Münster. Hanover also annexed territories that had previously been ruled in personal union by its Elector, such as the Duchies of Bremen-Verden and the County of Bentheim. It lost those parts of Saxe-Lauenburg to the northeast of the Elbe, which was assigned in personal union to Denmark, except the Amt Neuhaus. Further small exclaves in the east were lost.

Hanover comprised a number of territories, which had been Imperial Estates within the Holy Roman Empire. Their respective governments, now called provincial governments, were organised according to partially very old traditions, including different levels of estate participation in rule. In 1823, the kingdom was reorganised into high-bailiwicks (German: Landdrosteien, singular: Landdrostei), each led by a high-bailiff (German: Landdrost) according to unitary standards, doing away with the inherited provincial peculiarities.

The high-bailiwicks were subdivided into bailiwicks (German: Ämter, singular Amt), presided by a bailiff (Amtmann, plural Amtleute). The high-bailiwicks, named after their capitals, were the following:

- Aurich, comprising former East Frisia
- Hanover, comprising about the former Principality of Calenberg in the Duchy of Brunswick-Lüneburg
- Hildesheim, comprising the former Brunswick-Lüneburg Principality of Grubenhagen and the former Prince-Bishopric of Hildesheim
- Lüneburg, comprising the former Brunswick-Lüneburg Principality of Lüneburg and the remainder of Saxe-Lauenburg areas
- Osnabrück, comprising the former County of Bentheim, the former Lower County of Lingen, and the former Prince-Bishopric of Osnabrück
- Stade, comprising the former Duchies of Bremen-Verden

The Hanoverian subdivisions into high-bailiwicks and bailiwicks remained unchanged until 1 April 1885, when they were replaced by Prussian-style provinces (Regierungsbezirke) and districts (Kreise).

=== Image gallery ===
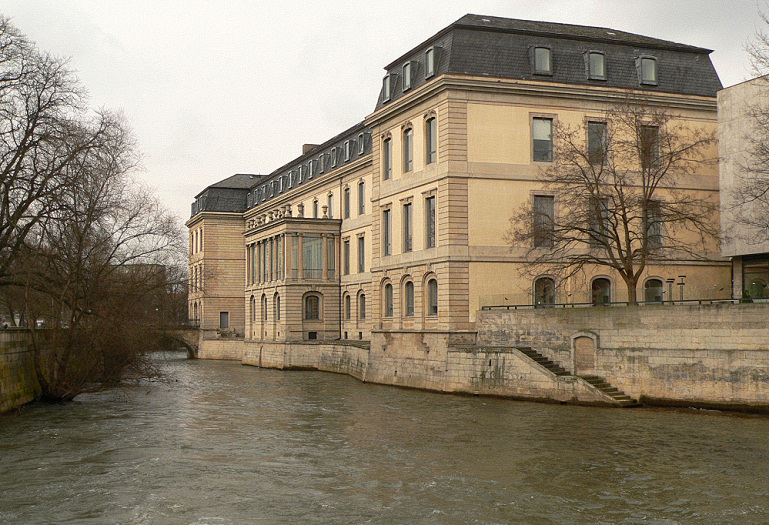
The Leine Palace

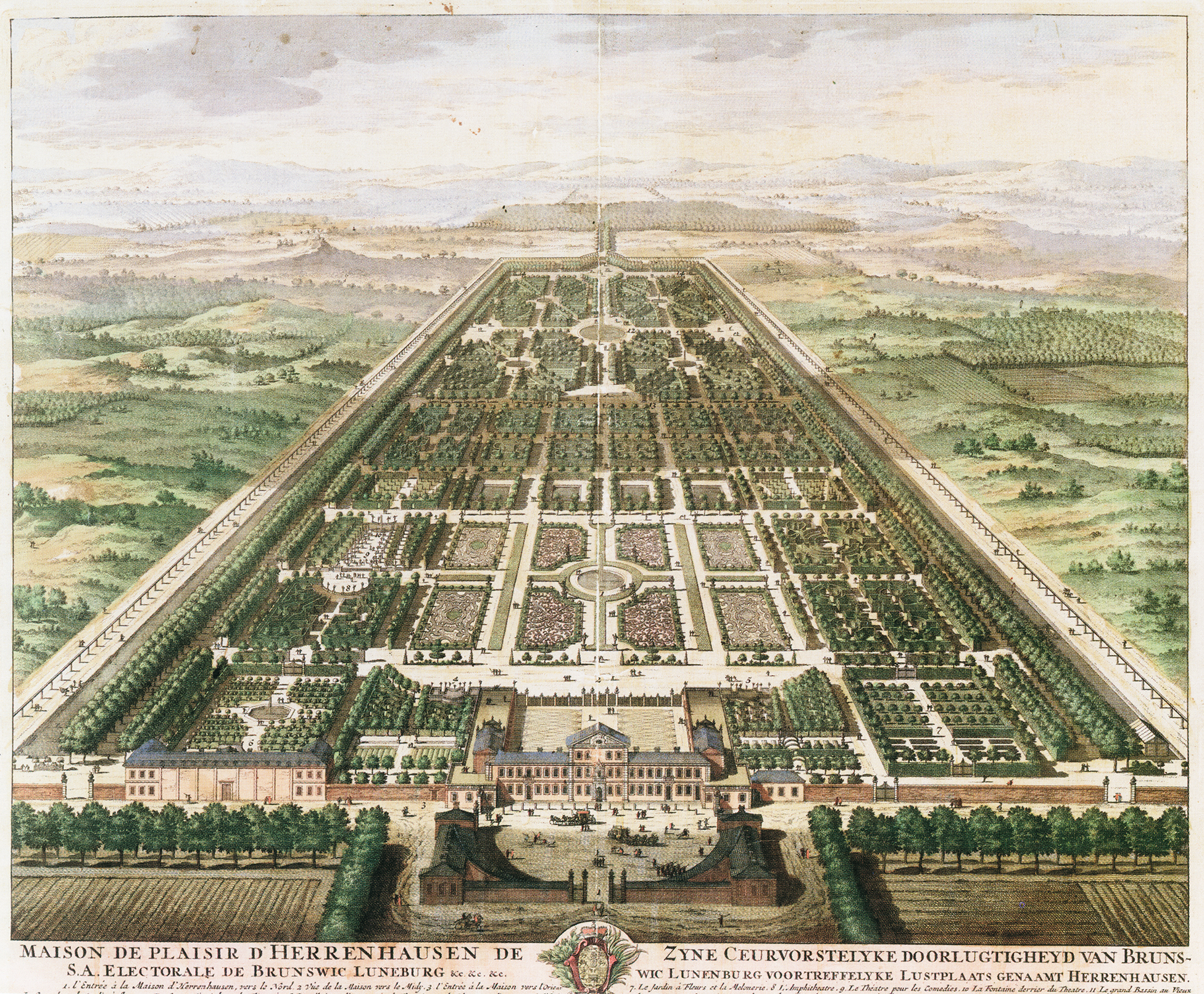
Herrenhausen Castle and Gardens

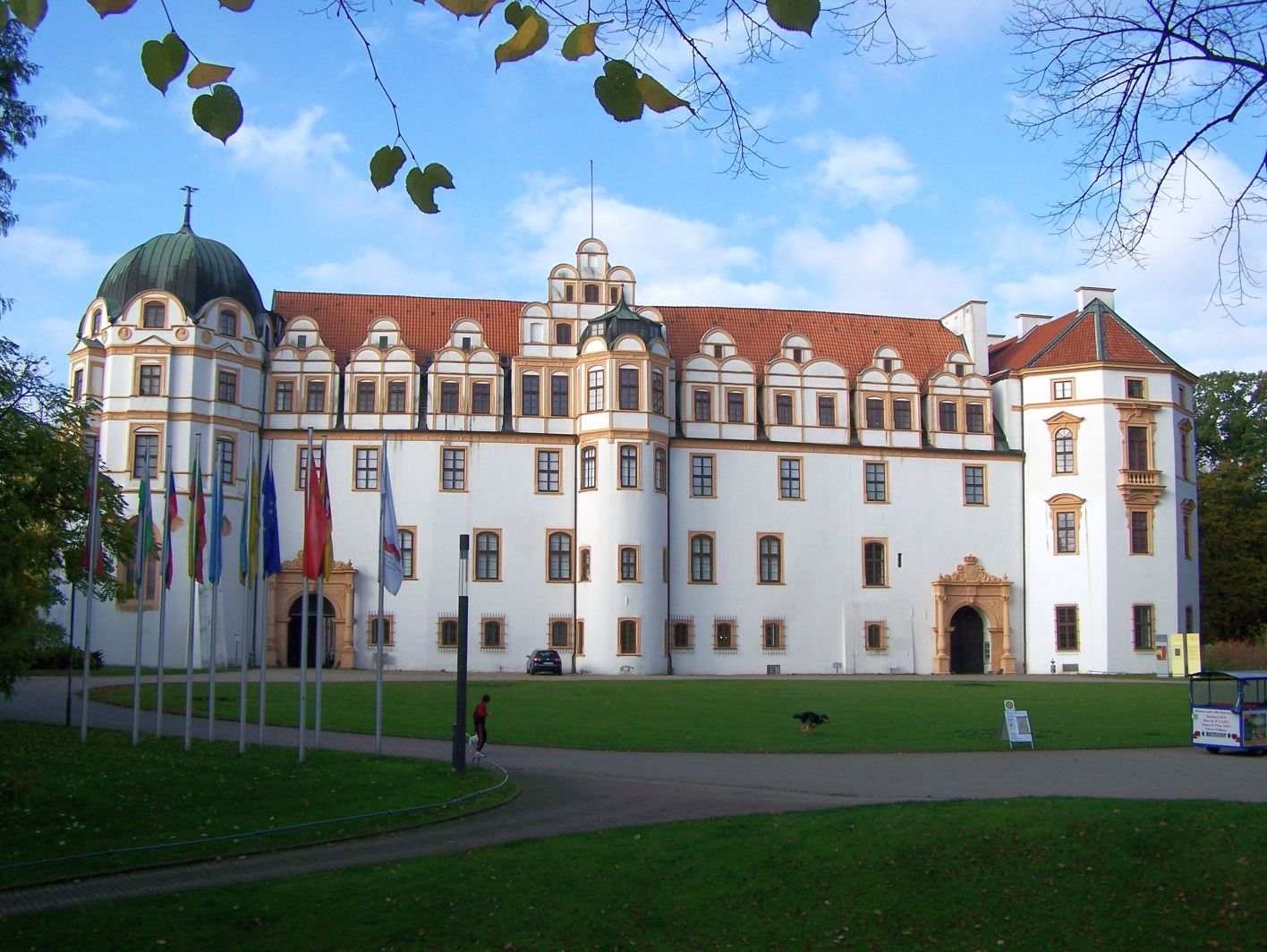
Celle Castle

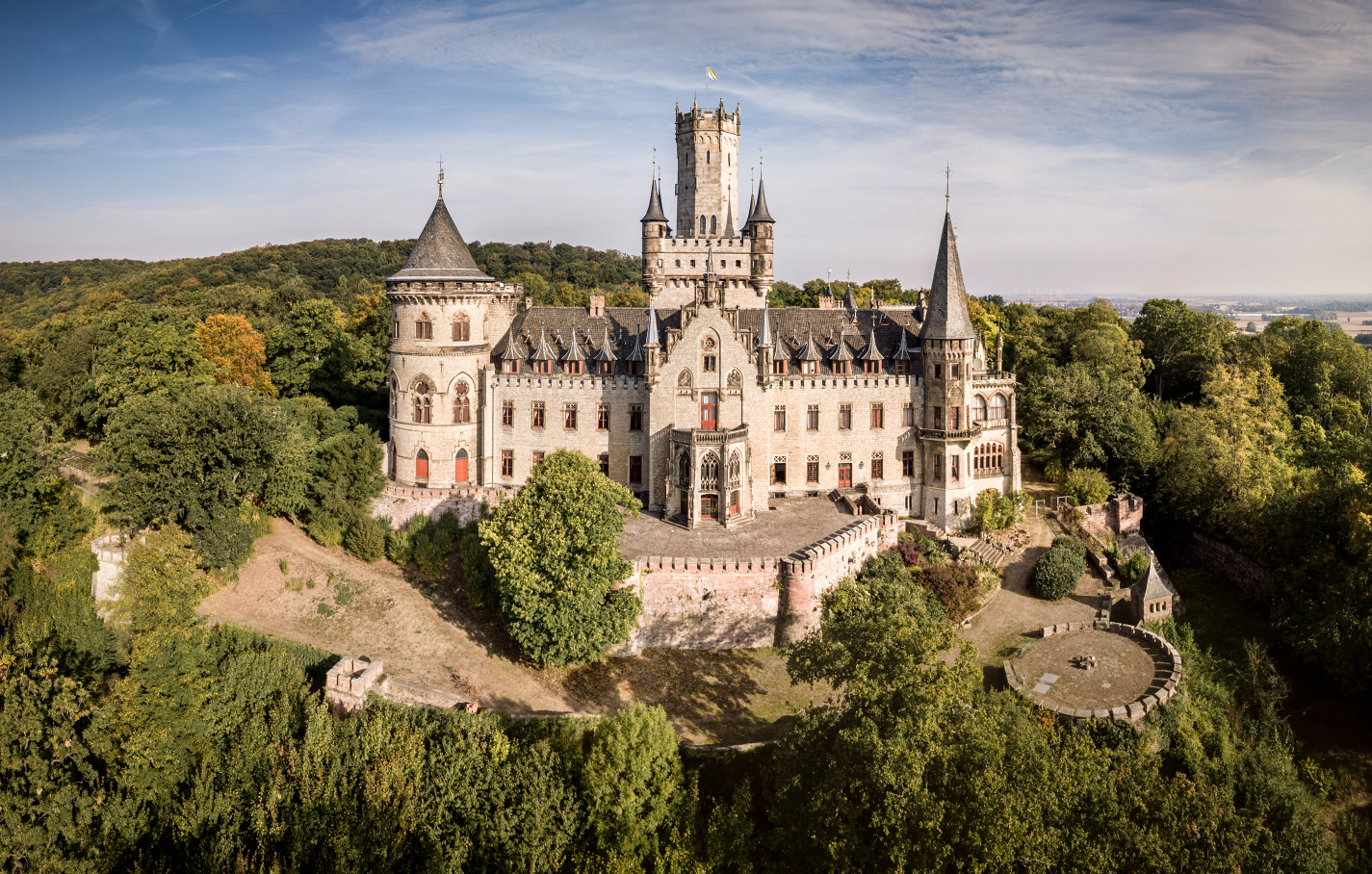
Marienburg Castle, present seat of the Princes of Hanover

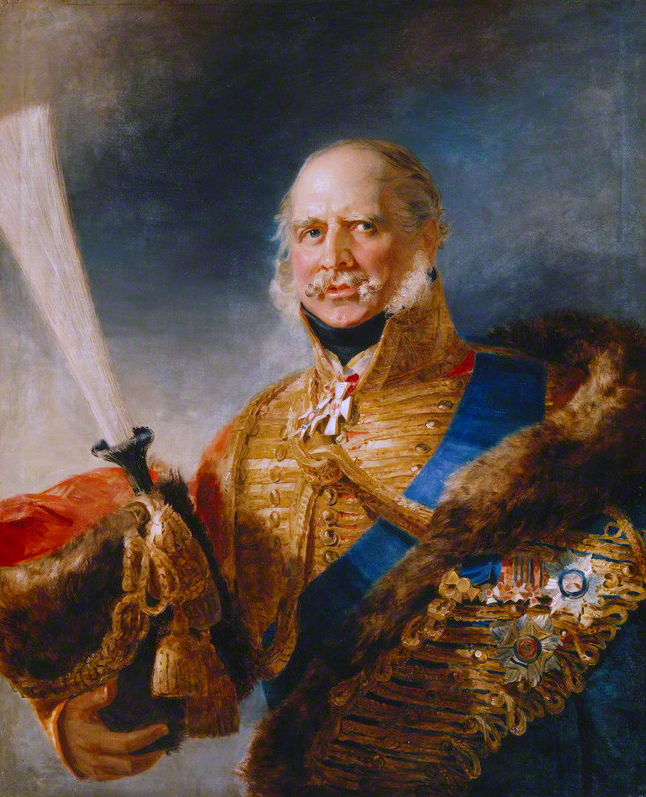
Portrait of Ernest Augustus by George Dawe

== Army ==
The Kingdom of Hanover maintained an army after the Napoleonic Wars. In 1832, King William IV of Hanover and the United Kingdom issued his troops with British Army uniforms, but they differed slightly from their original British versions. When the personal union with the United Kingdom ended in 1837, and Ernst August ascended to the crown of Hanover, he replaced their uniforms with Prussian Army-style ones, which included the pickelhaube spiked helmet for his Guard Corps.

By 1866 they wore a more Austrian style of uniform, with only the guard corps keeping the Prussian one. During the Austro-Prussian War, the Hanoverian Army fought and defeated the Prussians during its march south towards Austria, at the Battle of Langensalza. It was later surrounded and forced to surrender to Prussia.

== Standard, ensign and coat of arms ==
After the personal union with the United Kingdom ended in 1837 with the accession of Queen Victoria, Hanover kept the British royal arms and standard, only introducing a new Crown, after the British model. The centre of this coat of arms and royal standard included the original arms of Hanover, which consisted of the two lions of the Brunswick, the rampant lion with hearts of Lüneburg and the horse of Hanover, surmounted by the Imperial Crown of the Holy Roman Empire for the Holy Roman office of Archbannerbearer/Archtreasurer. As Hanover was no longer ruled by the British monarchs, the arms of Hanover were simultaneously removed from the British coat of arms and royal standard, so it was no longer identical with that of the Kingdom of Hanover.

The royal standard of Hanover, 1816–1837

The coat of arms of Hanover, 1837

The civil ensign of Hanover.

The royal standard of Hanover after 1837.

== See also ==
- History of Hanover
- Guelphic Legion
- King's German Legion
- Kleindeutsche Lösung
- State of Hanover
- King of Hanover
- House of Hanover
