= Lüneburg (region) =

Coordinates: 53.24594°N 10.40934°E

- Regierungsbezirk
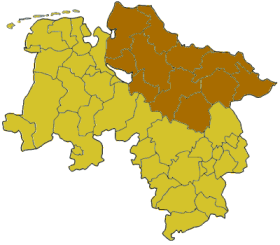
- Lüneburg (1978-2004) in Lower Saxony
- Country: Germany
- State: Lower Saxony
- Disestablished: 2004-12-31
- Region seat: Lüneburg

Area
  - Total: 15,507.1 km^{2} (5,987.3 sq mi)

Population (30 Sep. 2004)
  - Total: 1,702,179
  - Density: 109.768/km^{2} (284.297/sq mi)

GDP
  - Total: €52.524 billion (2021)

Lüneburg was one of the four Regierungsbezirke of Lower Saxony, Germany, located in the north of the federal state between the three cities Bremen, Hamburg and Hanover.

The region was created under royal Hanoverian rule in 1823 as Landdrostei Lüneburg (roughly: High Bailiwick of Lüneburg), renamed Regierungsbezirk (roughly: governorate) in 1885, when it was a subdivision of the Prussian province of Hanover. On 1 February 1978 the Lüneburg Region incorporated the neighbouring Stade Region. The governorate, like all the other Lower Saxon governorates, was dissolved in 2004.

Kreise (districts)

1. Celle
2. Cuxhaven
3. Harburg
4. Lüchow-Dannenberg
5. Lüneburg
6. Osterholz
7. Rotenburg
8. Heidekreis
9. Stade
10. Uelzen
11. Verden
