= Province of Hanover =

Province of Prussia (1866–1946)

Province of Hanover Provinz Hannover (German)
- Province of Prussia
- 1866–1946
- Flag Coat of arms

- The Province of Hanover (red), within the Kingdom of Prussia (blue and red), within the German Empire (blue, red, and beige)
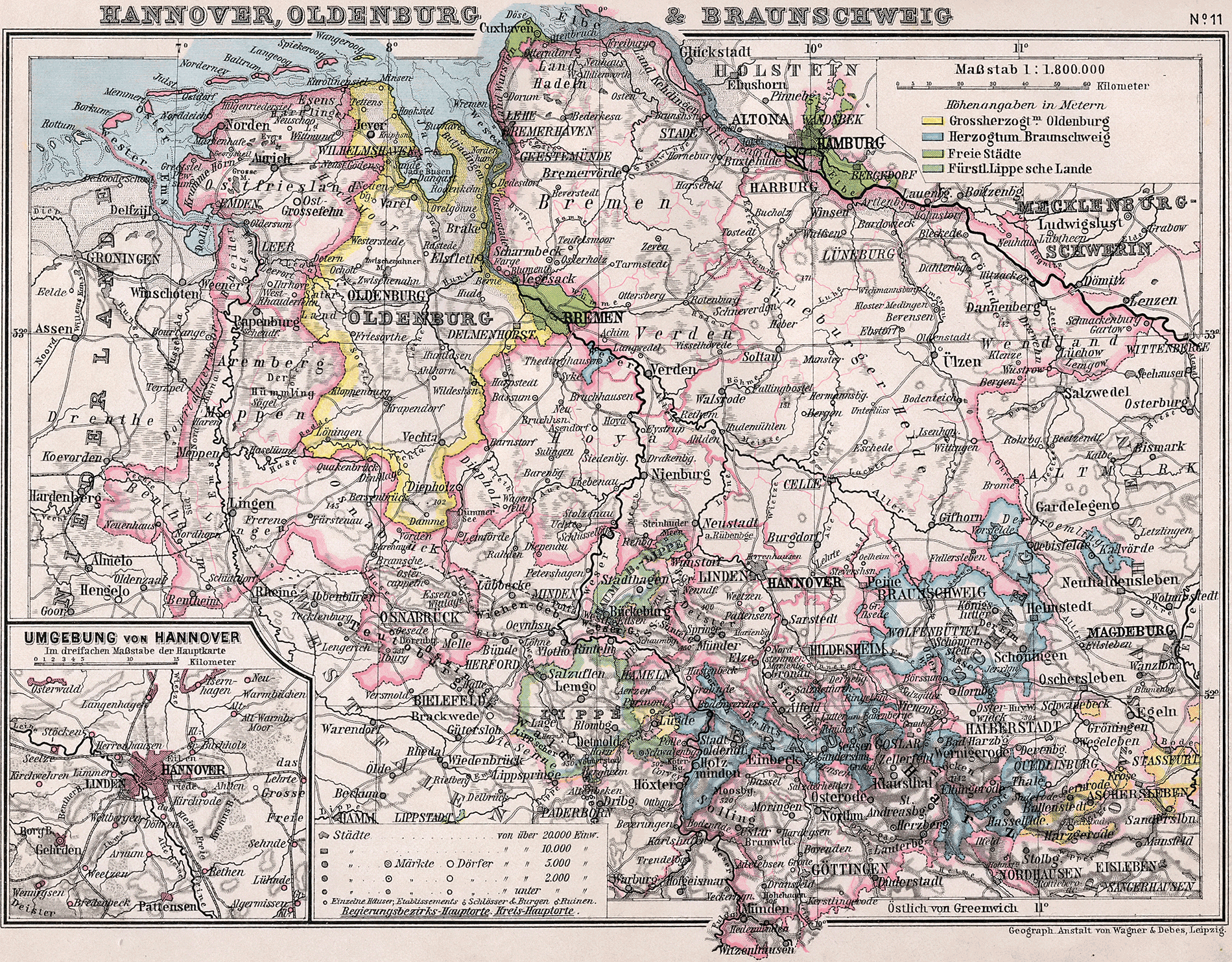
- Capital: Hanover
- Area
  - Coordinates: 52°22′N 9°43′E
  - 1939: 38,705 km^{2} (14,944 sq mi)
- Population
  - 1939: 3.537.390
- History
  - Established: 1866
  - Disestablished: 1946
- Political subdivisions: Aurich; Hanover; Hildesheim; Lüneburg; Osnabrück; Stade
Preceded by	Succeeded by
Kingdom of Hanover	State of Hanover; State of Mecklenburg
- Today part of: Germany

The Province of Hanover (German: Provinz Hannover) was a province of the Kingdom of Prussia and the Free State of Prussia from 1866 to 1946.

During the Austro-Prussian War, the Kingdom of Hanover had attempted to maintain a neutral position, along with some other member states of the German Confederation. After Hanover voted in favour of mobilising confederation troops against Prussia on 14 June 1866, Prussia saw this as a just cause for declaring war; the Kingdom of Hanover was soon dissolved and annexed by Prussia. The private wealth of the dethroned House of Hanover was then used by Otto von Bismarck to finance his continuing efforts against Ludwig II of Bavaria.

In August 1946, the British military administration recreated the State of Hanover based on the former Kingdom of Hanover but, three months later, it was merged into the new state (Bundesland) of Lower Saxony along with the states of Oldenburg, Brunswick, and Schaumburg-Lippe, with the city of Hanover as the capital of this new state.

== Hanoverian regions ==
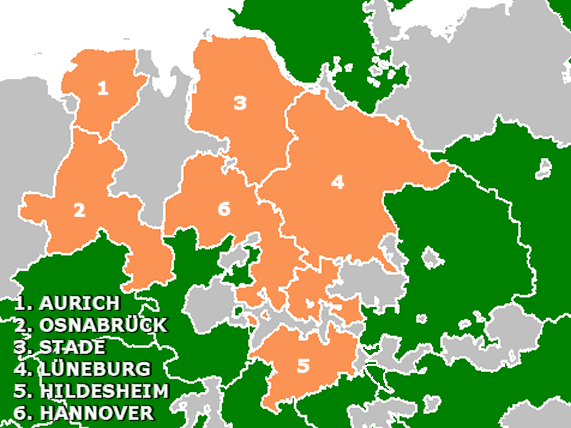
The six Hanoveran regions.

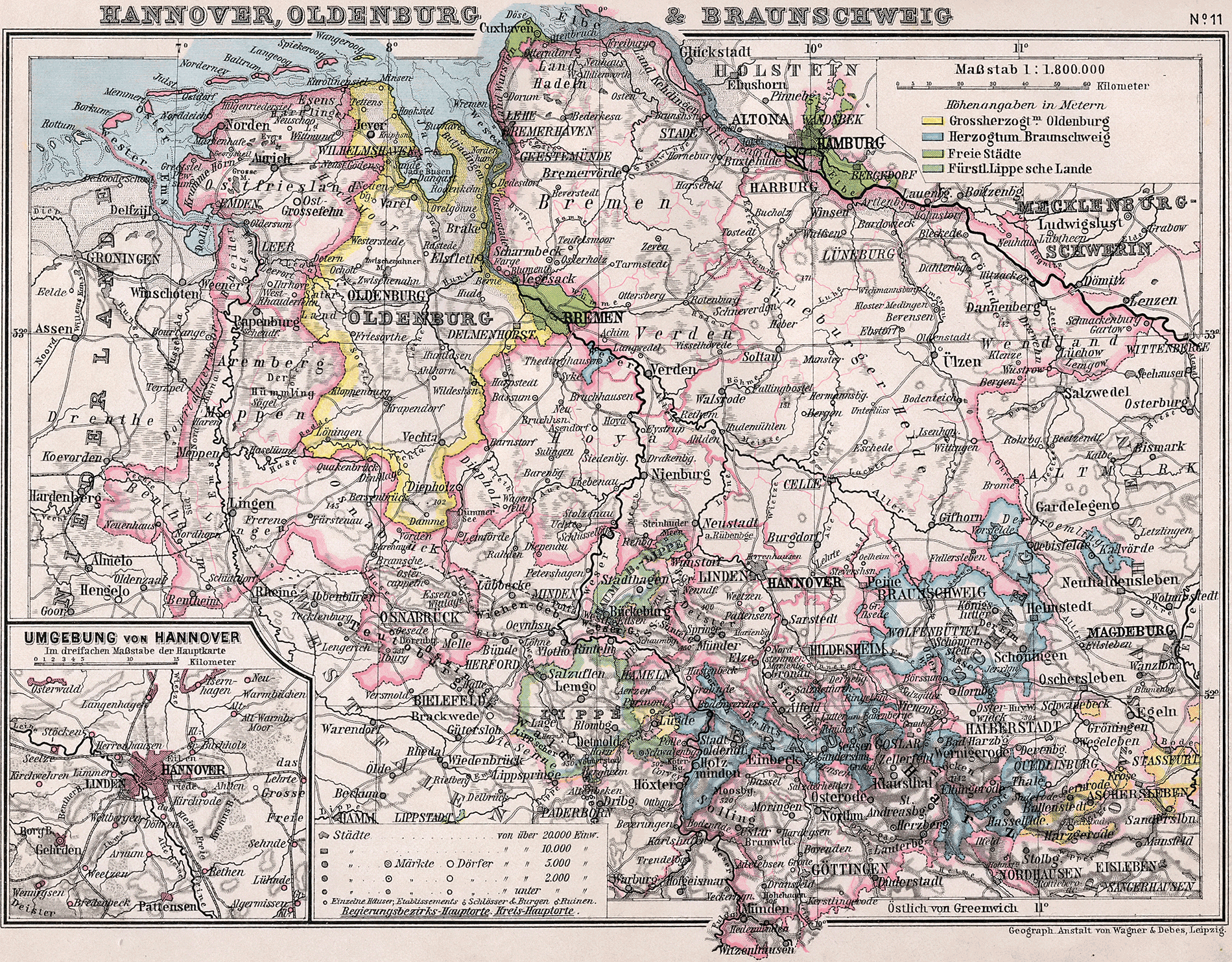
Hannover, Oldenburg, Brunswick (1905)

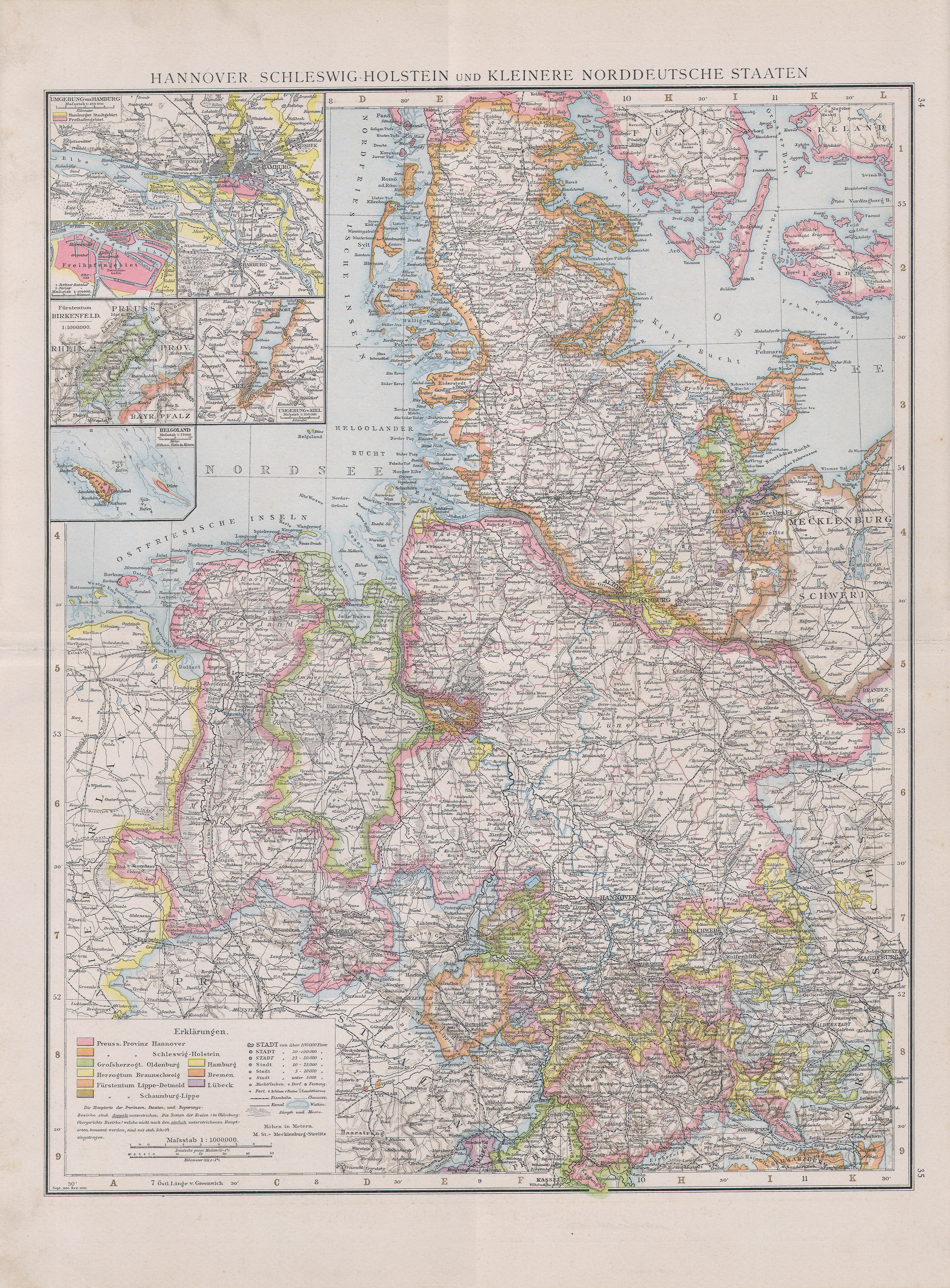
Hannover, Schleswig-Holstein and small Northern German States (1890)

Hanover was subdivided into six regions first called Landdrostei[en] (High-Bailiwick[s]), which were reorganised into Prussian standard Regierungsbezirke (governorates) on 1 April 1885.

1. Aurich
2. Osnabrück
3. Stade
4. Lüneburg (Lunenburg)
5. Hildesheim
6. Hanover

== Administrative divisions from 1885 ==
On 1 April 1885 the six Landdrosteien were turned into regional administrative districts called Regierungsbezirke:

1. Regierungsbezirk Aurich
2. Regierungsbezirk Hannover
3. Regierungsbezirk Hildesheim
4. Regierungsbezirk Lüneburg
5. Regierungsbezirk Osnabrück
6. Regierungsbezirk Stade

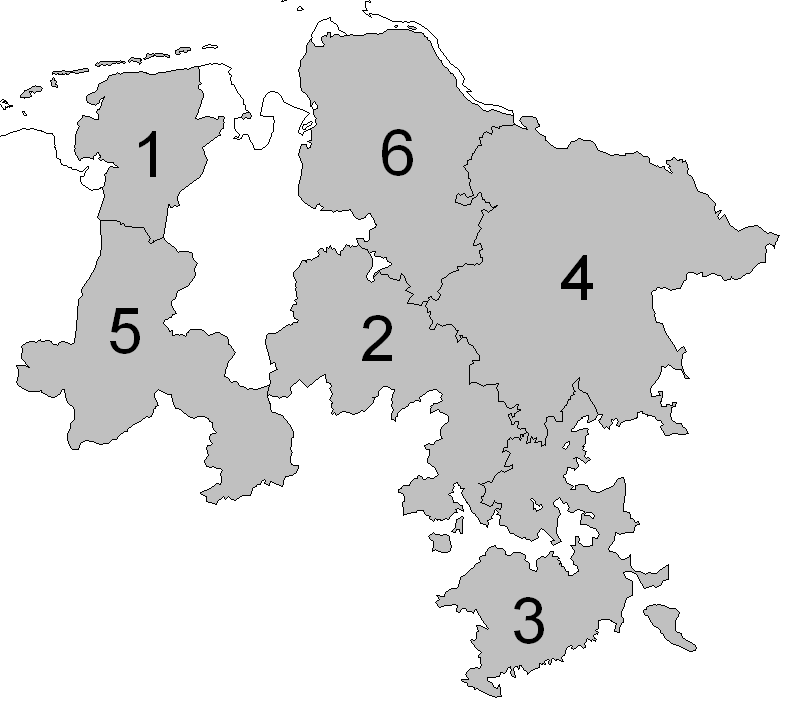

The Regierungsbezirke were subdivided into new urban and rural counties (Stadtkreise and Landkreise), the old Amt structure being disbanded. Where the name of the county town differs from that of the county, it is shown in brackets:

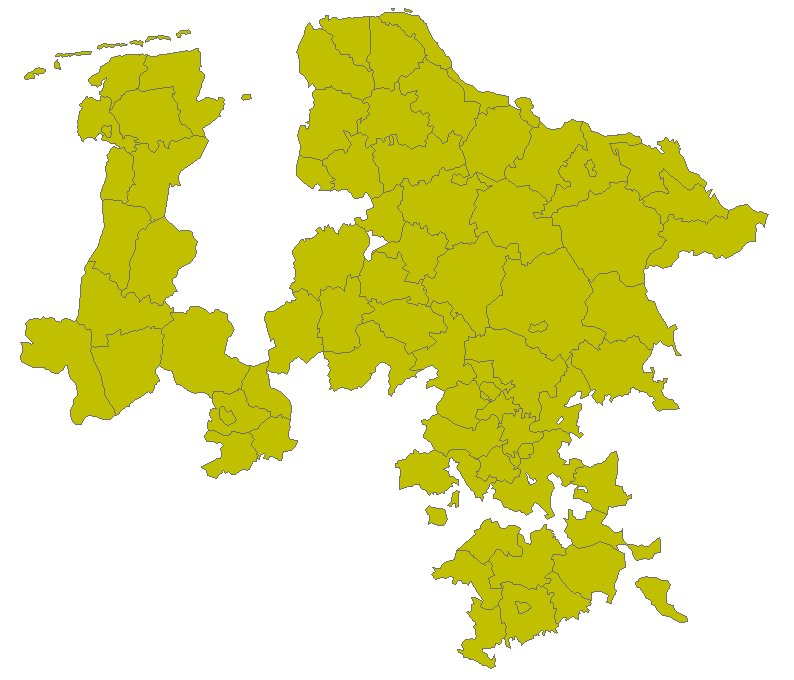
Counties in the province of Hanover (1905)

=== Regierungsbezirk Aurich ===
==== Stadtkreise ====
- Emden
- Wilhelmshaven (1919–1937, then ceded to Oldenburg)

==== Landkreise ====
- Aurich
- Emden (to 1932, then divided between the town of Emden, Landkreis Norden and Landkreis Leer)
- Leer
- Norden
- Weener (to 1932, then to Landkreis Leer)
- Wittmund

=== Regierungsbezirk Hannover ===
==== Stadtkreise ====
- Hamelin (from 1923)
- Hanover
- Linden (1886–1920, then to the city of Hanover)

==== Landkreise ====
- Grafschaft Diepholz (county offices in Diepholz, to 1932 Kreis Diepholz)
- Grafschaft Hoya (county offices in Syke, before 1932 Kreis Hoya)
- Grafschaft Schaumburg (county offices in Rinteln, before 1932 Province of Hesse-Nassau)
- Hameln-Pyrmont (county offices in Hamelin, before 1922 Kreis Hameln)
- Hanover
- Linden (to 1932, then to Landkreis Hannover)
- Neustadt am Rübenberge
- Nienburg/Weser
- Springe
- Stolzenau (to 1932, then to Landkreis Nienburg/Weser)
- Sulingen (to 1932, then to Landkreis Grafschaft Diepholz)
- Syke (to 1932, then to Landkreis Grafschaft Hoya)

=== Regierungsbezirk Hildesheim ===
==== Stadtkreise ====
- Göttingen
- Goslar (to 1941, then to Brunswick)
- Hildesheim

==== Landkreise ====
- Alfeld
- Duderstadt
- Einbeck
- Göttingen
- Goslar (to 1941, then to Brunswick)
- Gronau
- Hildesheim
- Holzminden (from 1941, previously Brunswick)
- Ilfeld (to 1932, then to Province of Saxony)
- Marienburg i. Hann. (county offices in Hildesheim)
- Münden
- Northeim
- Osterode am Harz
- Peine
- Uslar (to 1932, then to Landkreis Northeim)
- Zellerfeld (county offices in Clausthal-Zellerfeld)

=== Regierungsbezirk Lüneburg ===
==== Stadtkreise ====
- Celle
- Harburg (1927 to Harburg-Wilhelmsburg)
- Harburg-Wilhelmsburg (1927–1937, then to Hamburg)
- Lüneburg
- Wilhelmsburg (1925–1927, then to Harburg-Wilhelmsburg)

==== Landkreise ====
- Bleckede (to 1932, then to Landkreis Lüneburg)
- Burgdorf
- Celle
- Fallingbostel
- Gifhorn
- Harburg (county offices in Hamburg-Harburg)
- Isenhagen (to 1932, then to Landkreis Gifhorn)
- Lüchow-Dannenberg (county offices in Lüchow, formed in 1932 from the counties of Lüchow and Danneberg)
- Lüneburg
- Soltau
- Uelzen (county offices to 1974 in Oldenstadt)
- Winsen

=== Regierungsbezirk Osnabrück ===
==== Stadtkreise ====
- Osnabrück

==== Landkreise ====
- Aschendorf-Hümmling (county offices in Aschendorf/Ems, formed in 1932 from the counties of Aschendorf and Hümmling)
- Landkreis Bersenbrück
- Grafschaft Bentheim (county offices in Bentheim)
- Iburg (to 1932, then to Landkreis Osnabrück)
- Lingen
- Melle
- Meppen
- Osnabrück
- Wittlage

=== Regierungsbezirk Stade ===
==== Stadtkreise ====
- Cuxhaven (from 1937, previously part of Hamburg)
- Geestemünde (1912–1924, then to Stadtkreis Wesermünde)
- Lehe (1920–1924, then to Stadtkreis Wesermünde)
- Wesermünde (formed in 1924 from the counties of Geestemünde and Lehe)

==== Landkreise ====
- Achim (to 1932, then to Landkreis Verden)
- Blumenthal (to 1932, then to Landkreis Osterholz)
- Bremervörde
- Hadeln (county offices in Otterndorf, 1932 to Landkreis Land Hadeln)
- Jork (to 1932, then to counties of Stade and Harburg)
- Kehdingen (to 1932, then to Landkreis Stade)
- Land Hadeln (county offices in Otterndorf, formed in 1932 from the counties of Hadeln and Neuhaus an der Oste)
- Neuhaus an der Oste (to 1932, then to Landkreis Land Hadeln)
- Osterholz (county offices in Osterholz-Scharmbeck)
- Rotenburg i. Hann.
- Stade
- Verden
- Wesermünde (formed in 1932 from the counties of Geestemünde and Lehe)
- Zeven (to 1932, then to Landkreis Bremervörde)

== Presidents of the Province of Hanover ==
The heads of the provinces, appointed by the central Prussian government, were called Oberpräsident (Upper President). The provincial executive, the Landesdirektor (provincial director), was elected by the provincial parliament (Provinziallandtag).

- Otto Graf zu Stolberg-Wernigerode 1867–1873
- Botho Wendt August Graf zu Eulenburg 1873–1878
- Adolf Hilmar von Leipziger 1878–1888
- Rudolf von Bennigsen 1888–1897
- Konstantin Graf zu Stolberg-Wernigerode 1898–1902
- Richard von Wentzel 1902–1914
- Ludwig Hubert von Windheim 1914–1917
- Ernst von Richter (DVP) 1917–1920
- Gustav Noske (SPD) 1920–1933
- Viktor Lutze (NSDAP) 1933–1941
- Hartmann Lauterbacher (NSDAP) 1941–1945
- Hinrich Wilhelm Kopf (SPD) 1946

== See also ==
- Kingdom of Hanover, for rulers of Hanover before the Prussian annexation
