= Otto von Bismarck =

Chancellor of Germany from 1871 to 1890

His Serene Highness Otto von Bismarck Prince of Bismarck
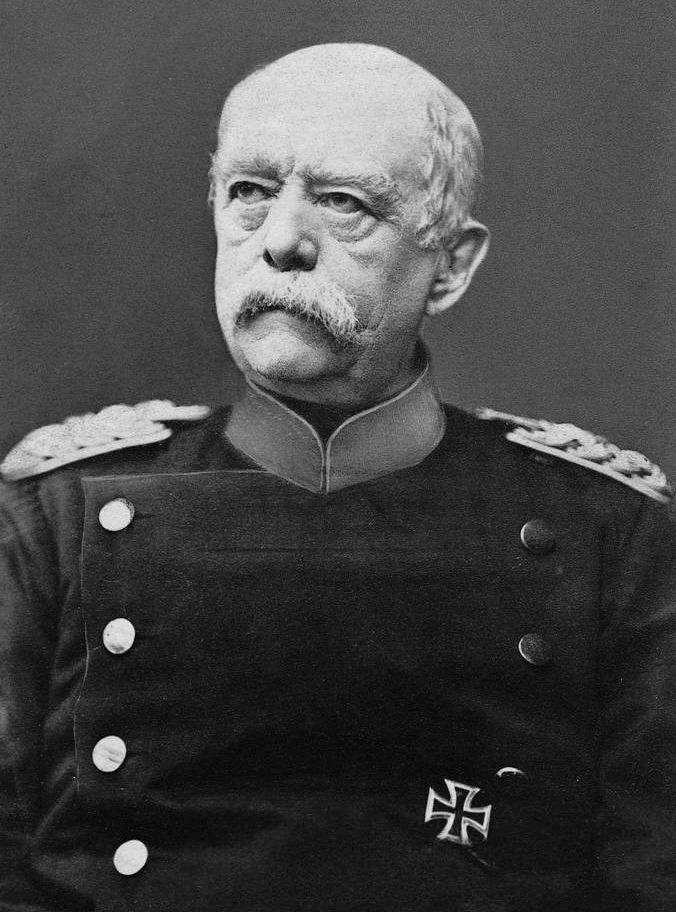
- Bismarck in 1885

Chancellor of the German Empire
- In office 21 March 1871 – 18 March 1890
- Monarchs: Wilhelm I; Friedrich III; Wilhelm II
- Deputy: Otto Graf zu Stolberg-Wernigerode; Karl Heinrich von Boetticher
- Preceded by: Position established
- Succeeded by: Leo von Caprivi
Other offices held
Federal Chancellor of the North German Confederation
In office 1 July 1867 – 21 March 1871
President	Wilhelm I
Preceded by	Position established
Succeeded by	Himself (as Chancellor of the German Empire)
Minister President of Prussia
In office 9 November 1873 – 18 March 1890
Monarchs	Wilhelm I; Friedrich III; Wilhelm II
Preceded by	Albrecht von Roon
Succeeded by	Leo von Caprivi
In office 23 September 1862 – 1 January 1873
Monarch	Wilhelm I
Preceded by	Adolf zu Hohenlohe-Ingelfingen
Succeeded by	Albrecht von Roon
Minister of Foreign Affairs
In office 23 November 1862 – 18 March 1890
Prime Minister	Himself; Albrecht von Roon
Preceded by	Albrecht von Bernstorff
Succeeded by	Leo von Caprivi

Personal details
- Born: Otto Eduard Leopold von Bismarck-Schönhausen; 1 April 1815 Schönhausen, Altmark, Prussia
- Died: 30 July 1898 (aged 83) Friedrichsruh, Schleswig-Holstein, Germany
- Resting place: Bismarck Mausoleum, Schleswig-Holstein, Germany; 53°31′38″N 10°20′9.96″E
- Party: Independent
- Spouse: Johanna von Puttkamer (m. 1847; died 1894)
- Children: 3, including Herbert and Wilhelm
- Education: University of Göttingen; University of Berlin; University of Greifswald
- Occupation: Politician; diplomat; author; farmer; official

Military service
- Allegiance: German Confederation; Kingdom of Prussia
- Branch/service: Prussian Army
- Years of service: 1838–1839
- Rank: Colonel General with the rank of Field Marshal
- Battles/wars: Second Schleswig War; Austro-Prussian War (1866); Franco-Prussian War (1870)
- Awards: Pour le Mérite with oak leaves
- Bismarck's voice Recorded 7 October 1889

Otto Eduard Leopold, Prince of Bismarck, Count of Bismarck-Schönhausen, Duke of Lauenburg (Note: German: Otto Eduard Leopold, Fürst von Bismarck, Graf von Bismarck-Schönhausen, Herzog zu Lauenburg, pronounced [ˈɔtoː fɔn ˈbɪsmaʁk]) (1 April 1815 – 30 July 1898), was a German statesman and diplomat who oversaw the unification of Germany and served as its first chancellor from 1871 to 1890. Bismarck's Realpolitik and firm governance earned him the nickname Iron Chancellor (Eiserner Kanzler).

From Junker landowner origins, Bismarck rose rapidly in Prussian politics under King Wilhelm I of Prussia. He served as the Prussian ambassador to Russia and France and in both houses of the Prussian parliament. From 1862 to 1890, he held office as the minister president and foreign minister of Prussia. Under Bismarck's leadership, Prussia provoked three short, decisive wars against Denmark, Austria, and France. After Austria's defeat in 1866, he replaced the German Confederation with the North German Confederation, which aligned the smaller North German states with Prussia while excluding Austria. In 1870, Bismarck secured France's defeat with support from the independent South German states before overseeing the creation of a unified German Empire under Prussian rule. Following Germany's unification, he was given the aristocratic title Prince of Bismarck (Fürst von Bismarck). From 1871 onwards, his balance-of-power approach to diplomacy helped maintain Germany's position in a peaceful Europe. While averse to maritime colonialism, Bismarck acquiesced to elite and popular opinion by acquiring German colonies.

As part of his domestic political maneuvering, Bismarck created the first welfare state, with the goal of undermining his socialist opponents. In the 1870s, he allied himself with the low-tariff, anti-Catholic Liberals and fought the Catholic Church, in what was called the Kulturkampf (lit. 'culture struggle'). This was unsuccessful, with the Catholics responding by forming the powerful German Centre Party and using universal male suffrage to gain a bloc of seats. Bismarck responded by ending the Kulturkampf, breaking with the Liberals and forming a political alliance with the Centre Party to fight the Socialists. Under his direction, the Imperial Reichstag was sidelined and did not control government policy. A staunch monarchist, Bismarck ruled autocratically through a strong bureaucracy with power concentrated in the hands of the Junker elite. After being dismissed from office by Wilhelm II, he retired to write his memoirs.

Bismarck is most famous for his role in German unification. During the German Imperial period, he became a hero to German nationalists, who built monuments honouring him. Historians have praised him as a brilliant statesman who established Germany as a great power and maintained peace in Europe for nearly two decades. However, his authoritarian rule, opposition to liberal democracy and repressive domestic policies have also drawn criticism.

== Early years ==
Bismarck was born in 1815 at Schönhausen, a noble family estate west of Berlin in Prussian Saxony. His father, Karl Wilhelm Ferdinand von Bismarck (1771–1845), was a Swabian-descendant Junker estate owner and a former Prussian military officer; his mother, Wilhelmine Luise Mencken (1789–1839), was the well-educated daughter of a senior government official in Berlin whose family produced many civil servants along with academics. In 1816, the family moved to its Pomeranian estate, Kniephof (now Konarzewo, Poland), northeast of Stettin (now Szczecin), in the then-Prussian province of Farther Pomerania. There, Bismarck spent his childhood in a bucolic setting. Despite the assets they held, their financial affairs were average; Ferdinand's below adequate agricultural skills led to a decreased salary, with Bismarck having never obtained any significant wealth before unification, given the lack of such received from his father.

Bismarck had two siblings: his older brother Bernhard (1810–1893) and his younger sister Malwine (1827–1908). Others saw Bismarck as a typical backwoods Prussian Junker, an image that he encouraged by wearing military uniforms. However, he was well educated and cosmopolitan with a gift for conversation. Bismarck also knew English, French, Italian, Polish, and Russian.

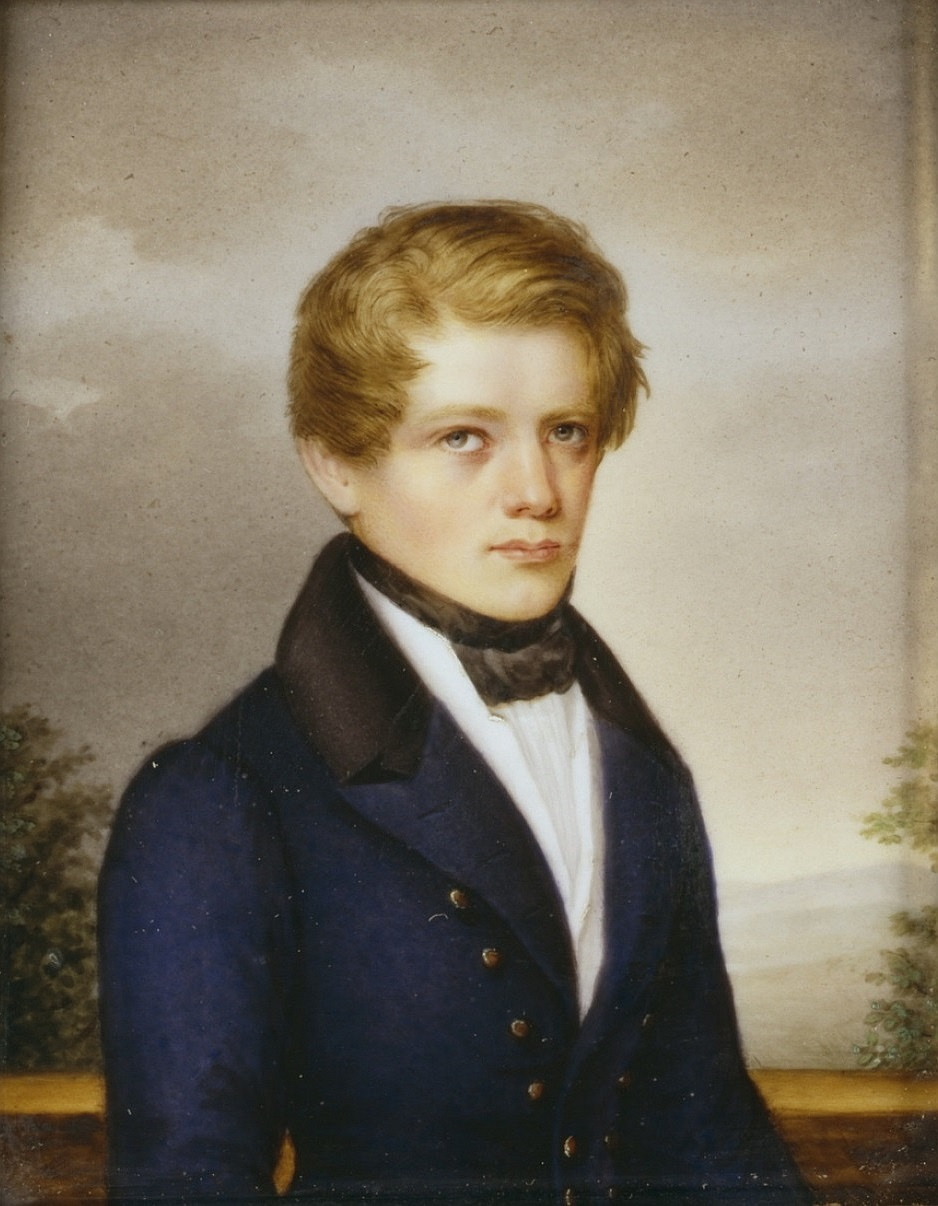
Bismarck in 1833, at age 18

Bismarck was educated at Johann Ernst Plamann's elementary school, and the Friedrich-Wilhelm and Graues Kloster secondary schools. From 1832 to 1833, he studied law at the University of Göttingen, where he was a member of the Corps Hannovera, and then enrolled at the University of Berlin (1833–1835). In 1838, while stationed as an army reservist in Greifswald, he studied agriculture at the University of Greifswald. At Göttingen, Bismarck befriended the American student John Lothrop Motley. Motley, who later became an eminent historian and diplomat while remaining close to Bismarck, wrote a novel in 1839, Morton's Hope, or the Memoirs of a Provincial, about life in a German university. In it he described Bismarck as a reckless and dashing eccentric, but also as an extremely gifted and charming young man.

Although Bismarck hoped to become a diplomat, he started his practical training as a lawyer in Aachen and Potsdam, and soon resigned, having first placed his career in jeopardy by taking unauthorised leave to pursue two English girls: first Laura Russell, niece of the Duke of Cleveland, and then Isabella Loraine-Smith, daughter of a wealthy clergyman. In 1838, Bismarck began a shortened compulsory military service in the Prussian Army; actively serving as a one-year volunteer before becoming an officer in the Landwehr (reserve). Afterwards he returned to run the family estates at Schönhausen on his mother's death in his mid-twenties.

Around age 30, Bismarck formed an intense friendship with Marie von Thadden-Trieglaff, newly married to one of his friends, Moritz von Blanckenburg. A month after her death, Bismarck wrote to ask for the hand in marriage of Marie's cousin, the noblewoman Johanna von Puttkamer (1824–1894); they were married at Alt-Kolziglow (modern Kołczygłowy) on 28 July 1847. Their marriage produced three children: Marie (b. 1847), Herbert (b. 1849), and Wilhelm (b. 1852). Johanna was a shy, retiring and deeply religious woman, although famed for her sharp tongue in later life.

== Early political career ==
=== Young politician ===
In 1847, Bismarck, aged thirty-two, was chosen as a representative to the newly created Prussian legislature, the Vereinigter Landtag. There, he gained a reputation as a royalist and reactionary politician with a gift for stinging rhetoric; he openly advocated the idea that the monarch had a divine right to rule. Two brothers, Ernst Ludwig and Leopold von Gerlach, fellow Pietist Lutherans whose ultra-conservative faction was known as the "Kreuzzeitung" — after their newspaper, the Neue Preußische Zeitung, so nicknamed because it featured an Iron Cross on its cover — arranged his selection.

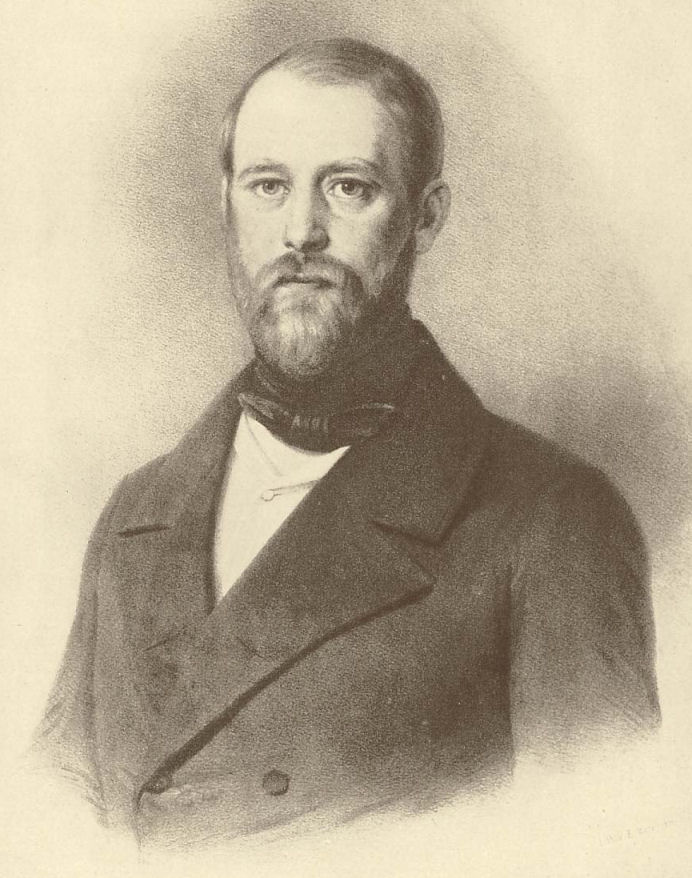
Bismarck in 1847, at age 32

In March 1848, Prussia faced a revolution (one of the revolutions of 1848 across Europe), which completely overwhelmed King Frederick William IV. The monarch, though initially inclined to use armed forces to suppress the rebellion, ultimately declined to leave Berlin for the safety of military headquarters at Potsdam. Bismarck later recorded that there had been a "rattling of sabres in their scabbards" from Prussian officers when they learned that the king would not suppress the revolution by force. He offered numerous concessions to the liberals: he wore the black-red-gold revolutionary colours (as seen on the flag of today's Germany), promised to promulgate a constitution, agreed that Prussia and other German states should merge into a single nation-state, and appointed a liberal, Gottfried Ludolf Camphausen, as Minister President.

Bismarck had at first tried to rouse the peasants of his estate into an army to march on Berlin in the king's name. He travelled to Berlin in disguise to offer his services but was instead told to make himself useful by arranging food supplies for the Army from his estates in case they were needed. The king's brother, Prince Wilhelm, had fled to England; Bismarck tried to get Wilhelm's wife Augusta to place their teenage son Frederick William on the Prussian throne in Frederick William IV's place. Augusta would have none of it, and detested Bismarck thereafter, despite the fact that he later helped restore a working relationship between Wilhelm and his brother the king. Bismarck was not yet a member of the House of Representatives, the lower house of the new Prussian legislature. The liberal movement perished by the end of 1848 amid internal fighting. Meanwhile, the conservatives regrouped, formed an inner group of advisers—including the Gerlach brothers, known as the "Camarilla"—around the king, and retook control of Berlin. Although a constitution was granted, its provisions fell far short of the demands of the revolutionaries.

In 1849, Bismarck was elected to the Landtag. At this stage in his career, he opposed the unification of Germany, arguing that Prussia would lose its independence in the process. He accepted his appointment as one of Prussia's representatives at the Erfurt Parliament, an assembly of German states that met to discuss plans for union, but he only did so to oppose that body's proposals more effectively. The parliament failed to bring about unification, for it lacked the support of the two most important German states, Prussia and Austria. In September 1850, after a dispute over the Electorate of Hesse (the Hesse Crisis of 1850), Prussia was humiliated and forced to back down by Austria (supported by Russia) in the so-called Punctation of Olmütz; a plan for the unification of Germany under Prussian leadership, proposed by Prussia's Foreign Minister Joseph von Radowitz, was also abandoned.

The German Confederation 1815–1866. Prussia (in blue) considerably expanded its territory.

In 1851, Frederick William IV appointed Bismarck as Prussia's envoy to the Diet of the German Confederation in Frankfurt. Bismarck gave up his elected seat in the Landtag but was appointed to the Prussian House of Lords a few years later. In Frankfurt, he engaged in a battle of wills with the Austrian representative Count Friedrich von Thun und Hohenstein. He insisted on being treated as an equal by petty tactics such as imitating Thun when Thun claimed the privileges of smoking and removing his jacket in meetings. This episode was the background for an altercation in the Frankfurt chamber with Georg von Vincke that led to a duel between Bismarck and Vincke with Carl von Bodelschwingh as an impartial party, which ended without injury.

Bismarck's eight years in Frankfurt were marked by changes in his political opinions, detailed in the numerous lengthy memoranda, which he sent to his ministerial superiors in Berlin. No longer under the influence of his ultraconservative Prussian friends, Bismarck became less reactionary and more pragmatic. He became convinced that to countervail Austria's newly restored influence, Prussia would have to ally herself with other German states. As a result, he grew to be more accepting of the notion of a united German nation. He gradually came to believe that he and his fellow conservatives had to take the lead in creating a unified nation to keep from being eclipsed. He also believed that the middle-class liberals wanted a unified Germany more than they wanted to break the grip of the traditional forces over society.

Bismarck also worked to maintain the friendship of Russia and a working relationship with Napoleon III's France, the latter being anathema to his conservative friends, the Gerlachs, (Note: See quotations from letters between Leopold von Gerlach and Bismarck debating the topic of Napoleon III.) but necessary both to threaten Austria and to prevent France from allying with Russia. In a famous letter to Leopold von Gerlach, Bismarck wrote that it was foolish to play chess having first put 16 of the 64 squares out of bounds. This observation became ironic, as after 1871, France indeed became Germany's permanent enemy, and eventually allied with Russia against Germany in the 1890s.

Bismarck was alarmed by Prussia's isolation during the Crimean War of the mid-1850s, in which Austria sided with Britain and France against Russia; Prussia was almost not invited to the peace talks in Paris, where Russia notably regained access to the Black Sea, much to his chagrin. In the Great Eastern Crisis of the 1870s, fear of a repetition of this turn of events would later be a factor in Bismarck's signing the Dual Alliance with Austria-Hungary in 1879.

=== Ambassador to Russia and France ===
In October 1857, Frederick William IV suffered a paralysing stroke, and his brother Wilhelm took over the Prussian government as Regent. Wilhelm was initially seen as a moderate ruler, whose friendship with liberal Britain was symbolised by the recent marriage of his son Frederick William to Queen Victoria's eldest daughter. As part of his "New Era", Wilhelm brought in new ministers, moderate conservatives known as the Wochenblatt after their newspaper.

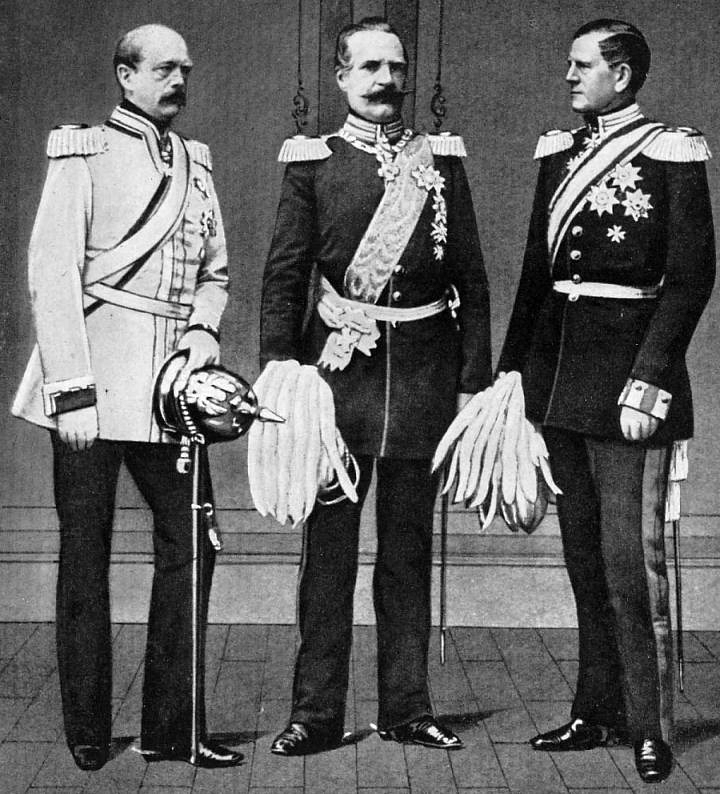
Bismarck in 1863 with Roon (centre) and Moltke (right), the three leaders of Prussia in the 1860s

The Regent soon replaced Bismarck as envoy in Frankfurt and made him Prussia's ambassador to the Russian Empire. In theory, this was a promotion, as Russia was one of Prussia's two most powerful neighbours. But Bismarck was sidelined from events in Germany and could only watch impotently as France drove Austria out of Lombardy during the Italian War of 1859. Bismarck proposed that Prussia should exploit Austria's weakness to move her frontiers "as far south as Lake Constance" on the Swiss border; instead, Prussia mobilised troops in the Rhineland to deter further French advances into Venetia.

Bismarck stayed in St Petersburg for four years, during which he almost lost his leg to botched medical treatment and once again met his future adversary, the Russian Prince Alexander Gorchakov, who had been the Russian representative in Frankfurt in the early 1850s. The Regent also appointed Helmuth von Moltke as the new Chief of Staff of the Prussian Army, and Albrecht von Roon as Minister of War with the job of reorganising the army. Over the next twelve years, Bismarck, Moltke and Roon transformed Prussia.

Despite his lengthy stay abroad, Bismarck was not entirely detached from German domestic affairs. He remained well-informed due to Roon, with whom Bismarck formed a lasting friendship and political alliance. In May 1862, he was sent to Paris to serve as ambassador to France, and also visited England that summer. These visits enabled him to meet and take the measure of several adversaries: Napoleon III in France, and in Britain, Prime Minister Palmerston, Foreign Secretary Earl Russell, and Conservative politician Benjamin Disraeli.

== Minister President of Prussia ==
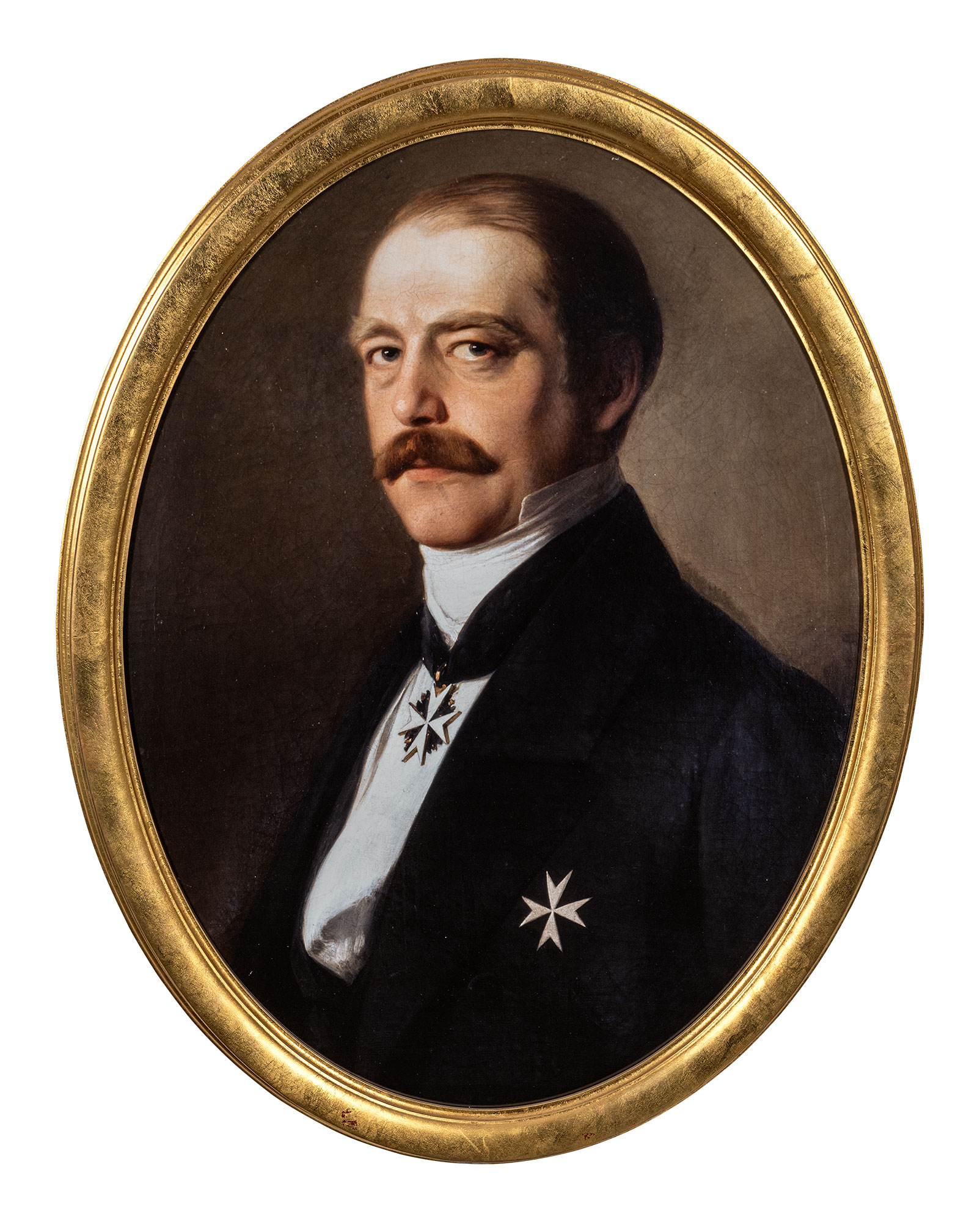
Otto von Bismarck as Minister President of Prussia, shown wearing insignia of a knight of the Johanniterorden, 1858

Prince Wilhelm became King of Prussia upon his brother Frederick Wilhelm IV's death in 1861. The new monarch often came into conflict with the increasingly liberal Prussian Landtag. A crisis arose in 1862 when the Landtag refused to authorise funding for a proposed re-organisation of the army. The King's ministers could not convince legislators to pass the budget, and the king was unwilling to make concessions. Wilhelm threatened to abdicate in favour of his son Crown Prince Frederick William, who opposed his doing so, believing that Bismarck was the only politician capable of handling the crisis. However, Wilhelm was ambivalent about appointing a person who demanded unfettered control over foreign affairs. It was in September 1862, when the Abgeordnetenhaus (House of Representatives) overwhelmingly rejected the proposed budget, that Wilhelm was persuaded to recall Bismarck to Prussia on the advice of Roon. On 23 September 1862, Wilhelm appointed Bismarck Minister President and Foreign Minister.

Bismarck, Roon and Moltke took charge at a time when relations among the Great Powers (Great Britain, France, Austria and Russia) had been shattered by the Crimean War and the First Italian War of Independence. In the midst of this disarray, the European balance of power was restructured with the creation of the German Empire as the dominant power in continental Europe apart from Russia. This was achieved by Bismarck's diplomacy, Roon's reorganisation of the army and Moltke's military strategy.

Despite the initial distrust of the king and crown prince and the loathing of Queen Augusta, Bismarck soon acquired a powerful hold over the king by force of personality and powers of persuasion. Bismarck was intent on maintaining royal supremacy by ending the budget deadlock in the king's favour, even if he had to use extra-legal means to do so. Under the constitution, the budget could be passed only after the king and legislature agreed on its terms. Bismarck contended that since the constitution did not provide for cases in which legislators failed to approve a budget, there was a "legal loophole" in the constitution and so he could apply the previous year's budget to keep the government running. Thus, on the basis of the 1861 budget, tax collection continued for four years.

Bismarck's conflict with the legislators intensified in the coming years. Following the Alvensleben Convention of 1863, the House of Representatives resolved that it could no longer come to terms with Bismarck; in response, the king dissolved the Landtag, accusing it of trying to obtain unconstitutional control over the ministry—which, under the constitution, was responsible solely to the king. Bismarck then issued an edict restricting the freedom of the press, an edict that even gained the public opposition of the crown prince. Despite (or perhaps because of) his attempts to silence critics, Bismarck remained a largely unpopular politician. His supporters fared poorly in the elections of October 1863, in which a liberal coalition, whose primary member was the Progress Party, won over two-thirds of the seats. The House made repeated calls for Bismarck to be dismissed, but the king supported him, fearing that if he did dismiss the Minister President, he would most likely be succeeded by a liberal.

=== Blood and Iron speech ===
German unification had been a major objective of the revolutions of 1848, when representatives of the German states met in Frankfurt and drafted a constitution, creating a federal union with a national parliament to be elected by universal male suffrage. In April 1849, the Frankfurt Parliament offered the title of Emperor to King Frederick William IV. Fearing the opposition of the other German princes and the military intervention of Austria and Russia, the king renounced this popular mandate, citing his concerns over the legitimacy of the parliament to offer him the crown without the consent of the various German rulers. Thus, the Frankfurt Parliament ended in failure for the German liberals. On 30 September 1862, Bismarck made a famous speech to the Budget Committee of the Prussian Chamber of Deputies in which he expounded on the use of "iron and blood" to achieve Prussia's goals:

Prussia must concentrate and maintain its power for the favorable moment which has already slipped by several times. Prussia's boundaries according to the Vienna treaties are not favorable to a healthy state life. The great questions of the time will not be resolved by speeches and majority decisions – that was the great mistake of 1848 and 1849 – but by iron and blood.

=== Defeat of Denmark ===
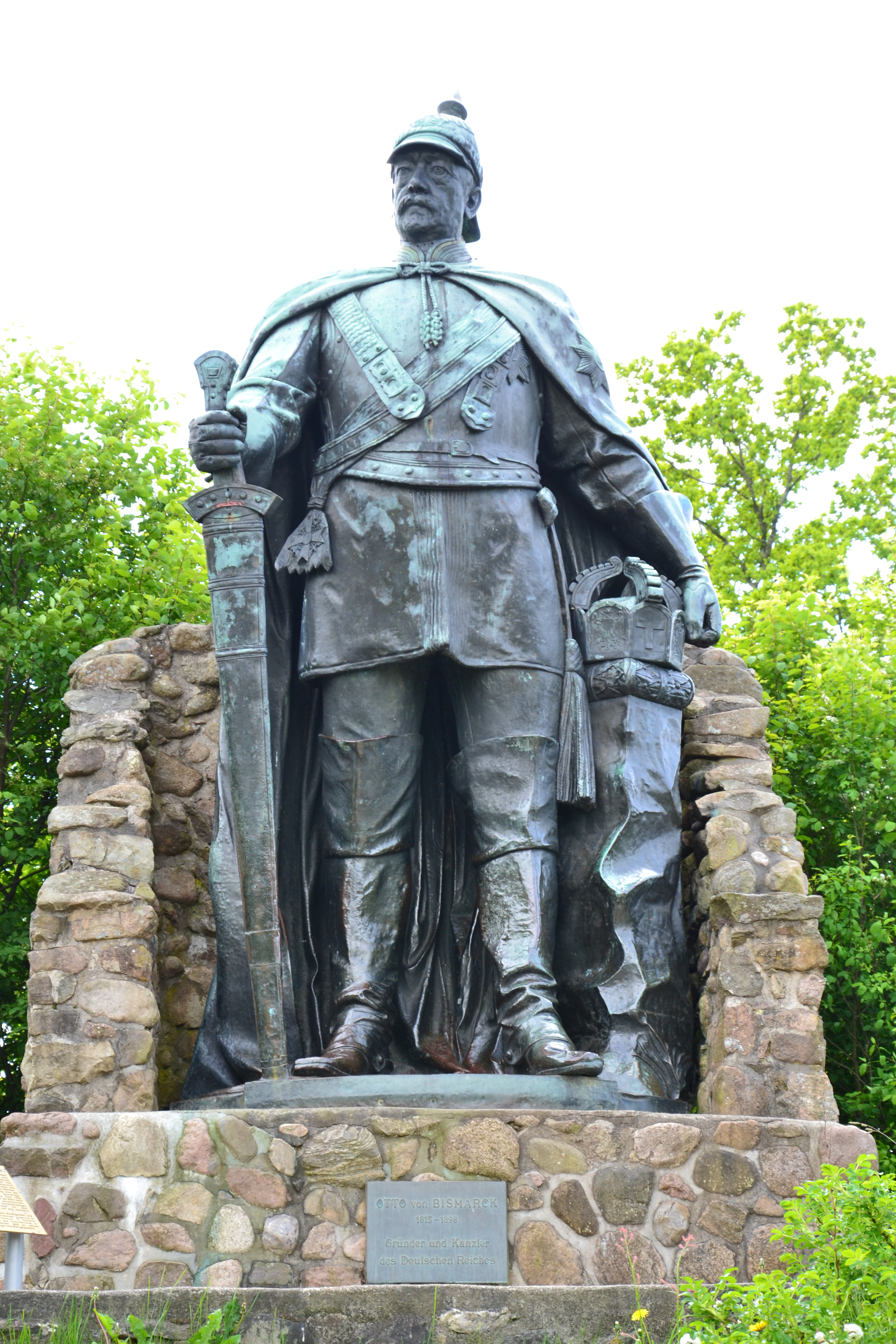
Statue of Otto von Bismarck in the northernmost German state of Schleswig-Holstein

Prior to the 1860s, Germany consisted of a multitude of principalities loosely bound together as members of the German Confederation. Bismarck used both diplomacy and the Prussian military to achieve unification, excluding Austria from a unified Germany. This made Prussia the most powerful and dominant component of the new Germany but also ensured that it remained an authoritarian state and not a liberal parliamentary democracy.

Bismarck faced a diplomatic crisis when King Frederick VII of Denmark died in November 1863. The succession to the duchies of Schleswig and Holstein was disputed; they were claimed by Christian IX, Frederick VII's heir as king, and also by Frederick von Augustenburg, a Danish duke. Prussian public opinion strongly favoured Augustenburg's claim, as the populations of Holstein and southern Schleswig were primarily German-speaking. Bismarck took an unpopular step by insisting that the territories legally belonged to the Danish monarch under the London Protocol signed a decade earlier. Nonetheless, Bismarck denounced Christian's decision to completely annex Schleswig to Denmark. With support from Austria, he issued an ultimatum for Christian IX to return Schleswig to its former status. When Denmark refused, Austria and Prussia invaded, sparking the Second Schleswig War. Denmark was ultimately forced to renounce its claim on both duchies.

At first this seemed like a victory for Augustenburg, but Bismarck soon removed him from power by making a series of unworkable demands, namely that Prussia should have control over the army and navy of the duchies. Originally, it had been proposed that the Diet of the German Confederation, in which all the states of Germany were represented, should determine the fate of the duchies; but before this scheme could be effected, Bismarck induced Austria to agree to the Gastein Convention. Under this agreement signed on 20 August 1865, Prussia received Schleswig, while Austria received Holstein. In that year Bismarck was given the title of Count (Graf) of Bismarck-Schönhausen.

=== Defeat of Austria ===
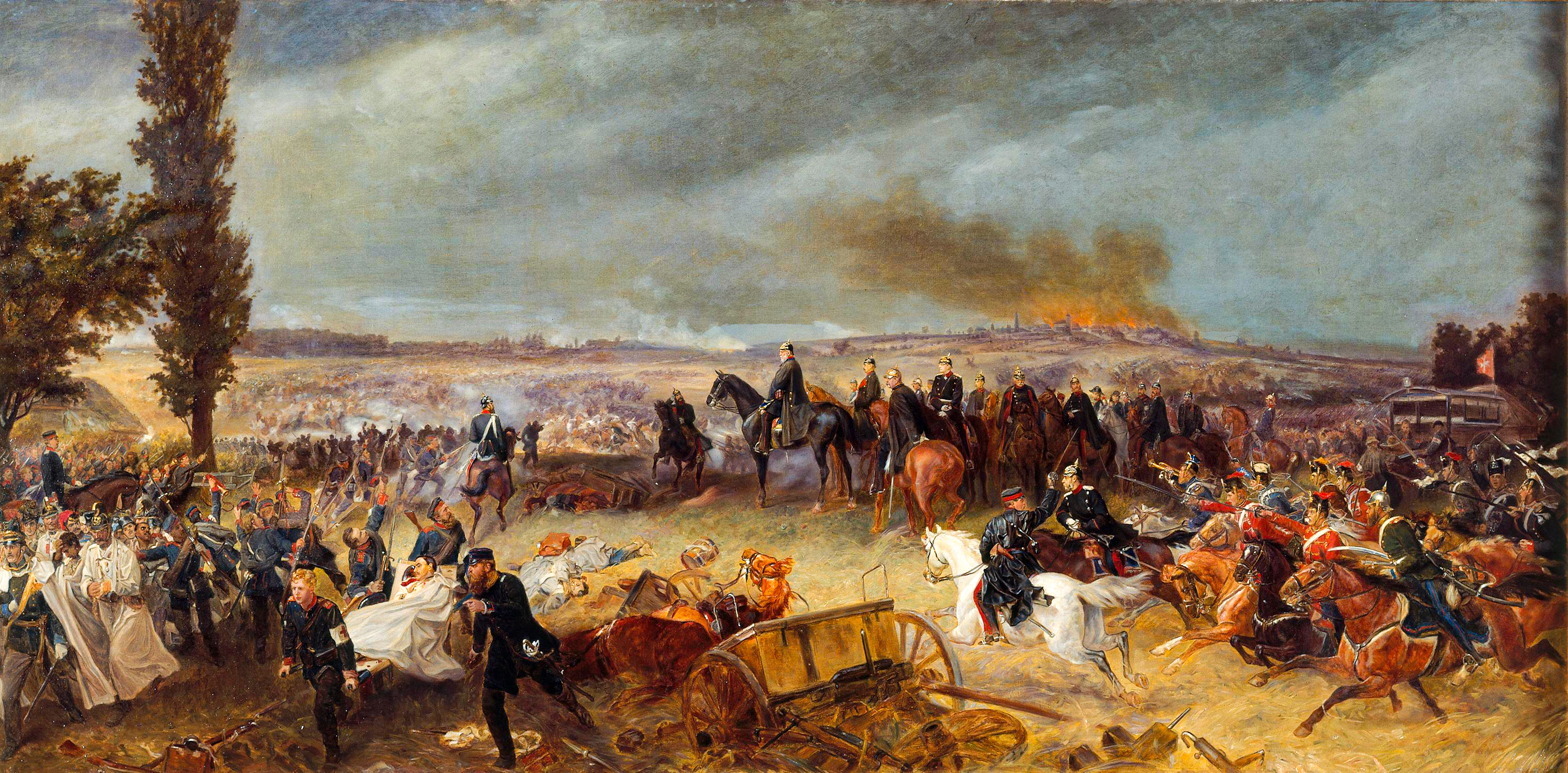
King William on a black horse with his suite, Bismarck, Moltke, Roon and others, watching the Battle of Königgrätz

In 1866, Austria reneged on the agreement and demanded that the Diet determine the Schleswig–Holstein issue. Bismarck used this as an excuse to start a war with Austria by accusing them of violating the Gastein Convention. Bismarck sent Prussian troops to occupy Holstein. Provoked, Austria called for the aid of other German states, who quickly became involved in the Austro-Prussian War. Thanks to Roon's reorganization, the Prussian Army was nearly equal in numbers to the Austrian Army. With the strategic genius of Moltke, the Prussian army fought battles it was able to win. Bismarck had also made a secret alliance with Italy, who desired Austrian-controlled Veneto. Italy's entry into the war forced the Austrians to divide their forces.

Meanwhile, as the war began, a German radical named Ferdinand Cohen-Blind attempted to assassinate Bismarck in Berlin, shooting him five times at close range. Bismarck had only minor injuries. Cohen-Blind later committed suicide while in custody.

The war lasted seven weeks. Austria had a seemingly powerful army that was allied with most of the north German and all of the south German states. Nevertheless, Prussia won the decisive Battle of Königgrätz. The king and his generals wanted to push onward, conquer Bohemia and march to Vienna, but Bismarck, worried that Prussian military luck might change or that France might intervene on Austria's side, enlisted the help of Crown Prince Frederick Wilhelm, who had opposed the war but had commanded one of the Prussian armies at Königgrätz, to dissuade his father after stormy arguments. Bismarck insisted on a "soft peace" with no annexations and no victory parades, so as to be able to quickly restore friendly relations with Austria.

Prussia had only a plurality (17 out of 43 seats) in the Bundesrat despite being larger than the other 21 states combined, but Bismarck could easily control the proceedings through alliances with the smaller states. This began what historians refer to as "The Misery of Austria" in which Austria served as a mere vassal to the superior Germany, a relationship that was to shape history until the end of the First World War.

Jonathan Steinberg says of Bismarck's achievements to this point:

The scale of Bismarck's triumph cannot be exaggerated. He alone had brought about a complete transformation of the European international order. He had told those who would listen what he intended to do, how he intended to do it, and he did it. He achieved this incredible feat without commanding an army, and without the ability to give an order to the humblest common soldier, without control of a large party, without public support, indeed, in the face of almost universal hostility, without a majority in parliament, without control of his cabinet, and without a loyal following in the bureaucracy. He no longer had the support of the powerful conservative interest groups who had helped him achieve power. The most senior diplomats in the foreign service ... were sworn enemies and he knew it. The Queen and the Royal Family hated him and the King, emotional and unreliable, would soon have his 70th birthday. ... With perfect justice, in August 1866, he punched his fist on his desk and cried "I have beaten them all! All!"

=== Franco-Prussian War 1870–1871 ===
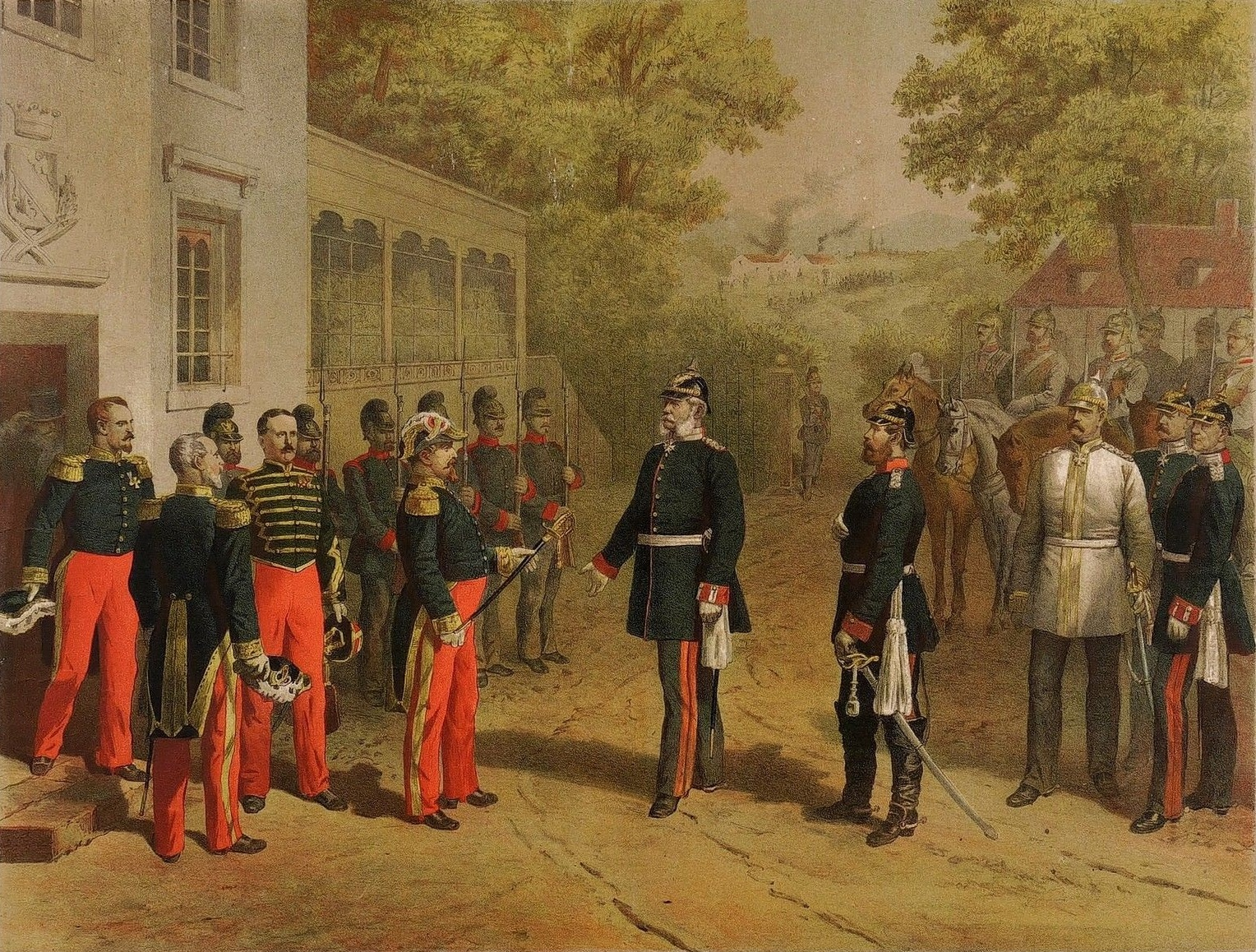
Surrender of Napoleon III after the Battle of Sedan, 1 September 1870

Prussia's victory over Austria increased the already existing tensions with France. The Emperor of France, Napoleon III, had tried to gain territory for France (in Belgium and on the left bank of the Rhine) as a compensation for not joining the war against Prussia and was disappointed by the surprisingly quick outcome of the war. Accordingly, opposition politician Adolphe Thiers claimed that it was France, not Austria, who had really been defeated at Königgrätz. Bismarck, at the same time, did not avoid war with France, though he feared the French for a number of reasons. First, he feared that Austria, hungry for revenge, would ally with the French. Similarly, he feared that the Russian army would assist France to maintain a balance of power. Still, however, Bismarck believed that if the German states perceived France as the aggressor, they would then unite behind the King of Prussia. To achieve this, he kept Napoleon III involved in various intrigues, whereby France might gain territory from Luxembourg or Belgium. France never achieved any such gain, but it was made to look greedy and untrustworthy.

A suitable pretext for war arose in 1870 when the German Prince Leopold of Hohenzollern-Sigmaringen was offered the Spanish throne, vacant since a revolution in 1868. France pressured Leopold into withdrawing his candidacy. Not content with this, Paris demanded that Wilhelm, as head of the House of Hohenzollern, assure that no Hohenzollern would ever seek the Spanish crown again. To provoke France into declaring war with Prussia, Bismarck published the Ems Dispatch, a carefully edited version of a conversation between King Wilhelm and the French ambassador to Prussia, Count Benedetti. This conversation had been edited so that each nation felt that its ambassador had been slighted and ridiculed, thus inflaming popular sentiment on both sides in favour of war. Langer, however, argues that this episode played a minor role in causing the war.

Bismarck wrote in his Memoirs that he "had no doubt that a Franco-German war must take place before the construction of a united Germany could be realised". Yet he felt confident that the French Army was not prepared to give battle to Germany's numerically larger forces: "If the French fight us alone they are lost". He was also convinced that the French would not be able to find allies since "France, the victor, would be a danger to everybody – Prussia to nobody". He added, "That is our strong point".

France mobilized and declared war on 19 July. The German states saw France as the aggressor, and—swept up by nationalism and patriotic zeal—they rallied to Prussia's side and provided troops. Both of Bismarck's sons served as officers in the Prussian cavalry. The war was a great success for Prussia as the German army, controlled by Chief of Staff Moltke, won victory after victory. The major battles were all fought in one month (7 August to 1 September), and both French armies were captured at Sedan and Metz, the latter after a siege of some weeks. Napoleon III was taken prisoner at Sedan and kept in Germany for a time in case Bismarck had need of him to head the French regime; he later died in exile in England in 1873. The remainder of the war featured a Siege of Paris, the city was "ineffectually bombarded"; the new French republican regime then tried, without success, to relieve Paris with various hastily assembled armies and increasingly bitter partisan warfare.

Bismarck quoted the first verse lyrics of "La Marseillaise", amongst others, when being recorded on an Edison phonograph in 1889, the only known recording of his voice. A biographer stated that he did so, 19 years after the war, to mock the French.

=== Unification of Germany ===
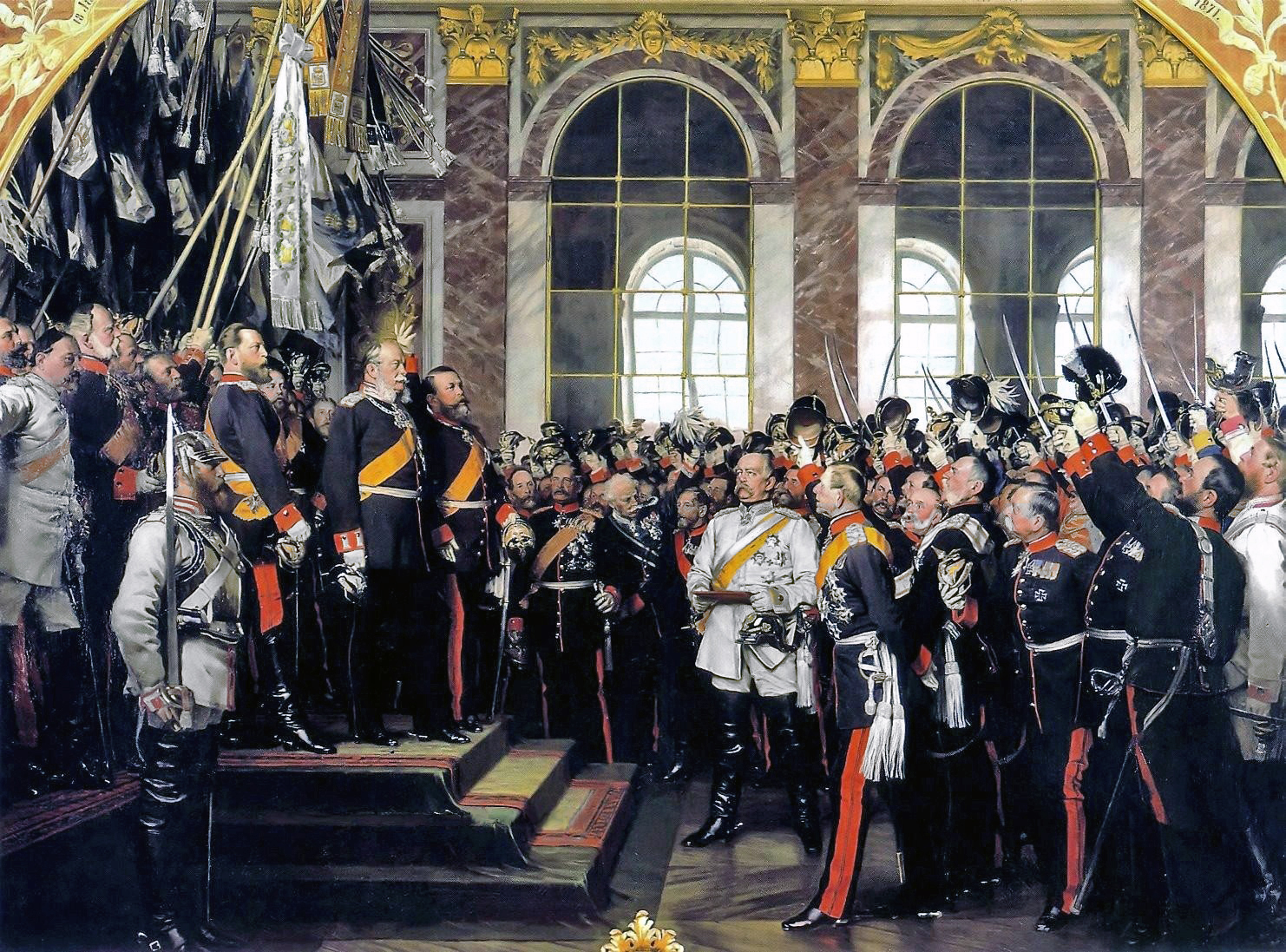
Anton von Werner's patriotic, much-reproduced depiction of the proclamation of Wilhelm I as German emperor in the Hall of Mirrors at Versailles. Bismarck is in the centre, wearing a white uniform (1885).

Bismarck acted immediately to secure the unification of Germany. He negotiated with representatives of the southern German states, offering special concessions if they agreed to unification. The negotiations succeeded; patriotic sentiment overwhelmed what opposition remained. While the war was in its final phase, Wilhelm I of Prussia was proclaimed German Emperor on 18 January 1871 in the Hall of Mirrors in the Château de Versailles. The new German Empire was a federation: each of its 25 constituent states (kingdoms, grand duchies, duchies, principalities, and free cities) retained some autonomy. The King of Prussia, as German Emperor, was not sovereign over the entirety of Germany; he was only primus inter pares, or first among equals. However, he held the presidency of the Bundesrat, which met to discuss policy presented by the Chancellor, whom the emperor appointed.

In the end, France had to cede Alsace and part of Lorraine, as Moltke and his generals wanted it as a buffer. Historians debate whether Bismarck wanted this annexation or was forced into it by a wave of German public and elite opinion. France was also required to pay an indemnity; the indemnity figure was calculated on the basis of population, as the precise equivalent of the indemnity that Napoleon I had imposed on Prussia in 1807.

Historians debate whether Bismarck had a master plan to expand the North German Confederation of 1866 to include the remaining independent German states into a single entity or simply to expand the power of the Kingdom of Prussia. They conclude that factors in addition to the strength of Bismarck's Realpolitik led a collection of early modern polities to reorganise political, economic, military, and diplomatic relationships in the 19th century. Reaction to Danish and French nationalism provided foci for expressions of German unity. Military successes—especially those of Prussia—in three regional wars generated enthusiasm and pride that politicians could harness to promote unification. This experience echoed the memory of mutual accomplishment in the Napoleonic Wars, particularly in the War of Liberation of 1813–1814. By establishing a Germany without Austria, the political and administrative unification in 1871 at least temporarily solved the problem of dualism. Historian Robert K. Massie has noted Bismarck's popular image was as "gruff" and "militaristic", while in reality "Bismarck's tool was aggressive, ruthless diplomacy."

Jonathan Steinberg said of Bismarck's creation of the German Empire that:

the first phase of [his] great career had been concluded. The genius-statesmen had transformed European politics and had unified Germany in eight and a half years. And he had done so by sheer force of personality, by his brilliance, ruthlessness, and flexibility of principle. ... [It] marked the high point of [his] career. He had achieved the impossible, and his genius and the cult of genius had no limits. ... When he returned to Berlin in March 1871, he had become immortal ...

== Chancellor of the German Empire ==
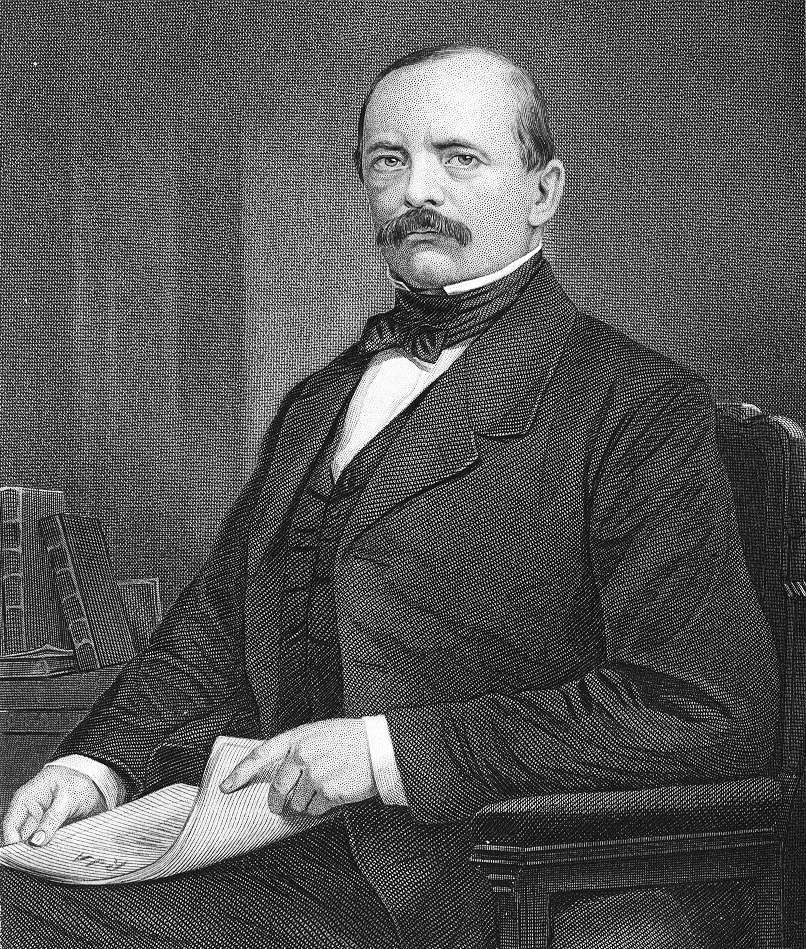
Bismarck in 1873

In 1871, Bismarck was raised to the rank of Fürst (Prince). He was also appointed as the first Imperial Chancellor (Reichskanzler) of the German Empire but retained his Prussian offices, including those of Minister-President and Foreign Minister. He was also promoted to the rank of lieutenant-general and bought a former hotel in Friedrichsruh near Hamburg, which became an estate. He also continued to serve as his own foreign minister. Because of both the imperial and the Prussian offices that he held, Bismarck had nearly complete control over domestic and foreign policy. The office of Minister President of Prussia was temporarily separated from that of Chancellor in 1873, when Albrecht von Roon was appointed to the former office. But by the end of the year, Roon resigned due to ill health, and Bismarck again became Minister-President.

=== Kulturkampf ===
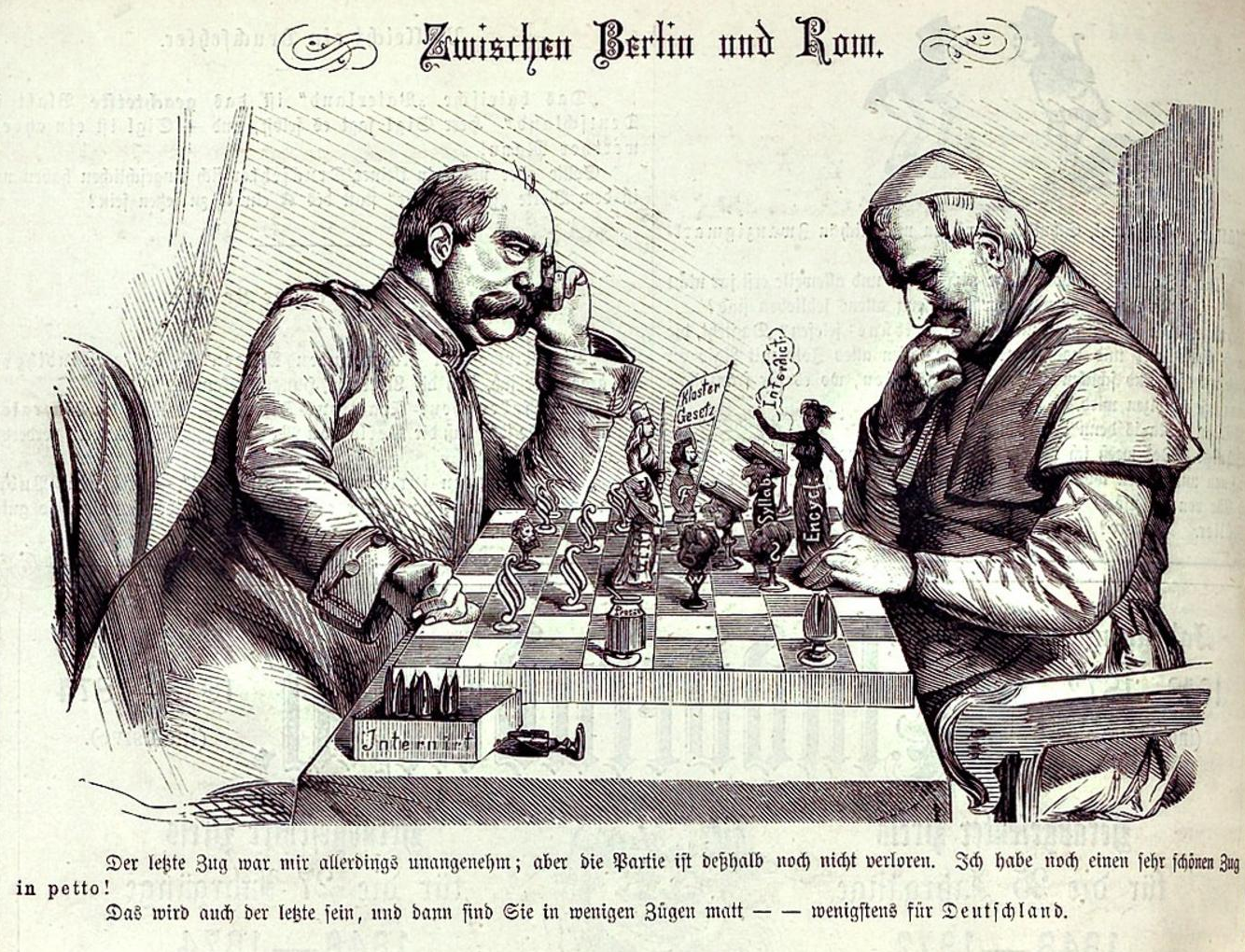
Between Berlin and Rome, Bismarck confronts Pope Pius IX, 1875.

Bismarck launched an anti-Catholic Kulturkampf ("culture struggle") in Prussia in 1871. This was partly motivated by Bismarck's fear that Pius IX and his successors would use papal infallibility to achieve the "papal desire for international political hegemony.... The result was the Kulturkampf, which, with its largely Prussian measures, complemented by similar actions in several other German states, sought to curb the clerical danger by legislation restricting the Catholic church's political power." In May 1872 Bismarck thus attempted to reach an understanding with other European governments to manipulate future Papal conclaves; governments should agree beforehand on unsuitable candidates, and then instruct their national cardinals to vote appropriately. The goal was to end the pope's control over the bishops in a given state, but the project went nowhere.

Bismarck accelerated the Kulturkampf. In its course, all Prussian bishops and many priests were imprisoned or exiled. Prussia's population had greatly expanded in the 1860s and was now one-third Catholic. Bismarck believed that the pope and bishops held too much power over the German Catholics and was further concerned about the emergence of the Catholic Centre Party, organised in 1870. With support from the anticlerical National Liberal Party, which had become Bismarck's chief ally in the Reichstag, he abolished the Catholic Department of the Prussian Ministry of Culture. That left the Catholics without a voice in high circles. The 1871 Pulpit Law also made certain political statements by clergy of any denomination punishable by imprisonment. Moreover, in 1872, the Jesuits were expelled from Germany. In 1873, more anti-Catholic laws allowed the Prussian government to supervise the education of the Roman Catholic clergy and curtailed the disciplinary powers of the Church. Further Prussian measures in 1875 suspended state payments to Catholic dioceses and clergy, banned most Catholic religious orders and increased surveillance of Catholic associations and publications. In 1875, civil ceremonies were required for civil weddings. Hitherto, weddings in churches were civilly recognised.

Kulturkampf became part of Bismarck's foreign policy, as he sought to destabilise and weaken Catholic regimes, especially in Belgium and France, but he had little success.

The British ambassador Odo Russell reported to London in October 1872 that Bismarck's plans were backfiring by strengthening the ultramontane (pro-papal) position inside German Catholicism: "The German Bishops, who were politically powerless in Germany and theologically in opposition to the Pope in Rome, have now become powerful political leaders in Germany and enthusiastic defenders of the now infallible Faith of Rome, united, disciplined, and thirsting for martyrdom, thanks to Bismarck's uncalled for antiliberal declaration of War on the freedom they had hitherto peacefully enjoyed."

The Catholics reacted by organising themselves and strengthening the Centre Party. Bismarck, a devout pietistic Protestant, was alarmed that secularists and socialists were using the Kulturkampf to attack all religions. He abandoned it in 1878 to preserve his remaining political capital since he now needed the Centre Party votes in his new battle against socialism. Pius IX died that year, replaced by the more pragmatic Pope Leo XIII who negotiated away most of the anti-Catholic laws. The Pope kept control of the selection of bishops, and Catholics for the most part supported unification and most of Bismarck's policies. However, they never forgot his culture war and preached solidarity to present organised resistance should it ever be resumed.

Steinberg comments:

The anti-Catholic hysteria in many European countries belongs in its European setting. Bismarck's campaign was not unique in itself, but his violent temper, intolerance of opposition, and paranoia that secret forces had conspired to undermine his life's work, made it more relentless. His rage drove him to exaggerate the threat from Catholic activities and to respond with very extreme measures. ... As Odo Russell wrote to his mother, [Lady Emily Russell,] "The demonic is stronger in him than in any man I know." ... The bully, the dictator, and the "demonic" combined in him with the self-pity and the hypochondria to create a constant crisis of authority, which he exploited for his own ends. ... Opponents, friends, and subordinates all remarked on Bismarck as "demonic", a kind of uncanny, diabolic personal power over men and affairs. In these years of his greatest power, he believed that he could do anything.

=== Economy ===
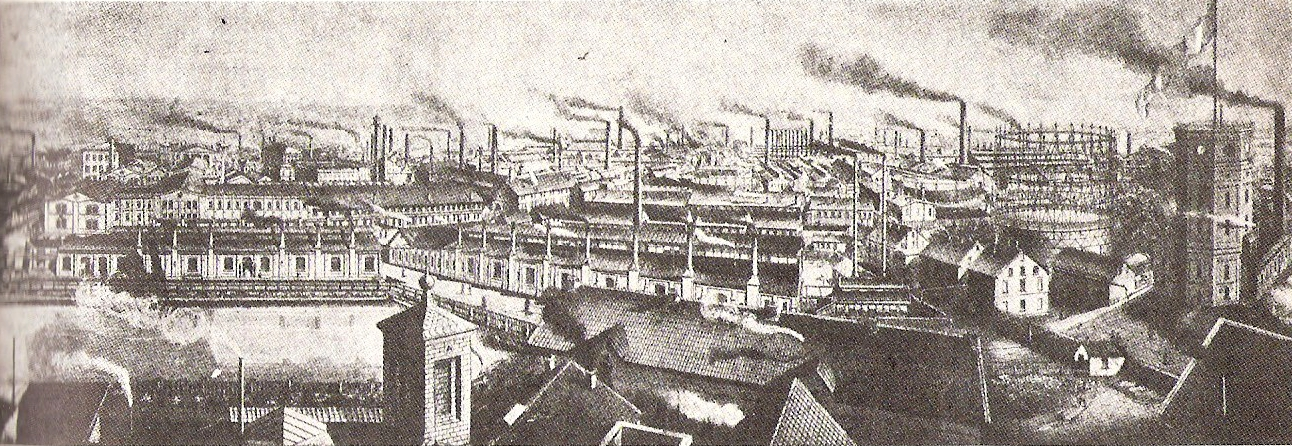
The Krupp factory in Essen, 1880

In 1873, Germany and much of Europe and America entered the Long Depression, the Gründerkrise. A downturn hit the German economy for the first time since industrial development began to surge in the 1850s. To aid faltering industries, the Chancellor abandoned free trade and established protectionist import-tariffs, which alienated the National Liberals who demanded free trade. The Kulturkampf and its effects had also stirred up public opinion against the party that supported it, and Bismarck used this opportunity to distance himself from the National Liberals. That marked a rapid decline in the support of the National Liberals, and by 1879 their close ties with Bismarck had all but ended. Bismarck instead returned to conservative factions, including the Centre Party, for support. He helped foster support from the conservatives by enacting several tariffs protecting German agriculture and industry from foreign competitors in 1879.

=== Germanisation ===
Imperial and provincial government bureaucracies attempted to Germanise the state's national minorities situated near the borders of the empire: the Danes in the north, the French-speaking population of Alsace-Lorraine in the west and Poles in the east. As minister president of Prussia and as imperial chancellor, Bismarck "sorted people into their linguistic [and religious] 'tribes'"; he pursued a policy of hostility in particular toward the Poles, which was an expedient rooted in Prussian history. "He never had a Pole among his peasants" working the Bismarckian estates; it was the educated Polish bourgeoisie and revolutionaries he denounced from personal experience, and "because of them he disliked intellectuals in politics." Bismarck's antagonism is revealed in a private letter to his sister in 1861: "Hammer the Poles until they despair of living [...] I have all the sympathy in the world for their situation, but if we want to exist we have no choice but to wipe them out: wolves are only what God made them, but we shoot them all the same when we can get at them." Later that year, the public Bismarck modified his belligerence and wrote to Prussia's foreign minister: "Every success of the Polish national movement is a defeat for Prussia, we cannot carry on the fight against this element according to the rules of civil justice, but only in accordance with the rules of war."

In Prussia's eastern provinces, the authorities progressively restricted the use of Polish in education and public administration. In 1873, German was made the language of instruction in primary schools in the Province of Posen, initially with exceptions for religious teaching. A Prussian law of 1876 established German as the language of government administration, while ministerial orders in 1887 abolished Polish-language instruction and Polish as a school subject in primary schools in Posen and West Prussia.

In 1885–1886, Prussian authorities expelled more than 30,000 people from the eastern provinces who lacked German citizenship, including Polish migrants and several thousand Jews who held Russian or Austrian citizenship. In 1886, the Prussian Landtag established the Prussian Settlement Commission, initially funded with 100 million marks, to purchase estates in Posen and West Prussia and settle German farmers on the land, with the aim of strengthening German landownership in the region.

Germanisation policies also affected the Danish-speaking population of North Schleswig. Prussian regulations progressively increased the use of German in schools, and a decree issued in December 1888 made German the language of instruction from 1889, with exceptions for religious teaching and some instruction for younger pupils.

In Alsace-Lorraine, linguistic policies were less restrictive, and French remained permitted as a language of instruction in officially French-speaking areas. The authorities nevertheless restricted political ties with France; in 1888, Bismarck introduced passport and visa requirements for foreign visitors entering the territory from France.

=== Socialism ===
Bismarck was concerned by the growing international socialist movement, in particular the Socialist Workers' Party of Germany (SAP), which was renamed the Social Democratic Party of Germany (SPD) in 1890. In 1878, following two failed assassination attempts against Kaiser Wilhelm I, which Bismarck blamed on the SAP without evidence, the Reichstag passed the Anti-Socialist Laws. They banned socialist organisations and meetings, closed newspapers and prohibited the circulation of socialist literature. Altogether some 330 workers' organizations, including many trade unions, were banned during the twelve-year life of the law. The law also allowed authorities to prohibit people considered threats to public order from residing in specified districts. During its twelve years in force, around 1,500 people were sentenced to imprisonment and nearly 900 were ordered to leave particular towns or districts within the empire; some went into exile. The Anti-Socialist Laws did not, however, affect electoral laws or parliamentary immunity. Men who were known to have social democratic backgrounds were still able to run as individuals in elections and legally participate in parliamentary work in the Reichstag and state parliaments.

During the 1880s, Bismarck also tried to win the allegiance of the working classes to the conservative regime by implementing social benefits, such as accident and old-age insurance, labor protections, as well as by pioneering the first universal healthcare reforms which are now grouped under the label "state socialism". Bismarck himself called it that, in addition to referring to them as "practical Christianity":

The whole problem is rooted in the question: does the state have the responsibility to care for its helpless fellow citizens, or does it not? I maintain that it does have this duty, and to be sure, not simply the Christian state, as I once permitted myself to allude to with the words "practical Christianity", but rather every state by its very nature. ... There are objectives that only the state in its totality can fulfil. [...] Among the last mentioned objectives [of the state] belong national defence [and] the general system of transportation. [...] To these belong also the help of persons in distress and the prevention of such justified complaints as in fact provide excellent material for exploitation by the Social Democrats. That is the responsibility of the state from which the state will not be able to withdraw in the long run.

Despite these strategies, Bismarck did not succeed in crushing socialism. Although the Social Democrats' vote share initially declined, it reached 19.7 per cent in the 1890 Reichstag election, the largest share won by any party. The Anti-Socialist Law expired on 30 September 1890.

=== Foreign policies ===
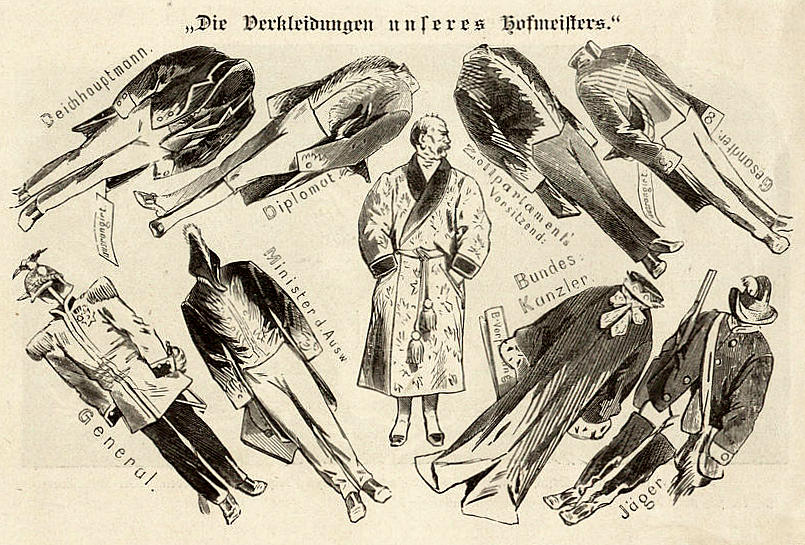
Cartoon from 1867 making fun of Bismarck's different roles, from general to minister of foreign affairs, federal chancellor, hunter, diplomat and president of the parliament of the Zollverein, the Prussian-dominated German customs union

One of the secrets of Bismarck's success was his careful in-depth study of the national interest of all the other states. He thereby avoided the pitfall of misunderstandings that led to conflicts. Even more important he identified opportunities whereby the national interest of another state was congruent to that of Germany, and a deal could be achieved to the benefit of both.

Summarizing Bismarck's mastery of diplomacy, Jonathan Steinberg argues:

In international relations, it meant absolutely no emotional commitment to any of the actors. Diplomacy should, he believed, deal with realities, calculations of probabilities, assessing the inevitable missteps and sudden lurches by the other actors, states, and their statesmen. The chessboard could be overseen and it suited Bismarck's peculiar genius for politics to maintain in his head multiple possible moves by adversaries....He had his goals in mind and achieved them. He was and remained to the end master of the finely tuned game of diplomacy. He enjoyed it. In foreign affairs he never lost his temper, rarely felt ill or sleepless. He could outsmart and outplay the smartest people in other states.

The powerful Imperial German Army was under the control of Bismarck's close ally Field Marshal Helmuth von Moltke the Elder. It was a model of professionalism although it fought no wars. The Imperial German Navy was small under Bismarck.

After fifteen years of warfare in the Crimea, Germany and France, Europe began a period of peace in 1871. With the founding of the German Empire in 1871, Bismarck emerged as a decisive figure in European history from 1871 to 1890. He retained control over Prussia and as well as the foreign and domestic policies of the new German Empire. Bismarck had built his reputation as a war-maker but changed overnight into a peacemaker. In this role, he employed balance of power diplomacy to maintain Germany's position in a Europe which, despite many disputes and war scares, remained at peace. For historian Eric Hobsbawm, it was Bismarck who "remained undisputed world champion at the game of multilateral diplomatic chess for almost twenty years after 1871, [and] devoted himself exclusively, and successfully, to maintaining peace between the powers". Historian Paul Knaplund concludes:

A net result of the strength and military prestige of Germany combined with situations created or manipulated by her chancellor was that in the eighties Bismarck became the umpire in all serious diplomatic disputes, whether they concerned Europe, Africa, or Asia. Questions such as the boundaries of Balkan states, the treatment of Armenians in the Turkish Empire and of Jews in Rumania, the financial affairs of Egypt, Russian expansion in the Middle East, the war between France and China, and the partition of Africa had to be referred to Berlin; Bismarck held the key to all these problems.

Bismarck's main mistake was giving in to the Army and to intense public demand in Germany for the acquisition of the border provinces of Alsace and Lorraine, thereby turning France into a permanent, deeply-committed enemy (see French–German enmity). Theodore Zeldin says, "Revenge and the recovery of Alsace-Lorraine became a principal object of French policy for the next forty years. That Germany was France's enemy became the basic fact of international relations." Bismarck's solution was to make France a pariah nation, encouraging royalty to ridicule its new republican status, and building complex alliances with the other major powers – Austria-Hungary, Russia, and Britain – to keep France isolated diplomatically. A key element was the League of the Three Emperors, in which Bismarck brought together rulers in Berlin, Vienna and St. Petersburg to guarantee each other's security, while blocking out France; it lasted 1881–1887.

==== Early relations with Europe ====
Map of Bismarck's alliances

1 / Dual Alliance (1879); 2 / League of the Three Emperors (1881)	3 / Triple Alliance (1882); 4 / Reinsurance Treaty (1887)

Having unified his nation, Bismarck now devoted himself to preventing war in Europe with his skills in statesmanship. He was forced to contend with French revanchism, the desire to avenge the losses of the Franco-Prussian War. Bismarck, therefore, engaged in a policy of diplomatically isolating France while maintaining cordial relations with other nations in Europe. He had little interest in naval or colonial entanglements and thus avoided discord with Great Britain. Historians emphasise that he wanted no more territorial gains after 1871, and vigorously worked to form cross-linking alliances that prevented any war in Europe from starting. By 1878 both the Liberal and Conservative spokesmen in Britain hailed him as the champion of peace in Europe. A. J. P. Taylor, a leading British diplomatic historian, concludes that, "Bismarck was an honest broker of peace; and his system of alliances compelled every Power, whatever its will, to follow a peaceful course". However, for the British royal family, which enjoyed close familial ties to the Hohenzollerns, the prevailing view of Bismarck was far less positive. Queen Victoria, like her daughter and son-in-law, despised Bismarck. In a letter dated 8 June 1885, she called the German chancellor "overbearing, violent, grasping, and unprincipled," "insolent," and "a terrible man," adding that "all agreed that he was becoming like that first Napoleon."

Well aware that Europe was skeptical of his powerful new Reich, Bismarck turned his attention to preserving the status quo in Europe based on a balance of power that would allow Germany's economy to flourish. Bismarck feared that a hostile combination of Austria-Hungary, France, and Russia would crush Germany. If two of them were allied, then the third would ally with Germany only if Germany conceded excessive demands. The solution was to ally with two of the three. In 1873 he formed the League of the Three Emperors (Dreikaiserbund), an alliance of Wilhelm, Tsar Alexander II of Russia, and Emperor Francis Joseph of Austria-Hungary. Together they would control Eastern Europe, making sure that restive ethnic groups such as the Poles were kept under control. The Balkans posed a more serious issue, and Bismarck's solution was to give Austria-Hungary predominance in the western areas, and Russia in the eastern areas. This system collapsed in 1887.

In 1872, a protracted quarrel began to fester between Bismarck and Count Harry von Arnim, the imperial ambassador to France. Arnim saw himself as a rival and competitor for the chancellorship, but the rivalry escalated out of hand, and Arnim took sensitive records from embassy files in Paris to back up his case. He was formally accused of misappropriating official documents, indicted, tried and convicted, finally fleeing into exile where he died. No one again openly challenged Bismarck in foreign policy matters until his resignation.

==== France ====
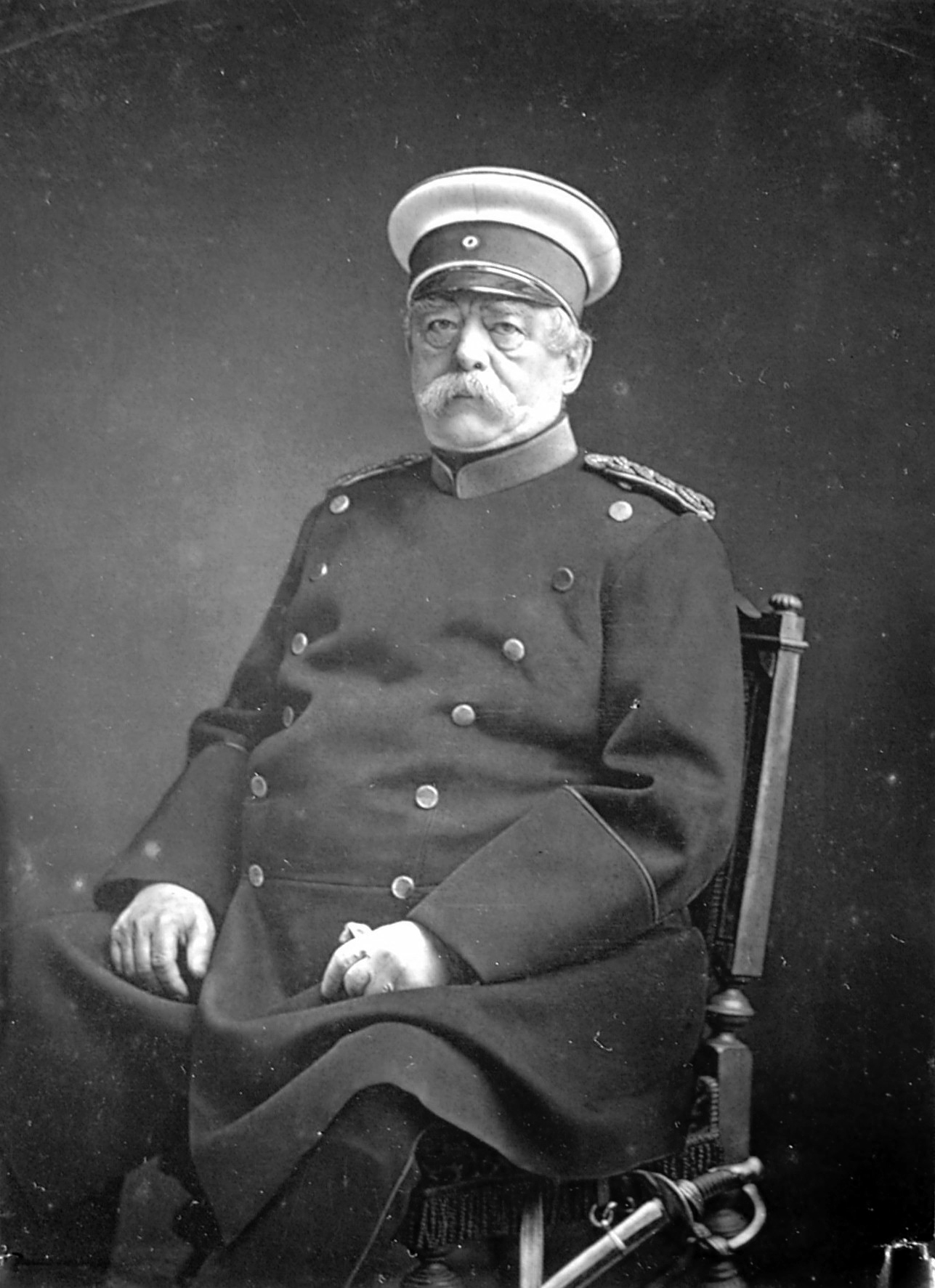
Bismarck c. 1875

France was Bismarck's main problem. Peaceful relations with France became impossible after 1871 when Germany annexed all of the province of Alsace and much of Lorraine. Public opinion demanded it to humiliate France, and the Army wanted its more defensible frontiers. Bismarck reluctantly gave in, the French would never forget or forgive, he calculated, so might as well take the provinces. (That was a mistaken assumption—after about five years the French did calm down and considered it a minor issue.) Germany's foreign policy fell into a trap with no exit. "In retrospect it is easy to see that the annexation of Alsace-Lorraine was a tragic mistake." Once the annexation took place the only policy that made sense was trying to isolate France, so it had no strong allies. However, France complicated Berlin's plans when it became friends with Russia. In 1905 a German plan for an alliance with Russia fell through because Russia was too close to France.

Between 1873 and 1877, Germany repeatedly manipulated the internal affairs of France's neighbours to hurt France. Bismarck put heavy pressure on Belgium, Spain, and Italy hoping to obtain the election of liberal, anticlerical governments. His plan was to promote republicanism in France by isolating the clerical-monarchist regime of President Patrice de MacMahon. He hoped that surrounding France with liberal states would help the French republicans defeat MacMahon and his reactionary supporters.

The bullying, however, almost got out of hand in mid-1875, when an editorial entitled "Krieg-in-Sicht" ("War in Sight") was published in a Berlin newspaper close to the government, the Post. The editorial indicated that highly influential Germans were alarmed by France's rapid recovery from defeat in 1875 and its announcement of an increase in the size of its army, as well as talks of launching a preventive war against France. Bismarck denied knowing about the article ahead of time, but he certainly knew about the talk of preventive war. The editorial produced a war scare, with Britain and Russia warning that they would not tolerate a preventive war against France. Bismarck had no desire for war either, and the crisis soon blew over. It was a rare instance where Bismarck was outmanoeuvred and embarrassed by his opponents, but from that, he learned an important lesson. It forced him to take into account the fear and alarm that his bullying and Germany's fast-growing power were causing among its neighbours and reinforced his determination that Germany should work in a proactive fashion to preserve the peace in Europe, rather than passively let events take their own course and reacting to them.

==== Italy ====
Bismarck maintained good relations with Italy, although he had a personal dislike for Italians and their country. He can be seen as a marginal contributor to Italian unification. Politics surrounding the 1866 Austro-Prussian War allowed Italy to annex Venetia, which had been a kronland ("crown land") of the Austrian Empire since the 1815 Congress of Vienna. In addition, French mobilisation for the Franco-Prussian War of 1870–1871 made it necessary for Napoleon III to withdraw his troops from Rome and the Papal States. Without these two events, Italian unification would have been a more prolonged process.

==== Russia ====
After Russia's victory over the Ottoman Empire in the Russo-Turkish War of 1877–1878, Bismarck helped negotiate a settlement at the Congress of Berlin. The Treaty of Berlin revised the earlier Treaty of San Stefano, reducing the size and sovereignty of the new Principality of Bulgaria (a pro-Russian state at that time). Bismarck and other European leaders opposed the growth of Russian influence and tried to protect the integrity of the Ottoman Empire (see Eastern Question). As a result, Russo-German relations further deteriorated, with the Russian Foreign Minister Gorchakov denouncing Bismarck for compromising his nation's victory. The relationship was additionally strained due to Germany's protectionist trade policies. Some in the German military clamoured for a preemptive war with Russia; Bismarck refused, stating: "Preemptive war is like committing suicide for fear of death."

Bismarck realised that both Russia and Britain considered control of central Asia a high priority, dubbed the "Great Game". Germany had no direct stakes, however, its dominance of Europe was enhanced when Russian troops were based as far away from Germany as possible. Over two decades, 1871–1890, he manoeuvred to help the British, hoping to force the Russians to commit more soldiers to Asia.

==== Triple Alliance ====
The League of the Three Emperors having fallen apart, Bismarck negotiated the Dual Alliance with Austria-Hungary, in which each guaranteed the other against Russian attack. He also negotiated the Triple Alliance in 1882 with Austria-Hungary and Italy, and Italy and Austria-Hungary soon reached the "Mediterranean Agreement" with Britain. Attempts to reconcile Germany and Russia did not have a lasting effect: the Three Emperors' League was re-established in 1881 but quickly fell apart, ending Russian-Austrian-Prussian solidarity, which had existed in various forms since 1813. Bismarck therefore negotiated the secret Reinsurance Treaty of 1887 with Russia, in order to prevent the Franco-Russian encirclement of Germany. Both powers promised to remain neutral towards one another unless Russia attacked Austria-Hungary. However, after Bismarck's departure from office in 1890, the treaty was not renewed, thus creating a critical problem for Germany in the event of a war.

==== Colonies and imperialism ====
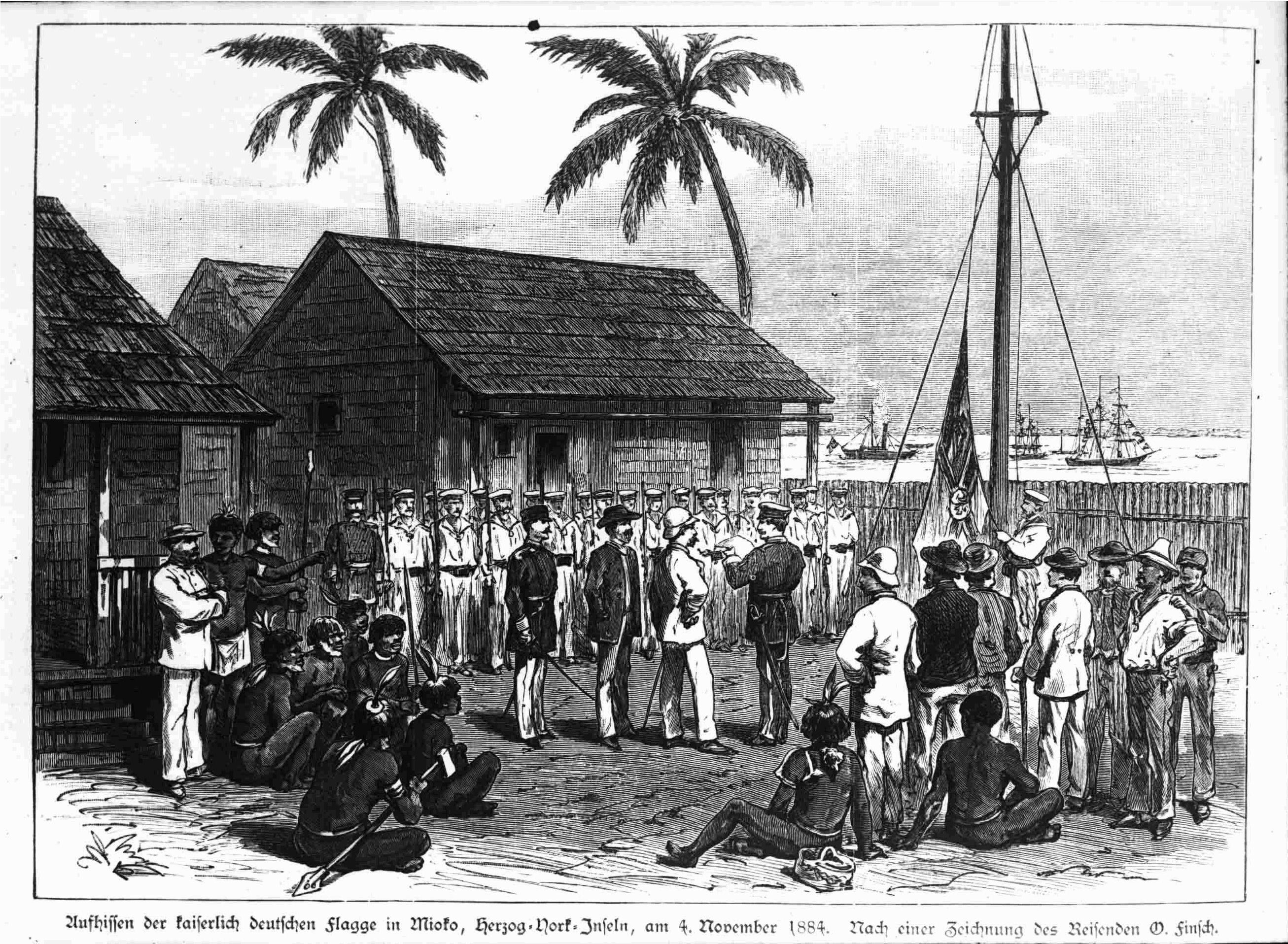
Hoisting the German flag at Mioko, German New Guinea in 1884

Bismarck had opposed colonial acquisitions, arguing that the burden of obtaining, maintaining, and defending such possessions would outweigh any potential benefit, frequently stating that he was "no man for colonies". He felt that colonies did not pay for themselves, that the German formal bureaucratic system would not work well in the easy-going tropics, and that the diplomatic disputes colonies brought would distract Germany from its central interest, Europe itself. As for French designs on Morocco, Chlodwig, Prince of Hohenlohe-Schillingsfürst wrote in his memoirs that Bismarck had told him that Germany "could only be pleased if France took possession of the country" since "she would then be very occupied" and distracted from the loss of Alsace-Lorraine. However, in 1883–1884 he suddenly reversed himself and overnight built a colonial empire in Africa and the South Pacific. The Berlin Conference of 1884–1885 organised by Bismarck can be seen as the formalisation of the Scramble for Africa.

Historians have debated the exact motive behind Bismarck's sudden and short-lived move. He was aware that public opinion had started to demand colonies for reasons of German prestige. He also wanted to undercut the anti-colonial liberals who were sponsored by the Crown Prince, who—given Wilhelm I's old age—might soon become emperor and remove Bismarck. Bismarck was influenced by Hamburg merchants and traders, his neighbours at Friedrichsruh. The establishment of the German colonial empire proceeded smoothly, starting with German New Guinea in 1884.

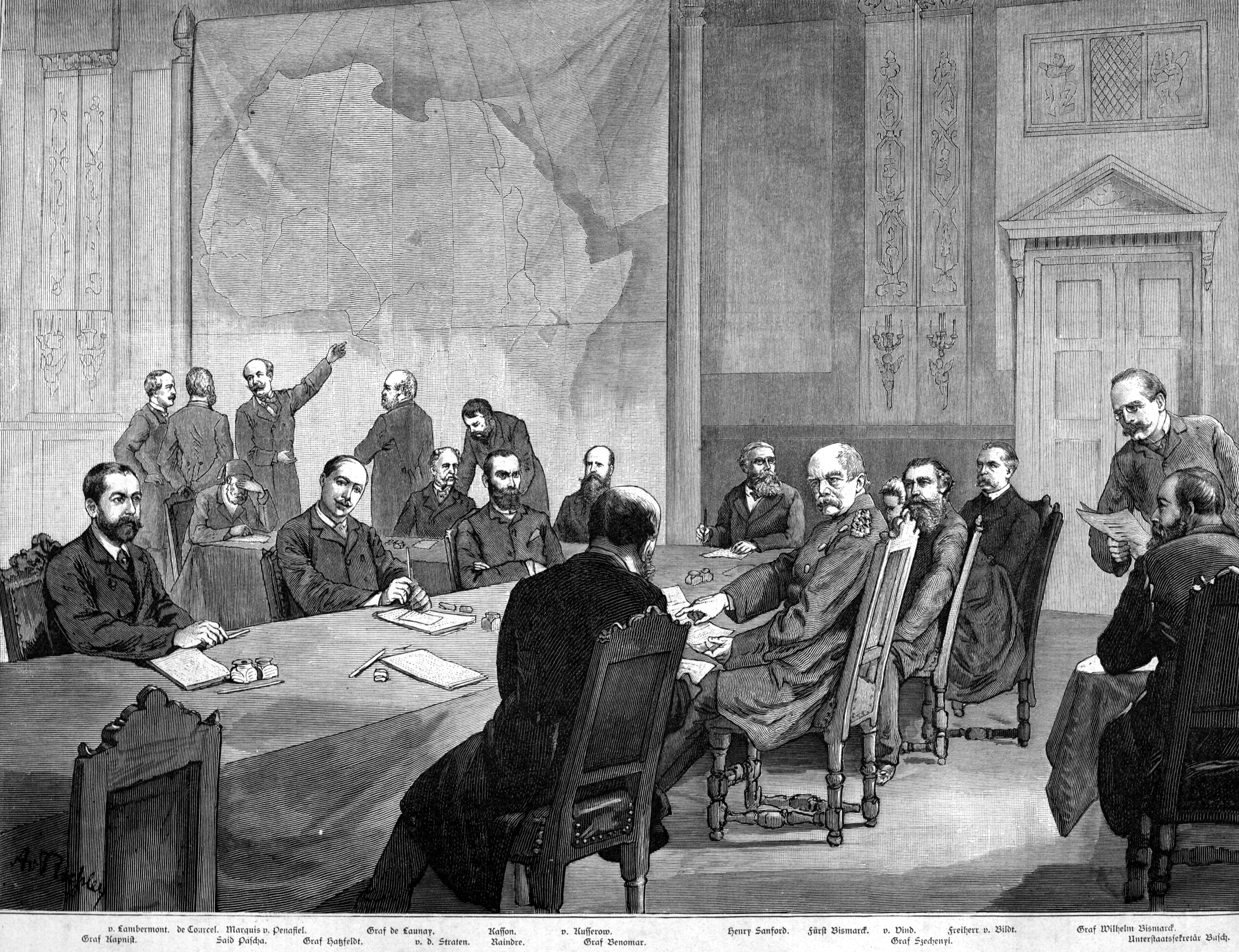
European officials staking claims to Africa in the Conference of Berlin in 1884

Other European nations, led by Britain and France, were acquiring colonies in a rapid fashion (see New Imperialism). Bismarck therefore made the decision to join the Scramble for Africa. Germany's new colonies included Togoland (now Togo and part of Ghana), German Kamerun (now Cameroon and part of Nigeria), German East Africa (now Rwanda, Burundi, and the mainland part of Tanzania), and German South-West Africa (now Namibia). The Berlin Conference (1884–1885) established regulations for the acquisition of African colonies; in particular, it protected free trade in certain parts of the Congo Basin. Germany also acquired colonies in the Pacific, such as German New Guinea.

Hans-Ulrich Wehler argues that his imperialistic policies were based on internal political and economic forces; they were not his response to external pressure. At first he promoted liberal goals of free trade commercial expansionism in order to maintain economic growth and social stability, as well as preserve the social and political power structure. However, he changed, broke with the liberals, and adopted tariffs to win Catholic support and shore up his political base. Germany's imperialism in the 1880s derived less from strength and instead represented Bismarck's solution to unstable industrialization. Protectionism made for unity at a time when class conflict was rising. Wehler says the chancellor's ultimate goal was to strengthen traditional social and power structures and avoid a major war.

==== Avoiding war ====
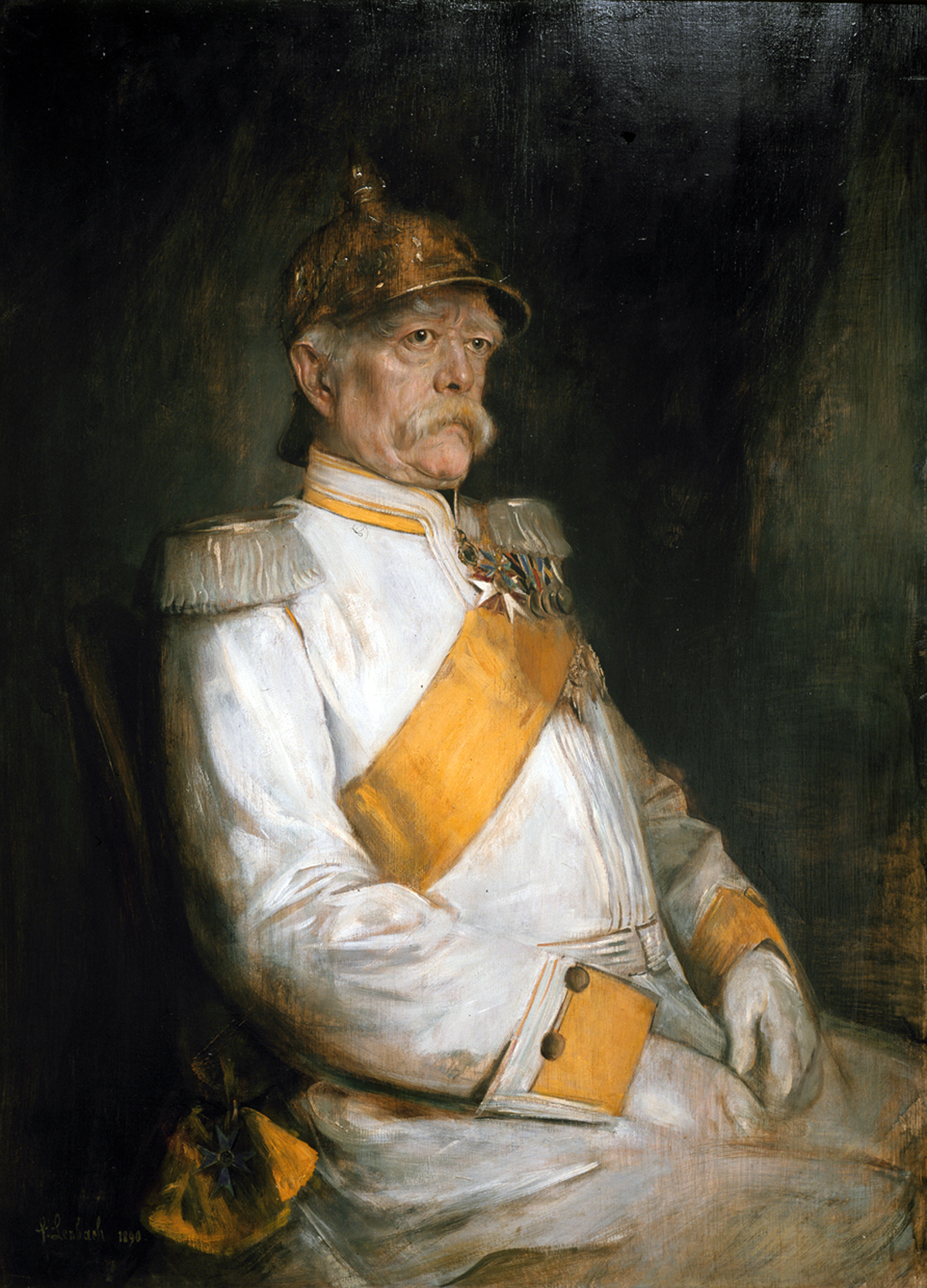
Franz von Lenbach's portrait of Bismarck in his 75th year. He is in the uniform of the Cuirassier Regiment No. 7 (Magdeburg).

In February 1888, during a Bulgarian crisis, Bismarck addressed the Reichstag on the dangers of a European war:

He warned of the imminent possibility that Germany will have to fight on two fronts; he spoke of the desire for peace; then he set forth the Balkan case for war and demonstrated its futility: "Bulgaria, that little country between the Danube and the Balkans, is far from being an object of adequate importance... for which to plunge Europe from Moscow to the Pyrenees, and from the North Sea to Palermo, into a war whose issue no man can foresee. At the end of the conflict we should scarcely know why we had fought."

Bismarck also repeated his emphatic warning against any German military involvement in Balkan disputes. Bismarck had first made this famous comment to the Reichstag in December 1876, when the Balkan revolts against the Ottoman Empire threatened to extend to a war between Austria-Hungary and Russia:

Only a year later [1876], he is faced by the alternative of espousing the cause of Russia or that of Austria-Hungary. Immediately after the last crisis, in the summer of 1875, the mutual jealousies between Russia and Austria-Hungary had been rendered acute by the fresh risings in the Balkans against the Turks. Now the issues hung upon Bismarck's decision. Immediately after the peace, he had tried to paralyse the Balkan rivals by the formation of the Three Emperors' League. "I have no thought of intervening," he said privately. "That might precipitate a European war.... If I were to espouse the cause of one of the parties, France would promptly strike a blow on the other side.... I am holding two powerful heraldic beasts by their collars, and am keeping them apart for two reasons: first of all, lest they should tear one another to pieces; and secondly, lest they should come to an understanding at our expense." In the Reichstag, he popularises the same idea in the words: "I am opposed to the notion of any sort of active participation of Germany in these matters, so long as I can see no reason to suppose that German interests are involved, no interests on behalf of which it is worth our risking—excuse my plain speaking—the healthy bones of one of our Pomeranian musketeers."

A leading diplomatic historian of the era, William L. Langer sums up Bismarck's two decades as Chancellor:

Whatever else may be said of the intricate alliance system evolved by the German Chancellor, it must be admitted that it worked and that it tided Europe over a period of several critical years without a rupture.... there was, as Bismarck himself said, a premium upon the maintenance of peace.

Langer concludes:

His had been a great career, beginning with three wars in eight years and ending with a period of 20 years during which he worked for the peace of Europe, despite countless opportunities to embark on further enterprises with more than even chance of success.... No other statesman of his standing had ever before shown the same great moderation and sound political sense of the possible and desirable.... Bismarck at least deserves full credit for having steered European politics through this dangerous transitional period without serious conflict between the great powers."

=== Social legislation ===
Bismarck's social legislation was a reaction to the social question triggered by industrialisation.

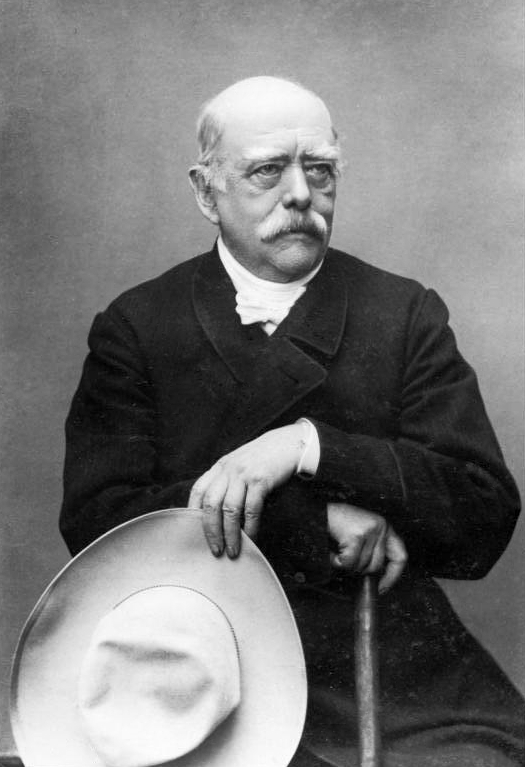
Photo of Chancellor Bismarck in the 1880s

==== Early legislation ====
In domestic policy, Bismarck pursued a conservative state-building strategy designed to make ordinary Germans—not just his own Junker elite—more loyal to the throne and empire, implementing the modern welfare state in Germany in the 1880s. According to Kees van Kersbergen and Barbara Vis, his strategy was:

granting social rights to enhance the integration of a hierarchical society, to forge a bond between workers and the state so as to strengthen the latter, to maintain traditional relations of authority between social and status groups, and to provide a countervailing power against the modernist forces of liberalism and socialism.

Bismarck worked closely with large industries and aimed to stimulate German economic growth by giving workers greater security. A secondary concern was trumping the Social Democrats, who had no welfare proposals of their own and opposed Bismarck's. Bismarck especially listened to Hermann Wagener and Theodor Lohmann, advisers who persuaded him to give workers a corporate status in the legal and political structures of the new German state. In March 1884, Bismarck declared:

The real grievance of the worker is the insecurity of his existence; he is not sure that he will always have work, he is not sure that he will always be healthy, and he foresees that he will one day be old and unfit to work. If he falls into poverty, even if only through a prolonged illness, he is then completely helpless, left to his own devices, and society does not currently recognise any real obligation towards him beyond the usual help for the poor, even if he has been working all the time ever so faithfully and diligently. The usual help for the poor, however, leaves a lot to be desired, especially in large cities, where it is very much worse than in the country.

As noted by one observer, Bismarck argued that the state should not only provide employment for those able to do so, but that provisions should be made for workers in cases of old age and sickness:

"Give the working-man the right to work as long as he is healthy," he said on May 9th; "assure him care when he is sick; assure him maintenance when he is old. If you do that, and do not fear the sacrifice, or cry out at State Socialism directly the words 'provision for old age' are uttered, — if the State will show a little more Christian solicitude for the working-man, then I believe that the gentlemen of the Wyden (Social-Democratic) programme will sound their bird-call in vain, and that the thronging to them will cease as soon as working-men see that the Government and legislative bodies are earnestly concerned for their welfare."

Bismarck's idea was to implement welfare programs that were acceptable to conservatives without any socialistic aspects. He was dubious about laws protecting workers at the workplace, such as safe working conditions, limitation of work hours, and the regulation of women's and child labour. He believed that such regulation would force workers and employers to reduce work and production and thus harm the economy. Bismarck opened debate on the subject in November 1881 in the Imperial Message to the Reichstag, using the term practical Christianity to describe his program. Bismarck's program centred squarely on insurance programs designed to increase productivity and focus the political attention of German workers on supporting the Junkers' government. The program included sickness insurance, accident insurance, disability insurance, and a retirement pension, none of which were then in existence to any great degree.

Based on Bismarck's message, the Reichstag filed three bills to deal with the concepts of accident and sickness insurance. The subjects of retirement pensions and disability insurance were placed on the back burner for the time being. The social legislation implemented by Bismarck in the 1880s played a key role in the sharp, rapid decline of German emigration to America. Young men considering emigration looked at not only the gap between higher hourly "direct wages" in the United States and Germany but also the differential in "indirect wages", social benefits, which favoured staying in Germany. The young men went to German industrial cities so that Bismarck's insurance system partly offset low wage rates in Germany and further reduced the emigration rate.

==== Sickness Insurance Law of 1883 ====
The first successful bill, passed in 1883, was the Sickness Insurance Bill. Bismarck considered the program, established to provide sickness insurance for German industrial laborers, the least important and the least politically troublesome. The health service was established on a local basis, with the cost divided between employers and the employed. The employers contributed one-third, and the workers contributed two-thirds. The minimum payments for medical treatment and sick pay for up to 13 weeks were legally fixed. The individual local health bureaus were administered by a committee elected by the members of each bureau, and this move had the unintended effect of establishing a majority representation for the workers on account of their large financial contributions. This worked to the advantage of the Social Democrats who, through heavy worker membership, achieved their first small foothold in public administration.

According to a 2019 study, the health insurance legislation caused a substantial reduction in mortality.

==== Accident Insurance Law of 1884 ====
Bismarck's government had to submit three draft bills before it could get one passed by the Reichstag in 1884. Bismarck had originally proposed that the federal government pay a portion of the accident insurance contribution. Bismarck wanted to demonstrate the willingness of the German government to reduce the hardship experienced by the German workers so as to wean them away from supporting the various left-wing parties, most importantly the Social Democrats. The National Liberals took this program to be an expression of State Socialism, against which they were dead set. The Centre Party was afraid of the expansion of federal power at the expense of states' rights.

As a result, the only way the program could be passed at all was for the entire expense to be underwritten by the employers. To facilitate this, Bismarck arranged for the administration of this program to be placed in the hands of Der Arbeitgeberverband in den beruflichen Korporationen (the Organisation of Employers in Occupational Corporations). This organisation established central and bureaucratic insurance offices on the federal, and in some cases, the state level to actually administer the program whose benefits kicked in to replace the sickness insurance program as of the 14th week. It paid for medical treatment and a pension of up to two-thirds of earned wages if the worker were fully disabled.

In 1885, the coverage of the program was extended to various state-owned enterprises with a particularly serious risk of accidents for workers, and to agricultural workers in 1886.

==== Health and safety regulations ====
In 1884, the Federal Council issued safety regulations for match factories, followed by regulations for lead paint and lead sugar factories in 1886 and for cigar factories in 1888.

==== Old Age and Disability Insurance Law of 1889 ====
The old age pension program, insurance equally financed by employers and workers, was designed to provide a pension annuity for workers who reached the age of 70. Unlike the accident and sickness insurance programs, this program covered all categories of workers (industrial, agrarian, artisans and servants) from the start. Also, unlike the other two programs, the principle that the national government should contribute a portion of the underwriting cost, with the other two portions prorated accordingly, was accepted without question. The disability insurance program was intended to be used by those permanently disabled. This time, the state or province supervised the programs directly.

== Downfall ==
=== Final years and forced resignation ===
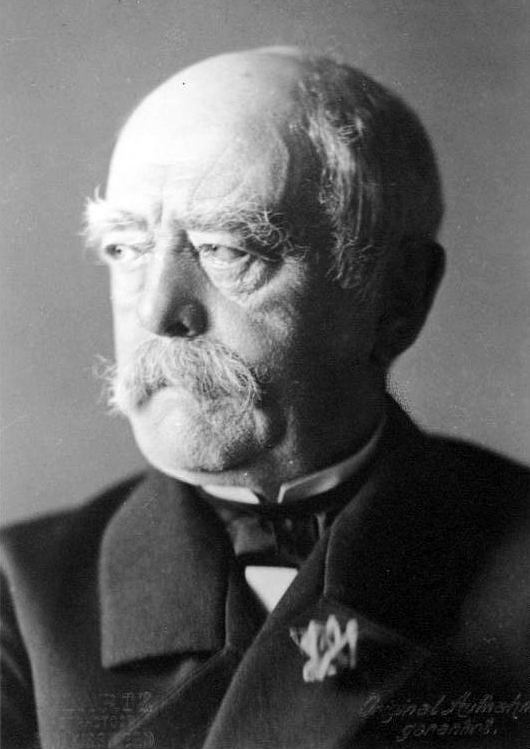
Bismarck in 1890

In 1888, Kaiser Wilhelm I died. He left the throne to his son, Frederick III. The new monarch was already suffering from cancer of the larynx and died after reigning for only 99 days. He was succeeded by his son, Wilhelm II, who opposed Bismarck's careful foreign policy, preferring vigorous and rapid expansion to enlarge Germany's "place in the sun".

Bismarck was sixteen years older than Frederick; before the latter became terminally ill, Bismarck did not expect he would live to see Wilhelm ascend to the throne and thus had no strategy to deal with him. Conflicts between Wilhelm and his chancellor soon poisoned their relationship. Their final split occurred after Bismarck tried to strengthen the Anti-Socialist Laws and make them permanent. The Kartell majority in the Reichstag, including the Conservative Party and the National Liberal Party, was willing to make most of the law permanent. However, it was split about the section that gave the police the power to expel socialist agitators from their homes if convicted under the laws. The National Liberals refused to make it permanent, while the Conservatives supported only the entirety of the bill, threatening to and eventually voting against the entire bill in session because Bismarck would not agree to modifying it.

As the debate continued, Wilhelm became increasingly interested in social problems, especially the treatment of mine workers during their strike in 1889. Keeping with his active policy in government, he routinely interrupted Bismarck in Council to make clear his social views. Bismarck sharply disagreed with Wilhelm's policies and worked to circumvent them. Even though Wilhelm supported the altered anti-socialist bill, Bismarck pushed for his support to veto the bill in its entirety. When his arguments could not convince Wilhelm, Bismarck became excited and agitated until uncharacteristically blurting out his motive to see the bill fail: to have the socialists agitate until a violent clash occurred that could be used as a pretext to crush them. Wilhelm countered that he was not willing to open his reign with a bloody campaign against his own subjects. The next day, after realising his blunder, Bismarck attempted to reach a compromise with Wilhelm by agreeing to his social policy towards industrial workers and even suggested a European council to discuss working conditions, presided over by the Emperor.

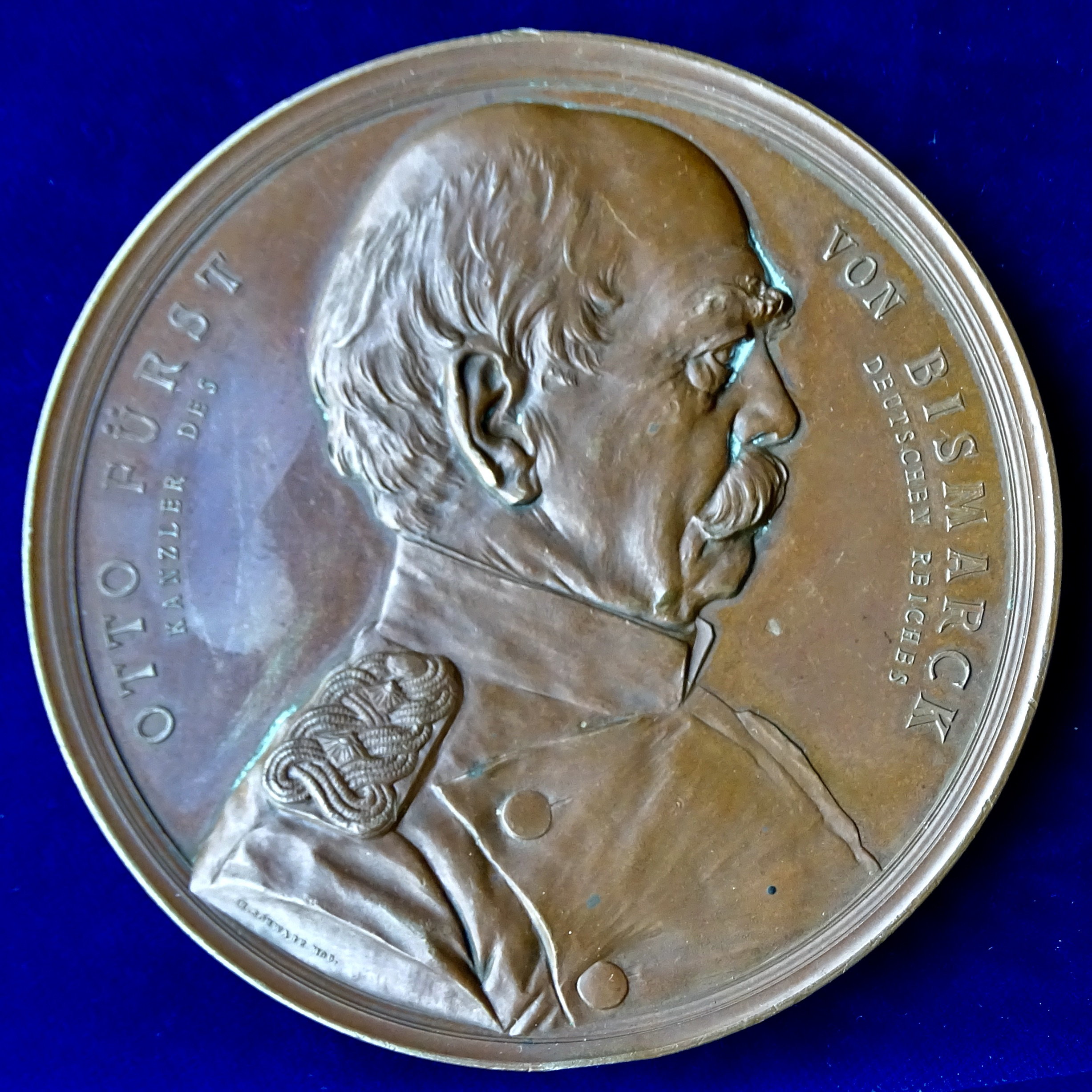
1890 Bismarck in his last year as Chancellor, Medal by H. Schwabe, obverse

Still, a turn of events eventually led to his breaking up with Wilhelm. Bismarck, feeling pressured and unappreciated by the emperor and undermined by ambitious advisers, refused to sign a proclamation regarding the protection of workers along with Wilhelm, as was required by the German constitution. His refusal to sign was apparently to protest Wilhelm's ever-increasing interference with Bismarck's previously unquestioned authority. Bismarck also worked behind the scenes to break the Continental labour council on which Wilhelm had set his heart.

The final break came as Bismarck searched for a new parliamentary majority, as his Kartell was voted from power as a consequence of the anti-socialist bill fiasco. The remaining forces in the Reichstag were the Catholic Centre Party and the Conservative Party. Bismarck wished to form a new bloc with the Centre Party and invited Ludwig Windthorst, the parliamentary leader, to discuss an alliance. That would be Bismarck's last political maneuver. Upon hearing about Windthorst's visit, Wilhelm was furious.

In a parliamentary state, the head of government depends on the confidence of the parliamentary majority and has the right to form coalitions to ensure their policies have majority support. However, in Germany, the Chancellor depended on the confidence of the emperor alone, and Wilhelm believed that the emperor had the right to be informed before his minister's meeting. After a heated argument in Bismarck's office, Wilhelm—to whom Bismarck had shown a letter from Tsar Alexander III describing Wilhelm as a "badly brought-up boy"—stormed out, after first ordering the rescinding of the Cabinet Order enacted in 1851 by Frederick William IV of Prussia, which had forbidden Prussian Cabinet Ministers from reporting directly to the King of Prussia and required them instead to report via the Prussian Prime Minister. Bismarck, forced for the first time into a situation that he could not use to his advantage, wrote a blistering letter of resignation, decrying Wilhelm's interference in foreign and domestic policy. The letter, however, was published only after Bismarck's death.

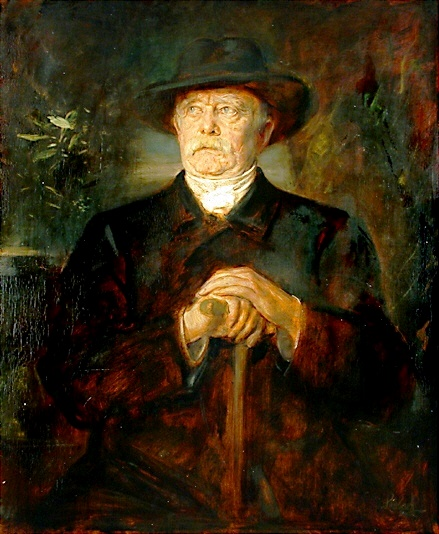
Lenbach painting of Bismarck in retirement (1895)

Bismarck resigned at Wilhelm II's insistence on 18 March 1890, at the age of 75. He was succeeded as Imperial Chancellor and Minister President of Prussia by Leo von Caprivi. After his dismissal he was promoted to the rank of "Colonel-General with the Dignity of Field Marshal", so-called because the German Army did not appoint full Field Marshals in peacetime. He was also given a new title, Duke of Lauenburg, which he joked would be useful when travelling incognito. He was soon elected to the Reichstag as a National Liberal in Bennigsen's old and supposedly safe Hamburg seat, but he was so humiliated by being taken to a second ballot by a Social Democrat opponent that he never actually took up his seat. Bismarck entered into resentful retirement, lived in Friedrichsruh near Hamburg and sometimes on his estates at Varzin, and waited in vain to be called upon for advice and counsel. After his wife's death on 27 November 1894, his health worsened and one year later he finally became a full-time wheelchair user.

=== Death ===
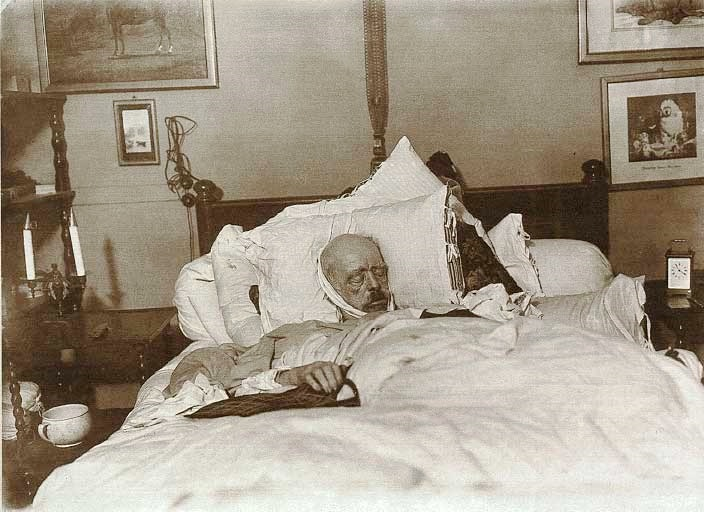
Bismarck on his deathbed, 30 July 1898

Bismarck spent his final years composing his memoirs (Gedanken und Erinnerungen, or Thoughts and Memories), a work lauded by historians. In the memoirs, Bismarck continued his feud with Wilhelm II by attacking him, by increasing the drama around every event and by often presenting himself in a favourable light. He also published the text of the Reinsurance Treaty with Russia, a major breach of national security, for which an individual of lesser status would have been heavily prosecuted.

Bismarck's health began to fail in 1896. He was diagnosed with gangrene in his foot, but refused to accept treatment for it; as a result, he had difficulty walking and often used a wheelchair. By July 1898, he was a full-time wheelchair user, had trouble breathing, and was almost constantly feverish and in pain. His health rallied momentarily on the 28th, but then sharply deteriorated over the next two days. He died just after midnight on 30 July 1898, at the age of 83 in Friedrichsruh, where he is entombed in the Bismarck Mausoleum. He was succeeded as Prince Bismarck by his eldest son, Herbert. Bismarck managed a posthumous snub of Wilhelm II by having his own sarcophagus inscribed with the words, "A loyal German servant of Emperor Wilhelm I".

== Family ==
He married Johanna von Puttkamer in 1847. They had three children: Marie (b. 1848), Herbert (b. 1849) and Wilhelm (b. 1852).

== Legacy and memory ==
=== Reputation ===
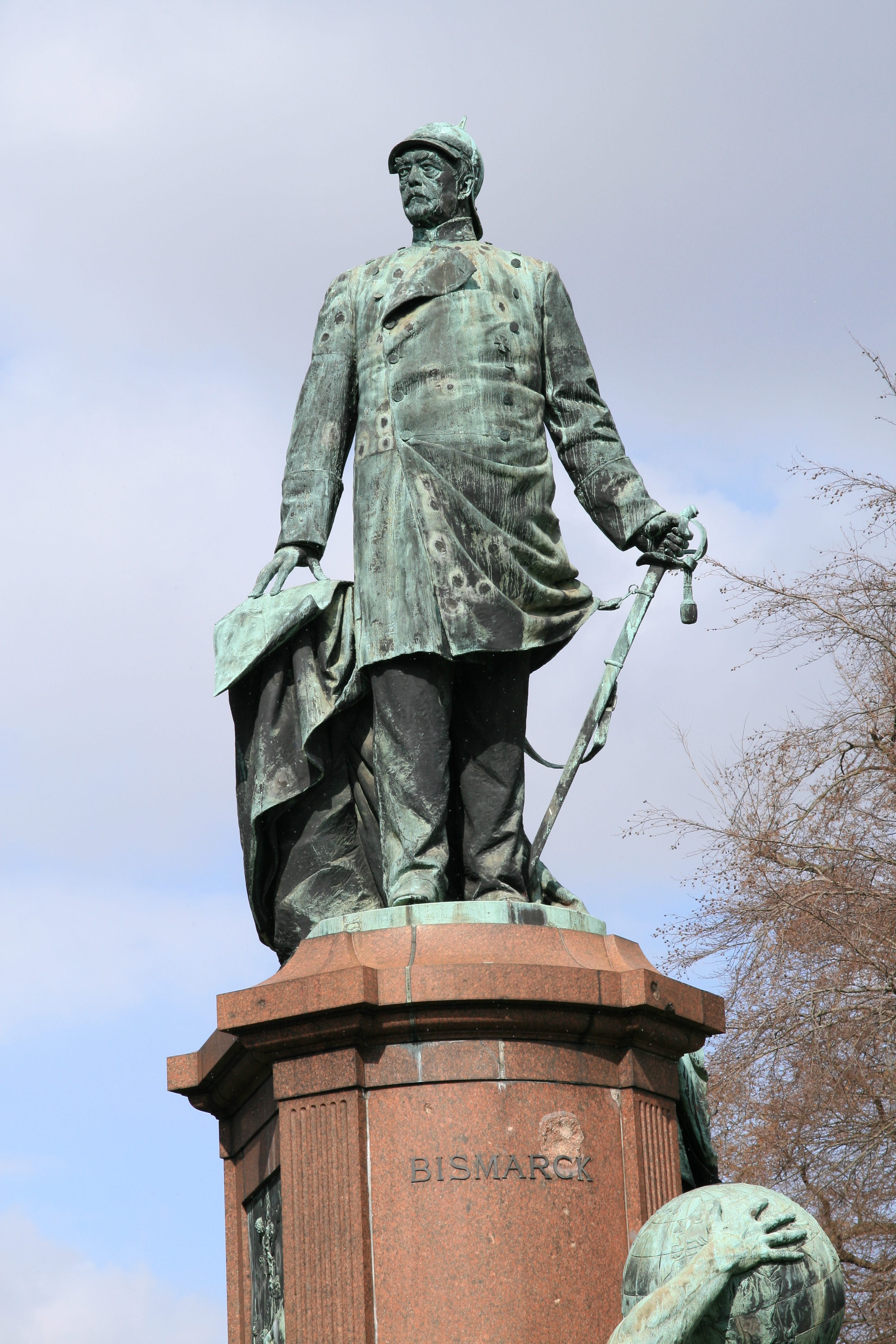
Bismarck Memorial in Berlin

Historians have reached a broad consensus on the content, function, and importance of the image of Bismarck within Germany's political culture over the past 125 years. According to Steinberg, his achievements in 1862–1871 were "the greatest diplomatic and political achievement by any leader in the last two centuries". Bismarck's most important legacy is the unification of Germany. Germany had existed as a collection of hundreds of separate principalities and Free Cities since the formation of the Holy Roman Empire. Over the centuries various rulers had tried to unify the German states without success until Bismarck. Largely as a result of Bismarck's efforts, the various German kingdoms were united into a single country.

Following unification, Germany became one of the most powerful nations in Europe. Bismarck's astute, cautious, and pragmatic foreign policies allowed Germany to peacefully retain the powerful position into which he had brought it, while maintaining amiable diplomacy with almost all European nations. France was the main exception because of the Franco–Prussian War and Bismarck's harsh subsequent policies; France became one of Germany's most bitter enemies in Europe. Austria, too, was weakened by the creation of a German Empire, though to a much lesser extent than France. Bismarck believed that as long as Britain, Russia, and Italy were assured of the peaceful nature of the German Empire, French belligerency could be contained. His diplomatic feats were undone, however, by Kaiser Wilhelm II, whose policies unified other European powers against Germany in time for World War I.

Historians stress that Bismarck's peace-oriented, "saturated continental diplomacy" was increasingly unpopular because it consciously reined in any expansionist drives. The German public turned to an expansionist stance instead. In dramatic contrast to Bismarck's approach stands the ambition of Wilhelm II's Weltpolitik to secure the Reich's future through expansion, leading to World War I. Likewise, Bismarck's policy to deny the military a dominant voice in foreign political decision-making was overturned by 1914 as Germany was increasingly under military control. During the war, the Oberste Heeresleitung established a virtual military dictatorship, largely ignoring the chancellor, emperor, and Reichstag.

Bismarck was a conservative or "white revolutionary". He taught conservatives to be nationalists and supporters of welfare programs, thereby enlarging their base of support and weakening the socialist movement. After working closely with liberals and fighting the Catholics, he switched and added the conservative Catholics to his base while opposing the liberals. However, Henry Kissinger notes the dangers of this legacy for Germany in the 20th century. He so thoroughly undermined liberalism that Weimar Germany never could make liberalism succeed: "Nationalism unleavened by liberalism turned chauvinistic, and liberalism without responsibility grew sterile."

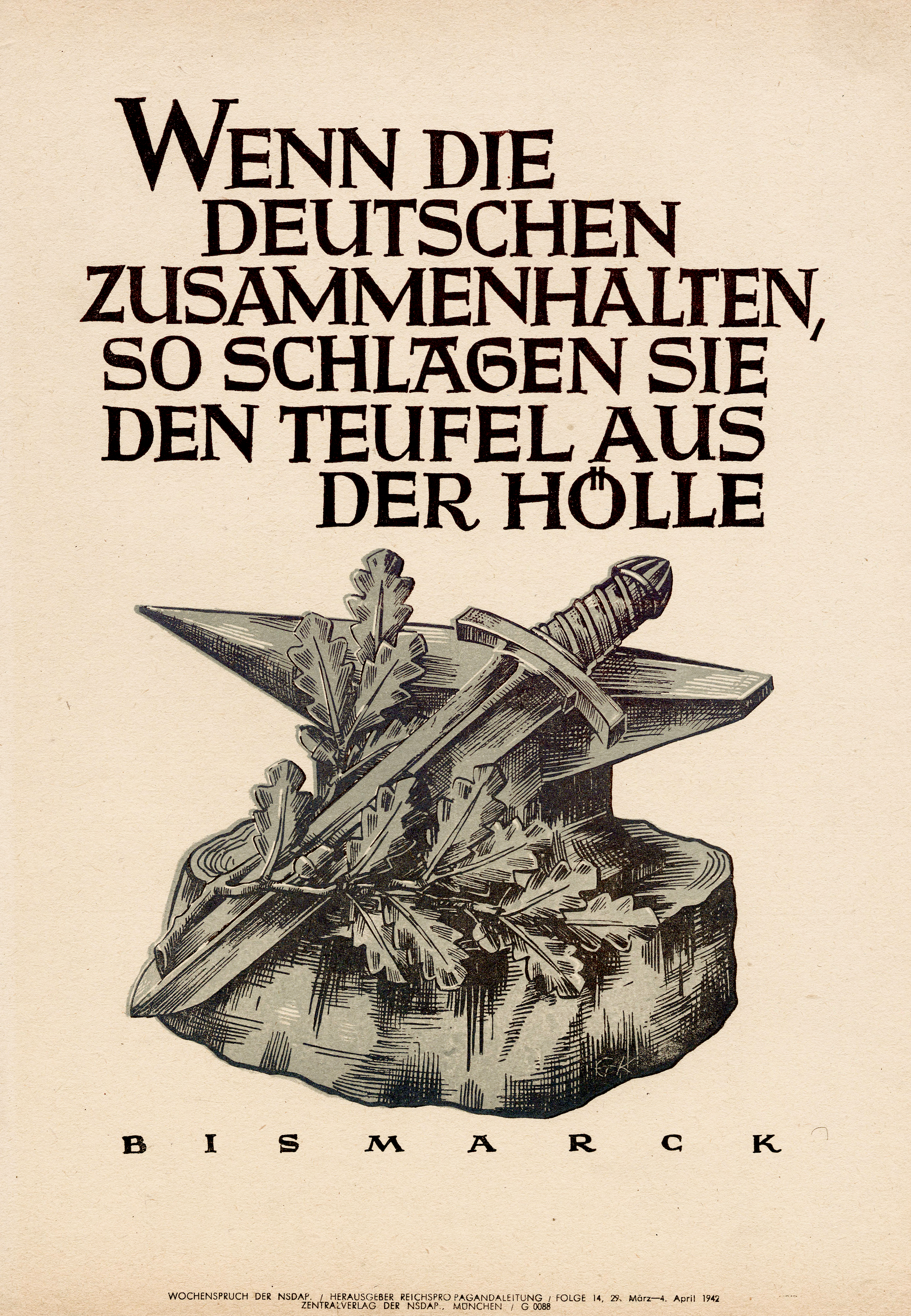
Bismarck's punchy sayings were borrowed by his successors, including the Nazis. This 1942 Nazi propaganda poster quotes Bismarck: "If the Germans stick together, they will beat the devil out of hell."

According to historian Norman Rich:

Nevertheless, the success of Bismarck's diplomacy–and I think it was on the whole successful–did not depend on any system but on his qualities as a diplomat. Of these, the most important was not his genius but his attention to ...the fundamentals of diplomacy: a dispassionate evaluation of national interests; care to avoid challenging the national interests of other great powers; and an awareness of the quality of national power and its limitations. It was the neglect of these fundamentals which, more than anything else, brought disaster to his successors.

In a 1916 speech, former American president Theodore Roosevelt paid tribute to the social and economic advances attained in Germany as a result of Bismarck's policies:

He deliberately undertook to better the conditions of industrial and social life, not by adding to the cost of production, but by eliminating waste and introducing scientific—that is, rational, skilful and efficient—principles into the work of production and of distribution. It was one prime object of his policy to see that business was successful, and businessmen of leadership rewarded: for otherwise the community would either stagnate or go backward, and nobody would get any reward at all. But it was also with him a prime objective to secure for the wageworkers their legitimate shares of the benefits, not only in wages, but in standard of living and in such ways as sickness insurance, old age pensions and the like. Germany is infinitely ahead of us in all of these matters. Germany gives better care, at less cost, to the workingman, in health and in sickness, by her system of organization under government direction, and of organization by perfected private cooperation, than we do by our unregulated individualism.

Bismarck's psychology and personal traits have not been so favourably received by scholars. The historian Jonathan Steinberg portrays a demonic genius who was deeply vengeful, even toward his closest friends and family members:

[Bismarck's friend, German diplomat Kurd von Schlözer] began to see Bismarck as a kind of malign genius who, behind the various postures, concealed an ice-cold contempt for his fellow human beings and a methodical determination to control and ruin them. His easy chat combined blunt truths, partial revelations, and outright deceptions. His extraordinary double ability to see how groups would react and the willingness to use violence to make them obey, the capacity to read group behaviour and the force to make them move to his will, gave him the chance to exercise what [Steinberg has] called his "sovereign self".

Evans says he was "intimidating and unscrupulous, playing to others' frailties, not their strengths". British historians, including Steinberg, Evans, Taylor, and Palmer, see Bismarck as an ambivalent figure, undoubtedly a man of great skill but who left no lasting system in place to guide successors less skilled than himself. Being a committed monarchist himself, Bismarck allowed no effective constitutional check on the power of the Emperor, thus placing a time bomb in the foundation of the Germany that he created. Jonathan Steinberg, in his 2011 biography of Bismarck wrote that he was:

a political genius of a very unusual kind [whose success] rested on several sets of conflicting characteristics among which brutal, disarming honesty mingled with the wiles and deceits of a confidence man. He played his parts with perfect self-confidence, yet mixed them with rage, anxiety, illness, hypochondria, and irrationality. ... He used democracy when it suited him, negotiated with revolutionaries and the dangerous Ferdinand Lassalle, the socialist who might have contested his authority. He utterly dominated his cabinet ministers with a sovereign contempt and blackened their reputations as soon as he no longer needed them. He outwitted the parliamentary parties, even the strongest of them, and betrayed all those ... who had put him into power. By 1870 even his closest friends ... realised that they had helped put a demonic figure into power.

During most of his nearly thirty-year-long tenure, Bismarck held undisputed control over the government's policies. He was well supported by his friend Albrecht von Roon, the war minister, as well as the leader of the Prussian Army Helmuth von Moltke. Bismarck's diplomatic moves relied on a victorious Prussian military, and these two men gave Bismarck the victories he needed to convince the smaller German states to join Prussia.

Bismarck took steps to silence or restrain political opposition, as evidenced by laws restricting the freedom of the press, and the anti-socialist laws. He waged a culture war (Kulturkampf) against the Catholic Church. He was losing when he realised the conservatism of the Catholics made them natural allies against the Socialists. He then switched positions, winning Catholic/Centre support and opposing the liberals. Wilhelm I rarely challenged the chancellor's decisions; on several occasions, Bismarck obtained his monarch's approval by threatening to resign. However, Wilhelm II intended to govern the country himself, making the ousting of Bismarck one of his first tasks as Kaiser. Bismarck's successors as chancellor were much less influential, as power was concentrated in the emperor's hands.

=== Memorials ===
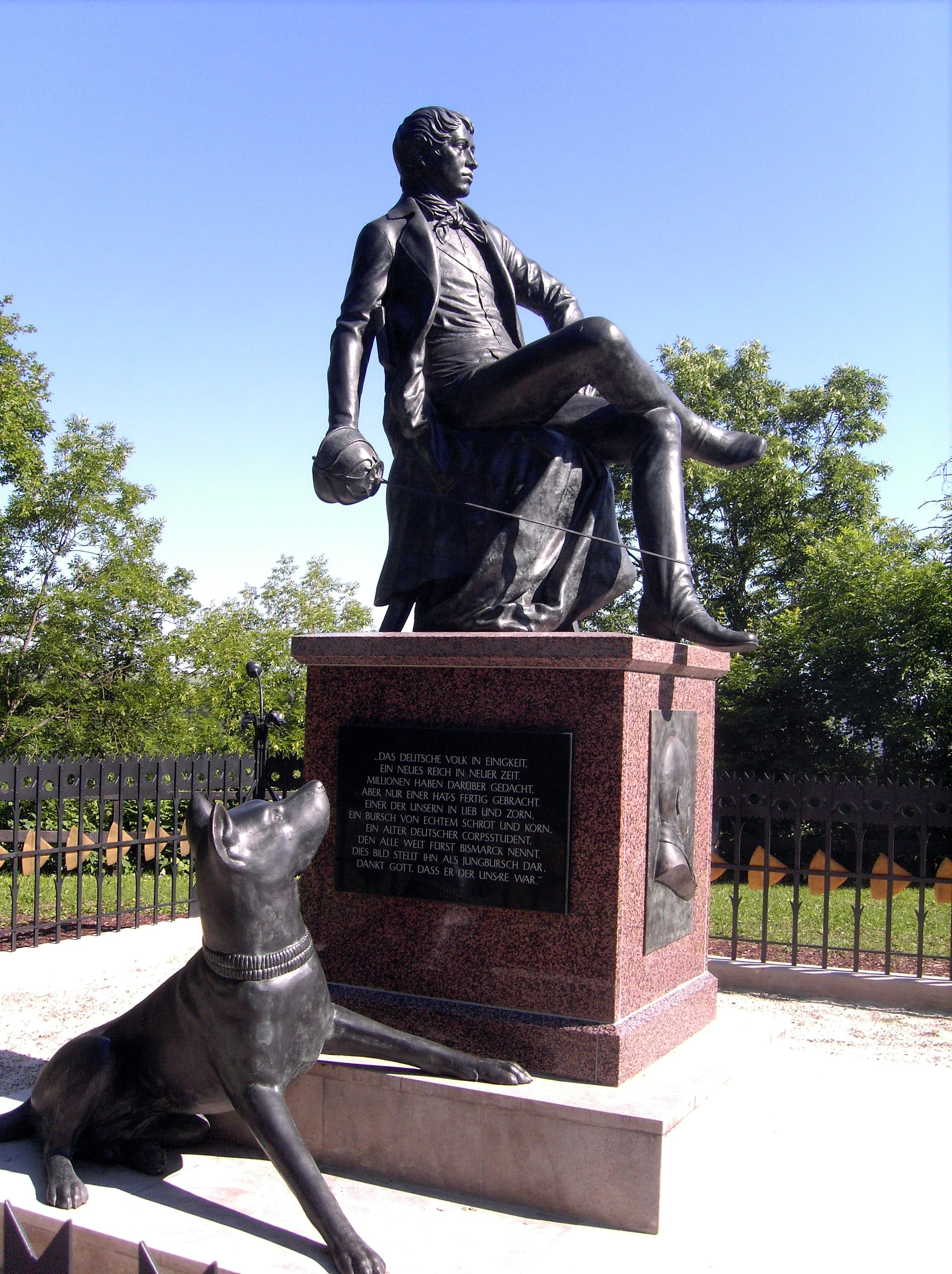
Memorial to the young Bismarck at the Rudelsburg in Saxony-Anhalt

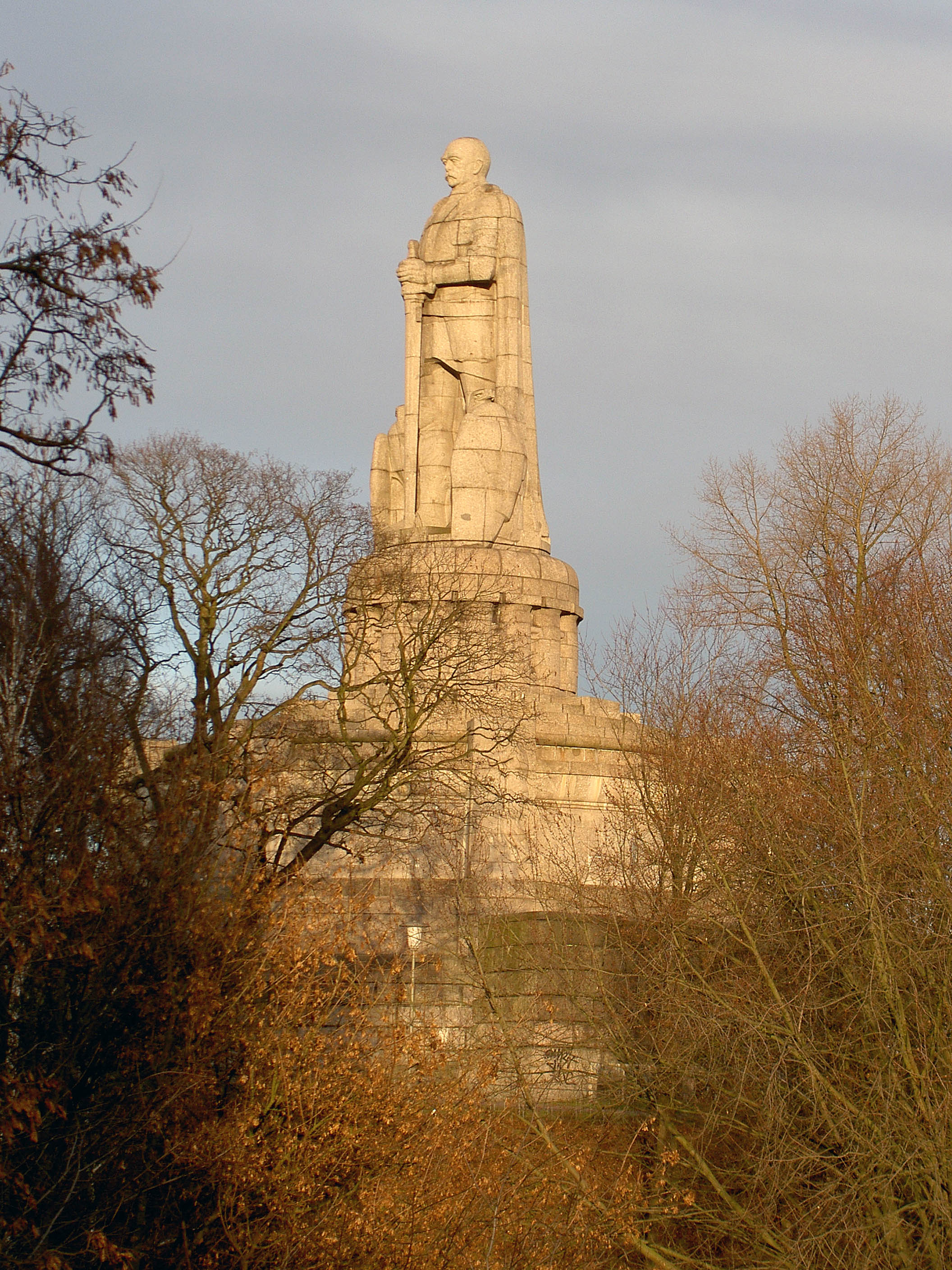
The Bismarck Monument, Hamburg

Immediately after he left office, citizens started to praise him and established funds to build monuments like the Bismarck Memorial or towers dedicated to him. Throughout Germany, the accolades were unending; several buildings were named in his honour, portraits of him were commissioned from artists such as Franz von Lenbach and C.W. Allers and books about him became best-sellers. The first monument built in his honour was the one at Bad Kissingen erected in 1877.

Numerous statues and memorials dot the cities, towns, and countryside of Germany, including the famous Bismarck Memorial in Berlin and numerous Bismarck towers on four continents. The only memorial depicting him as a student at Göttingen University (together with a dog, possibly his Reichshund Tyras) and as a member of his Corps Hannovera was re-erected in 2006 at the Rudelsburg.

The gleaming white 1906 Bismarck Monument in the city of Hamburg, stands in the centre of the St. Pauli district, and is the largest, and probably best-known, memorial to Bismarck worldwide. The statues depicted him as massive, monolithic, rigid and unambiguous. Two warships were named in his honour, the SMS Bismarck of the German Imperial Navy, and the Bismarck from the World War II era.

=== Memory and myth ===
Bismarck was the most memorable figure in Germany down to the 1930s. The dominant memory was the great hero of the 1860s, who defeated all enemies, especially France, and unified Germany to become the most powerful military and diplomatic force in the world. Of course, there were no monuments celebrating Bismarck's devotion to the cause of European peace after 1871. But there were other German memories. His fellow Junkers were disappointed, as Prussia after 1871 became swallowed up and dominated by the German Empire. Liberal intellectuals, few in number but dominant in the universities and business houses, celebrated his achievement of the national state, a constitutional monarchy, and the rule of law, forestalling revolution and marginalising radicalism. Social Democrats and labour leaders had always been his target, and he remained their bête noire. Catholics could not forget the Kulturkampf and remained distrustful. Especially negative were the Poles who hated his Germanisation programs.

Robert Gerwarth shows that the Bismarck myth, built up predominantly during his years of retirement and even more stridently after his death, proved a powerful rhetorical and ideological tool. The myth made him out to be a dogmatic ideologue and ardent nationalist when, in fact, he was ideologically flexible. Gerwarth argues that this constructed memory of Bismarck played a central role between 1918 and the early 1930s as an antidemocratic myth in Germany's ideological battles over its history. This myth was a weapon against the Weimar Republic and exercised a destructive influence on the political culture of the first German democracy. Frankel in Bismarck's Shadow (2005) shows the Bismarck cult fostered and legitimised a new style of right-wing politics. It made possible the post-Bismarckian crisis of leadership, both real and perceived, that had Germans seeking the strongest possible leader and asking, "What Would Bismarck Do?" For example, Hamburg's memorial unveiled in 1906, is considered one of the greatest expressions of Imperial Germany's Bismarck cult and an important development in the history of German memorial art. It was a product of the desire of Hamburg's patrician classes to defend their political privileges in the face of dramatic social change and attendant demands for political reform. To those who presided over its construction, the monument was also a means of asserting Hamburg's cultural aspirations and of shrugging off a reputation as a city hostile to the arts. The memorial was greeted with widespread disapproval among the working classes and did not prevent their increasing support for the Social Democrats.

=== Place names ===
A number of localities around the world have been named in Bismarck's honour. They include:

- Bismarck Archipelago, near the former German colony of New Guinea.
- Bismarck, Illinois
- Bismarck, North Dakota, the only U.S. state capital named for a foreign statesman.
- Bismarck, Missouri, a city in Missouri.
- Bismarck Sea
- Bismarck Strait, a channel in Antarctica.
- Cape Bismarck, NE Greenland.
- Bismarck Range, a mountain range in Papua New Guinea.

== Honours and arms ==
Arms of Otto, Prince Bismarck

=== Titles ===
Bismarck was created Graf von Bismarck-Schönhausen ("Count of Bismarck-Schönhausen") in 1865 and Fürst von Bismarck ("Prince of Bismarck") in 1871. In 1890, he was granted the title of Herzog von Lauenburg ("Duke of Lauenburg"); the duchy was one of the territories that Prussia had seized from the king of Denmark in 1864.

It was Bismarck's lifelong ambition to be assimilated into the mediatised houses of Germany. He attempted to persuade Kaiser Wilhelm I that he should be endowed with the sovereign Duchy of Saxe-Lauenburg, in reward for his services to the imperial family and the German Empire. This was on the understanding that Bismarck would immediately restore the duchy to Prussia; all he wanted was the status and privileges of a mediatised family for himself and his descendants. This novel idea was rejected by the conservative emperor, who thought that he had already given the chancellor enough rewards. There is reason to believe that he informed Wilhelm II of his wishes; after being forced by the sovereign to resign, he received the purely honorific title of "Duke of Lauenburg", without the duchy itself and the sovereignty that would have transformed his family into a mediatised house. Bismarck regarded it as a mockery of his ambition, and he considered nothing crueller than this action of the emperor.

=== Honours ===
Domestic orders and decorations

- Prussia:
  - Lifesaving Medal, 13 December 1842
  - Grand Cross of the Red Eagle, with Oak Leaves, 17 March 1863; with Crown, Scepter and Swords, 1878
  - Knight of the Black Eagle, 21 November 1864; with Collar, 1865; in Brilliants, 1873
  - Knight's Cross of the Royal House Order of Hohenzollern, with Swords, 1866; Grand Commander's Cross with Star, 28 July 1866; in Brilliants, 1873
  - Commander of Honour of the Johanniter Order, 1868
  - Pour le Mérite, with Oak Leaves, 1 September 1884 (military)/20 January 1896 (civil)
  - Iron Cross (1870), 1st Class with 2nd Class on Black Band; with Oak Leaves and Jubilee Clip, 1895
  - Knight of the Wilhelm-Orden, with Collar, 1896
  - Landwehr Service Medal, 1st Class
- Ascanian duchies: Grand Cross of the Order of Albert the Bear, 20 December 1862
- Baden: Knight of the House Order of Fidelity, 1869; with Golden Collar in Brilliants, 1871
- Bavaria: Knight of St. Hubert, with Star in Brilliants, 1866
- Brunswick: Grand Cross of the Order of Henry the Lion, 1867
- Ernestine duchies: Grand Cross of the Saxe-Ernestine House Order, with Collar, September 1866
- Hanover: Grand Cross of the Royal Guelphic Order, 1857
- Hesse-Kassel: Knight of the Golden Lion, 1 July 1865
- Hesse-Darmstadt:
  - Grand Cross of the Merit Order of Philip the Magnanimous, with Swords, 7 January 1855
  - Grand Cross of the Ludwig Order, 9 March 1871
- Mecklenburg: Grand Cross of the Wendish Crown, with Crown in Gold
- Oldenburg: Grand Cross of the Order of Duke Peter Friedrich Ludwig, with Crown in Gold, 24 October 1866; with Swords, 31 December 1870
- Saxe-Weimar-Eisenach: Grand Cross of the White Falcon, 3 September 1866; in Brilliants, 1885
- Saxony: Knight of the Rue Crown, 1868; in Brilliants, 1885
- Württemberg: Grand Cross of the Württemberg Crown, in Brilliants, 1871

Foreign orders and decorations

- Austrian Empire:
  - Knight of the Iron Crown, 1st Class, 1853
  - Grand Cross of the Royal Hungarian Order of St. Stephen, 1864; in Brilliants, 1872
- Belgium: Grand Cordon of the Order of Leopold (civil), 25 June 1863
- Denmark: Grand Cross of the Dannebrog, 11 June 1852
- Ethiopia: Grand Cross of the Star of Ethiopia
- France: Grand Cross of the Legion of Honour, May 1865
- Greece: Grand Cross of the Redeemer
- Italy: Knight of the Supreme Order of the Most Holy Annunciation, 13 January 1867
- Japan: Grand Cordon of the Order of the Chrysanthemum, 17 June 1882
- Netherlands: Grand Cross of the Netherlands Lion
- Luxembourg: Grand Cross of the Oak Crown
- Ottoman Empire:
  - Order of Distinction, in Brilliants
  - Order of Osmanieh, 1st Class in Brilliants
- Tunisia: Husainid Family Order
- Persia:
  - Order of the Lion and the Sun, 1st Class
  - Order of the August Portrait, in Brilliants
- Portugal: Grand Cross of the Tower and Sword
- Romania: Grand Cross of the Star of Romania
- Russia:
  - Knight of St. Alexander Nevsky, March 1862
  - Knight of St. Andrew the Apostle the First-called, in Brilliants, 5 June 1867
  - Knight of St. Anna, 1st Class
  - Knight of St. Stanislaus, 1st Class
  - Knight of the White Eagle
- Siam:
  - Grand Cross of the White Elephant
  - Grand Cross of the Order of Chula Chom Klao
- San Marino: Grand Cross of the Order of San Marino
- Serbia: Grand Cross of the White Eagle
- Spain: Knight of the Golden Fleece, 6 March 1875
- Sweden-Norway: Knight of the Seraphim, 31 May 1875
- Zanzibar: Knight of the Brilliant Star of Zanzibar, 1st Class (Princely Class)

Military appointments

- À la suite of the 7th (Magdeburg) Cuirassiers "von Seydlitz", 18 October 1868; Colonel-in-chief, 26 April 1894

== See also ==
- Bismarck towers
- Conservatism in Germany
- Gerson von Bleichröder, Bismarck's banker and economics advisor
- House of Bismarck
- Landtag of Prussia
- Workers and Farmers Pensions

== Bibliography ==
=== Biographies ===
- Abrams, Lynn (1995). Bismarck and the German Empire, 1871–1918. Routledge. ISBN 978-0415363099.
- Crankshaw, Edward (1981). Bismarck. Viking Press. ISBN 978-0-670-16982-5.
- Rich, Norman (9 January 1982). "Sinking the Bismarck Legend". The Washington Post. Archived from the original on 25 December 2020.
- Darmstaedter, Friedrich (2008). Bismarck and the Creation of the Second Reich. Russel & Russel. ISBN 978-0-8462-0624-8.
- Engelberg, Ernst (1986–1990). Bismarck (in German). Vol. 1–2. Fayard. ISBN 978-3-8275-0024-3.
- Eyck, Erich (1964). Bismarck and the German Empire. W. W. Norton & Company; 1st edition. ISBN 978-0-393-00235-5.
- Feuchtwanger, Edgar (2002). Bismarck. Historical Biographies. Routledge. ISBN 978-0-415-21613-5.
- Gall, Lothar (1986a). Bismarck: The White Revolutionary. Vol. 1. Allen & Unwin. ISBN 978-0-04-445778-7.
- Gall, Lothar (1986b). Bismarck: The White Revolutionary. Vol. 2. Trans. J. A. Underwood. Allen & Unwin. ISBN 978-0-04-445779-4.; online
- Headlam, James Wycliffe (1899). Bismarck and the Foundation of the German Empire. IndyPublish. ISBN 978-1-4142-3271-3.
- Heuston, Kimberley Burton (2010). Otto von Bismarck: Iron Chancellor of Germany. A Wicked History. Franklin Watts. ISBN 978-0-531-22824-1. for middle school students
- Hollyday, F. B. M. (1970). Bismarck. Great Lives Observed. Prentice-Hall. ISBN 978-0-13-077362-3.
- Kent, George O. (1978). Bismarck and His Times. Southern Illinois University Press. ISBN 978-0-8093-0859-0.
- Lerman, Katharine Anne. (2004). Bismarck: Profiles in Power. Longman. ISBN 978-0-582-03740-3.
- Ludwig, Emil (1927). Wilhelm Hohenzollern: The last of the Kaisers. Trans. Ethel Colburn Mayne. New York: Kessinger Publishing, LLC. ISBN 978-0-7661-4341-8.
- Ludwig, Emil (1927). Bismarck: The Story of a Fighter. Skyhorse Publishing. ISBN 978-1-62087-176-8. Popular biography.
- Palmer, Alan (1976). Bismarck. New York: Charles Scribner Publishers.
- Pflanze, Otto (1971). Bismarck and the Development of Germany: The Period of Unification, 1815–1871. Vol. 1. Princeton University Press. ISBN 978-0-691-00765-6.
- Pflanze, Otto (1990) [1963]. Bismarck and the Development of Germany: The Period of Consolidation, 1871–1880. Vol. 2. Princeton University Press. ISBN 978-0-691-05588-6.
- Pflanze, Otto (April 1955). "Bismarck and German Nationalism". American Historical Review. 60 (3): 548–566. doi:10.2307/1845577. JSTOR 1845577.
- Quinault, Roland. "Bismarck and Gladstone Beyond Caricature" History Today (Nov 2013) 63#11 pp 21–28 online; compares the two in terms of private and public lives
- Robertson, Charles Grant (1919). Bismarck. London: Constable and Company. ISBN 978-1-357-14279-7. Online review calls it best study in any language.
- Steinberg, Jonathan (2011a). Bismarck: A Life. Oxford University Press. ISBN 978-0-19-997539-6.
- Steinberg, Jonathan (2011b). Bismarck: A Life. Oxford University Press. ISBN 978-0-19-978252-9.
  - Kissinger, Henry A. (31 March 2011). "Otto von Bismarck, Master Statesman". The New York Times (book review). Archived from the original on 8 March 2021.
- Stern, Fritz (1979). Gold and Iron: Bismarck, Bleichröder and the Building of the German Empire. Vintage. ISBN 978-0-394-74034-8.
- Taylor, A.J.P. (1955) [1955]. Bismarck: the Man and the Statesman. New York: Alfred A Knopf. ISBN 978-0-394-70387-9.

=== Surveys ===
- Berghahn, Volker (1994). Imperial Germany, 1871–1914: Economy, Society, Culture and Politics. Berghahn Books. ISBN 978-1-84545-011-3.
- Blackbourn, David (1998). History of Germany, 1780–1918: The Long Nineteenth Century (Revised second ed.). Blackwell. ISBN 978-0-631-23196-7.
- Clark, Christopher (2009). Iron Kingdom: The Rise and Downfall of Prussia, 1600–1947. Belknap Press. ISBN 978-0-674-03196-8.
- Craig, Gordon A. (1978). Germany, 1866–1945. Oxford University Press. ISBN 978-0-19-502724-2.
- Holborn, Hajo (1969). "Bismarck and the Consolidation of the German Empire, 1871–1890". The History of Modern Germany 1840–1945. Princeton University Press. pp. 233–297. ISBN 978-0-691-00797-7.
- Holborn, Hajo (1982). The History of Modern Germany 1840–1945. Princeton University Press. ISBN 978-0-691-00797-7.
- Holborn, Hajo (1982). "The Constitutional Conflict in Prussia and the Early Years of the Bismarck Ministry". The History of Modern Germany 1840–1945. Vol. 3. pp. 131–172.
- Holborn, Hajo (1982). "The Founding of the New German Empire, 1865–1871". The History of Modern Germany 1840–1945. pp. 173–229.
- Langer, William L. (1964). European Alliances and Alignments, 1871–1890, 2nd Edition. New York, Knopf.
- Retallack, James N. (2008). Imperial Germany, 1871–1918. Oxford University Press. ISBN 978-0-19-920487-8.
- Robinson, Janet; Robinson, Joe (2009). Handbook of Imperial Germany. AuthorHouse. ISBN 978-1-4490-2113-9.
- Sheehan, James J. (1989). German History, 1770–1866 (Reprint ed.). Clarendon Press. ISBN 978-0-19-820432-9.
- Sheehan, James J. (1978). German liberalism in the ninetury century. University of Chicago Press; ACLS. hdl:2027/heb.01317.0001.001. ISBN 9780226752082.

=== Specialized studies ===
- Brandenburg, Erich (1933). From Bismarck to the World War: A History of German Foreign Policy 1870–1914 (Reprint ed.). Howard Fertig Publisher. ISBN 978-0-86527-422-8. Archived from the original on 15 March 2017.
- Carroll, E. Malcolm (1975). Germany and the great powers, 1866–1914: A Study in Public Opinion and Foreign Policy. Octagon Books. ISBN 978-0-374-91299-4.
- Clark, Chester Wells (1934). Franz Joseph and Bismarck: The Diplomacy of Austria before the War of 1866. Cambridge, MA: Harvard University Press. ASIN B0006BUIOG.
- Field, W. G. (October 1898). "Bismarck's First School". The Journal of Education. 20: 603–604.
- Goddard, Stacie E. (2008). "When Right Makes Might: How Prussia Overturned the European Balance of Power". International Security. 33 (3 Winter): 110–142. doi:10.1162/isec.2009.33.3.110. JSTOR 40207143. S2CID 57563017.
- Gross, Michael B. (2005). The War against Catholicism: Liberalism and the Anti-Catholic Imagination in Nineteenth-Century Germany (New ed.). University of Michigan Press. ISBN 978-0-472-03130-6.
- Hennock, E. P. (2007). The Origin of the Welfare State in England and Germany, 1850–1914: Social Policies Compared. Cambridge: Cambridge University Press. ISBN 978-0-521-59770-8.
- Hennock, E. P. (2003). "Social Policy in the Bismarck Era: A Progress Report". German History. 21 (2): 229–238. doi:10.1191/0266355403gh283xx. Archived from the original on 6 June 2012.
- Howard, Michael (1991) [1961]. The Franco-Prussian War: The German invasion of France, 1870–1871 (2nd ed.). Routledge. ISBN 978-0-415-26671-0.
- Kennedy, Paul M. (1988). The Rise of the Anglo-German Antagonism, 1860–1914. Humanity Books. ISBN 1-57392-301-X.
- Kissinger, Henry A. (1968). "The White Revolutionary: Reflections on Bismarck" (PDF). Daedalus. 97 (3, Philosophers and Kings: Studies in Leadership). MIT Press: 888–924. JSTOR 20023844. Archived from the original (PDF) on 24 June 2021.
- Lord, Robert H. (1923). "Bismarck and Russia in 1863". American Historical Review. 29 (1): 2–48. doi:10.2307/1839273. JSTOR 1839273.
- Medlicott, W. N. (1945). "Bismarck and the Three Emperors' Alliance, 1881-1887". Transactions of the Royal Historical Society. 27: 61–83. doi:10.2307/3678575. JSTOR 3678575. S2CID 154285570.
- Mork, Gordon R. (1971). "Bismarck and the 'Capitulation' of German Liberalism". Journal of Modern History. 43 (1): 59–75. doi:10.1086/240588. JSTOR 1877926. S2CID 144213711.
- Paur, Philip (1981). "The Corporatist Character of Bismarck's Social Policy". European History Quarterly. 11 (4): 427–460. doi:10.1177/026569148101100401. S2CID 144764469.
- Rich, Norman. "The Question Of National Interest In Imperial German Foreign Policy: Bismarck, William II, and the Road to World War I." Naval War College Review (1973) 26#1: 28-41. online
- Ross, Ronald J. (1998). The Failure of Bismarck's Kulturkampf: Catholicism and State Power in Imperial Germany, 1871–1887. The Catholic University of America Press. ISBN 978-0-8132-0894-7.
- Stone, James (2012). "Bismarck Ante Portas! Germany and the Seize Mai Crisis of 1877". Diplomacy & Statecraft. 23 (2): 209–235. doi:10.1080/09592296.2012.679466. S2CID 154500799.
- Stone, James (1994). "Bismarck and the Containment of France, 1873–1877". Canadian Journal of History. 29 (2): 281–304. doi:10.3138/cjh.29.2.281. Archived from the original on 14 December 2014.
- Thomson, Henry. "Landholding Inequality, Political Strategy, and Authoritarian Repression: Structure and Agency in Bismarck's 'Second Founding' of the German Empire." Studies in Comparative International Development 50.1 (2015): 73–97. cites
- Thümmler, Heinzpeter (1979). Sozialistengesetz §28: Ausweisungen und Ausgewiesene 1878–1890 [Socialist Law §28: Expulsions and Expellees 1878–1890] (in German). Berlin / Leiden: De Gruyter. doi:10.1515/9783112735114. ISBN 978-3-112-73510-7.
- Vagts, Alfred. "Land and Sea Power in the Second German Reich." Journal of Military History 3.4 (1939): 210+ online
- Waller, Bruce (1974). Bismarck at the Crossroads. The Reorientation of German Foreign Policy after the Congress of Berlin 1878–1880. The Athlone Press. ISBN 978-0-485-13135-2.
- Wawro, Geoffrey (2005). The Franco-Prussian War: The German Conquest of France in 1870–1871. Cambridge University Press. ISBN 978-0-521-61743-7.
- Wawro, Geoffrey (2012). "The War Scare of 1875: Bismarck and Europe in the Mid-1870s". German History. 30 (1): 140–141. doi:10.1093/gerhis/ghr079.
- Wehler, Hans-Ulrich (1970). "Bismarck's Imperialism 1862–1890". Past and Present (48): 119–155. doi:10.1093/past/48.1.119. JSTOR 650484.
- Wetzel, David (2012). A Duel of Nations: Germany, France, and the Diplomacy of the War of 1870–1871. University of Wisconsin Press. ISBN 978-0-299-29134-1.
- Wetzel, David (2001). A Duel of Giants: Bismarck, Napoleon III, and the Origins of the Franco-Prussian War. University of Wisconsin Press. ISBN 978-0-299-17490-3.

=== Historiography and memory ===
- Andrews, Herbert D. "Bismarck's Foreign Policy and German Historiography, 1919-1945" Journal of Modern History (1965) 37#3 pp. 345–356 online
- Barkin, Kenneth. "Bismarck in a Postmodern World." German Studies Review 18.2 (1995): 241–251. online
- Cowen, Ron (30 January 2012). "Restored Edison Records Revive Giants of 19th-Century Germany". The New York Times. Archived from the original on 12 June 2018.
- Frankel, Richard E. (2003). "From the Beer Halls to the Halls of Power: The Cult of Bismarck and the Legitimization of a New German Right, 1898–1945". German Studies Review. 26 (3): 543–560. doi:10.2307/1432746. JSTOR 1432746.
- Frankel, Richard E (2005). Bismarck's Shadow. The Cult of Leadership and the Transformation of the German Right, 1898–1945. Berg Publishers. ISBN 978-1-84520-033-6.
- Gerwarth, Robert, and Lucy Riall. "Fathers of the nation? Bismarck, Garibaldi and the cult of memory in Germany and Italy." European History Quarterly 39.3 (2009): 388-413.
- Gerwarth, Robert (2007). "Inventing the Iron Chancellor". History Today. 57 (6): 43–49.
- Gerwarth, Robert (2005). The Bismarck Myth: Weimar Germany and the Legacy of the Iron Chancellor. Clarendon Press. ISBN 978-0-19-923689-3.
- Geyer, Michael, and Konrad H. Jarausch. "Great Men and Postmodern Ruptures: Overcoming the" Belatedness" of German Historiography." German Studies Review 18.2 (1995): 253-273. online
- Hamerow, Theodore S. (1993). Otto von Bismarck and Imperial Germany: A Historical Assessment (2nd ed.). D C Heath & Co. ISBN 978-0-669-29444-6.
- Müller, Frank Lorenz (2008). "Man, Myth and Monuments: The Legacy of Otto von Bismarck (1866–1998)". European History Quarterly. 38 (4): 626–636. doi:10.1177/0265691408094517. S2CID 220916743.
- Pearce, Robert (2010). "The Austro-Prussian War". History Review (66).
- Russell, Mark A. (2000). "The Building of Hamburg's Bismarck Memorial, 1898–1906". The Historical Journal. 43 (1): 133–156. doi:10.1017/S0018246X99008961. JSTOR 3021016. S2CID 154544615.
- Spencer, Frank. "Bismarck And The Franco-Prussian War" History 40#140 (1955), pp. 319–325 online historiography
- Steefel, Lawrence D. (1930). "Bismarck". Journal of Modern History. 2 (1): 74–95. doi:10.1086/235557. JSTOR 1871140. S2CID 222424868.
- Stürmer, Michael (1971). "Bismarck in Perspective". Central European History. 4 (4): 291–331. doi:10.1017/S0008938900015399. JSTOR 4545614. S2CID 145110759.
- Urbach, Karina (1998). "Between Saviour and Villain: 100 Years of Bismarck Biographies". Historical Journal. 41 (4): 1141–1160. doi:10.1017/s0018246x98008206. JSTOR 3020865. S2CID 159641867.

=== Primary sources ===
- Bismarck, Otto von (1899). Bismarck: The Man and the Statesman. Translated by Taylor, A. J. P. (1955 ed.). New York: Hamish Hamilton.
- Bismarck, Otto von (1898). Bismarck: The Man and the Statesman (Memoirs). Vol. II. Translated by Butler, A.J. (1898 ed.). Smith, Elder & Co.
- Hohenzollern, William I; Bismarck, Otto von (1903). The Correspondence of William I. and Bismarck: With Other Letters from and to Prince Bismarck. Translated by Ford, J. A. New York: Stokes.
- Coveney, Dorothy Kathleen; Medlicott, William Norton (1971). Bismarck and Europe. Hodder Arnold. ISBN 978-0-312-08225-3.

Otto, 1st Prince of Bismarck House of Bismarck-Schönhausen Cadet branch of the House of Bismarck Born: 1 April 1815 Died: 30 July 1898
German nobility
New title	Prince of Bismarck; 21 March 1871 – 30 July 1898	Succeeded by Herbert von Bismarck
Political offices
Preceded by Adolf zu Hohenlohe-Ingelfingen	Minister President of Prussia; 1862–1873	Succeeded by Albrecht von Roon
Confederation established	Chancellor of the North German Confederation; 1867–1871	Confederation abolished German Empire proclaimed
Preceded by Albrecht von Bernstorff	Foreign Minister of Prussia; 1862–1890	Succeeded by Leo von Caprivi
New title	Chancellor of Germany; 1871–1890	Succeeded by Leo von Caprivi
Preceded by Albrecht von Roon	Minister President of Prussia; 1873–1890	Succeeded by Leo von Caprivi
