= Gottfried von Bismarck =

German businessman and nobleman (1962–2007)

Count Gottfried von Bismarck
- Born: Gottfried Alexander Leopold Graf von Bismarck-Schönhausen; 19 September 1962; Uccle, Belgium
- Died: 29 June 2007 (aged 44); London, England
- Noble family: House of Bismarck
- Father: Ferdinand, Prince of Bismarck
- Mother: Countess Elisabeth Lippens

Count Gottfried Alexander Leopold von Bismarck-Schönhausen (Gottfried Alexander Leopold Graf von Bismarck-Schönhausen in German; 19 September 1962 – 29 June 2007) was a German businessman, socialite and member of the princely German House of Bismarck. Bismarck was noted for his flamboyant lifestyle that some called ‘dissolute’ after he died, and his homes were linked to two deaths from narcotics, but he was not found responsible for either. He died of a cocaine overdose in 2007.

== Family ==
Born in Uccle, Belgium, Gottfried von Bismarck-Schönhausen was the second son of Ferdinand, Prince von Bismarck and grandson of Otto, Prince von Bismarck, a diplomat at Germany's embassy in London until a feud with Third Reich foreign minister Joachim von Ribbentrop. He was the great-great-grandson of German Chancellor Otto von Bismarck.

Bismarck's great uncle and namesake Count Gottfried was a Nazi official who may have been part of the 20 July plot to assassinate Adolf Hitler. His younger sister Vanessa Gräfin von Bismarck-Schönhausen (born 26 March 1971, Hamburg) is a public relations agent in the United States. His elder brother Carl-Eduard Fürst von Bismarck-Schönhausen (born 1961) was a member (MP) of the German Bundestag. His younger brother Count Gregor von Bismarck-Schönhausen (born 1964) became the heir of the family estates according to the will of his father.

== Early life and education ==
Bismarck grew up primarily in his family's ancestral estate near Hamburg. He attended school in Germany and Switzerland, had a brief internship at the New York Stock Exchange, then enrolled at Christ Church, Oxford University, where he studied Philosophy, Politics and Economics (PPE) earning a third class honours degree. He was a member of the exclusive Piers Gaveston Society, "noted for its predilection for rubber wear and whips, which he embellished with his androgynous apparel and lipstick", as well as the prohibitively expensive Bullingdon Club, known for its members' wealth and destructive binges, alongside friends like Darius Guppy. Confessing that he did not enjoy the typical social life in Oxford, he and his friends escaped to the wild, fashionable parties in London at the weekends or whenever possible. He reportedly drank heavily at night and took amphetamines by day to concentrate on his studies.

== Narcotics incident at university ==
The death of heiress Olivia Channon, the daughter of the English Conservative politician Paul Channon, had a devastating effect on Bismarck's life. She had been found dead from a heroin overdose in his rooms at Christ Church in 1986, but he was not present at the time. Bismarck was charged with drug possession and fined £80 at an Oxford Magistrates Court. The shadow of Channon's death haunted him, and he was said to have "wept like a child" at her funeral. His father Prince Ferdinand recalled him to Germany for treatment at a private clinic, and it was said he left Oxford so quickly that a family servant had to settle his bills with pubs, tailors and restaurants.

== Business career ==
After completion of his studies at a German university, where he wrote a doctoral thesis on the East German telephone system, Bismarck visited the family estate at Schönhausen, which was lost under communist rule in East Germany. This was a powerful personal experience for him. Later, after having spent some time in Los Angeles, he went to work as an executive for the now defunct Telemonde with the intent to raise capital from the stock market before its collapse in 2002. He returned to London soon after and became a promoter of holidays in Uzbekistan. He was a co-founding executive with AIM Partners, a London-based investment firm. However, his father often had to settle his debts.

== Narcotics incident 2006 ==
In August 2006, Anthony Casey, 41, fell 20 m (60 ft) from Bismarck's flat in Chelsea and died. Bismarck was not arrested and the police said there were no drugs found in his flat. Nevertheless, the event re-awakened the so-called "curse" from the past and triggered speculation from the tabloids. The coroner's report had found no alcohol in Casey's body, but did find a significant amount of cocaine.

The coroner Dr Paul Knapman told The Guardian that a great deal of sexual paraphernalia was discovered in the flat, including sex toys and lubricants. "In common parlance, in the early hours of the morning, there was a gay orgy going on", Dr. Knapman told the newspaper. "Nevertheless, this was conducted by consenting males in private." The claim that a "gay orgy" took place was officially denied by Bismarck.

== Death ==
In early 2007, Bismarck discreetly moved in with an old friend on Portobello Road, Notting Hill. He had been heard to say that he was deeply saddened that his life had brought so much shame upon his family. Friends were relieved he was making such a concerted effort to clean up his life and that he was being helped to start afresh in a new environment. On 2 July 2007, he was found dead in the almost empty £5 million flat, which was in the process of being sold. He was 44 years old. An inquest into the circumstances was opened on 6 July 2007. Sebastien Lucas, the pathologist who carried out the post-mortem examination, said that Bismarck had been injecting cocaine on an hourly basis on the day before his death, and that his body contained the highest level of cocaine that he had ever seen, as well as morphine; he also had liver damage, hepatitis B, hepatitis C, and HIV.

== Ancestry ==
Ancestors of Gottfried von Bismarck

16. Prince Otto Eduard von Bismarck
8. Prince Herbert von Bismarck
17. Johanna von Puttkamer
4. Prince Otto Christian von Bismarck
18. Count Georg Anton of Hoyos
9. Countess Marguerite Malvine of Hoyos
19. Alice Whitehead
2. Prince Ferdinand von Bismarck
20. Captain Sven Justus Tengbom
10. Ivar Justus Tengbom
21. Agnes Carolina Almqvist
5. Ann-Mari Tengbom
22. Lars August Nordin
11. Hjördis Frederika Nordin
23. Ida Josefina Hansson
1. Count Gottfried von Bismarck
24. Auguste Philippe Marie Lippens
12. Raymond Lippens
25. Marie Ghislaine t'Serstevens
6. Count Léon Lippens
26. Baron Léon Marie de Béthune
13. Baroness Ghislaine de Béthune
27. Anne Jeanne David-Fischbach-Malacord
3. Countess Elisabeth Lippens
28. Hippolyte Philippe Marie Lippens
14. Count Maurice Auguste Lippens
29. Countess Louise de Kerchove de Denterghem
7. Countess Suzanne Lippens
30. Henri Édouard Auguste Peltzer
15. Madeleine Peltzer
31. Suzanne Amélie Orban

== See also ==
- Mona von Bismarck
- Carl-Eduard von Bismarck
