= House of Bismarck =

German noble family

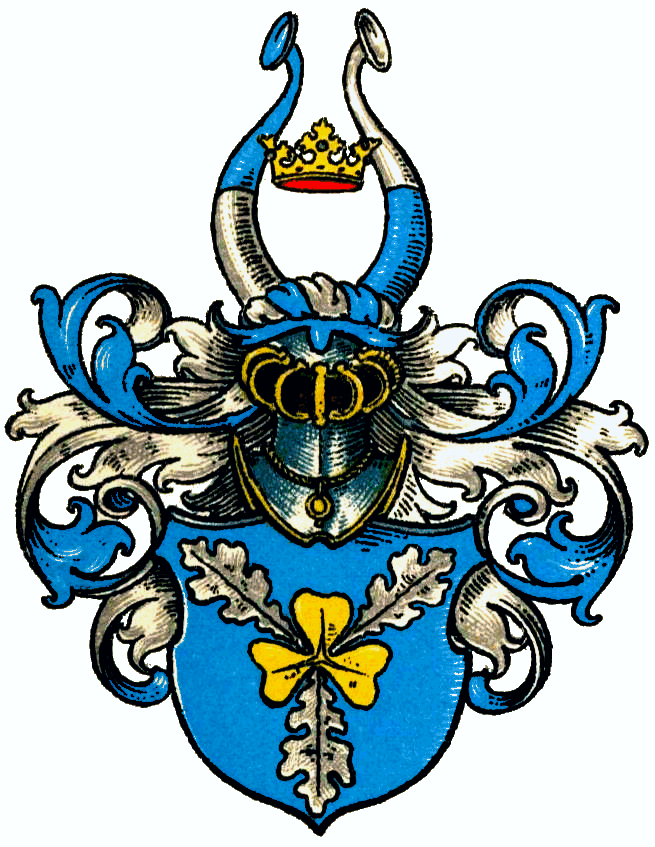
- Bismarck coat of arms
- Country: Germany
- Founded: c. 1270
- Founder: Herebord von Bismarck
- Current head: Jkr. Ulrich-Achatz von Bismarck (head of the Briest line, and thus head of the house of Bismarck by primogeniture); Carl-Eduard, Prince of Bismarck (head of the Princely line)
- Titles: Duke of Lauenburg; Prince of Bismarck; Count of Bismarck-Schönhausen; Junker

The House of Bismarck is a German noble family, a member of the Uradel, that rose to prominence in the 19th century, largely through the achievements of the statesman Otto von Bismarck. He was granted a hereditary comital title in 1865, the hereditary title of Prince of Bismarck in 1871, and the non-hereditary title of Duke of Lauenburg in 1890. Several of Otto von Bismarck's descendants, notably his elder son Herbert, Prince of Bismarck, have also been politicians.

== History ==
The family has its roots in the Altmark region, descending from Herebord von Bismarck (d. 1280), the first verifiable holder of the name, mentioned about 1270 as an official (Schultheiß) at the city of Stendal in the Margraviate of Brandenburg. His descent from the nearby small town of Bismark is conceivable though not ascertained. Herebord was head of the Dressmakers' Guild.

During the following two generations, the family seems to have gained knightly status. Herebord's great-grandson, Nicolaus (Klaus) von Bismarck, mentioned in 1328 and 1377, was a councillor and a loyal supporter of the Wittelsbach margrave Louis I, over which he fell out with the revolting Stendal citizens and was compensated with the manor and estate of Burgstall in 1345. Also part of this estate were the villages of Briest and Döbbelin, which later became the seats of two family branches.

By an agreement in 1562 with the Hohenzollern margraves, the Bismarcks swapped Burgstall with Schönhausen and Fischbeck, located east of the Elbe river and formerly part of the Archbishopric of Magdeburg, which also had been under Hohenzollern rule since 1513, as well as the secularized former abbey of Krevese. Thus, two lines emerged – the Bismarcks of Crevese and those of Schönhausen. Both lines split into two branches during the early 18th century, with two new manor houses built at Schönhausen. The Crevese branch was further divided into Crevese-Briest and Döbbelin, with the Briest line being the familie's most senior by primogeniture. The manor of Briest had been newly built in 1624, that of Döbbelin in 1736. The estate of Krevese was sold in 1819, and the estate of Schönhausen II in 1830. Notable members of the Crevese-Briest branch of the family were Levin Friedrich von Bismarck (1703–1774) and his son August Wilhelm von Bismarck (1750–1783), both Prussian ministers (of Justice and Finances) under Frederick the Great. Georg von Bismarck, a German general during World War II, also belonged to that branch.

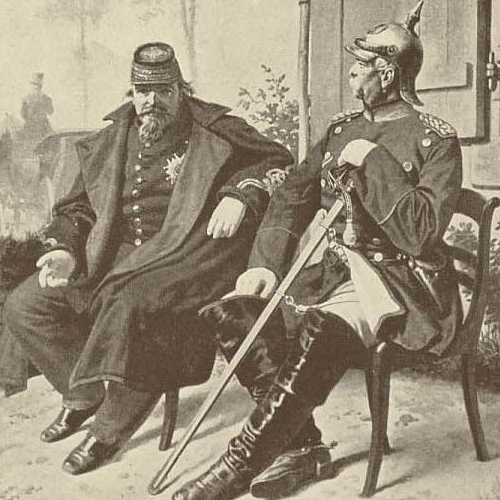
Otto von Bismarck (to the right) with the defeated Napoleon III of France

In 1815, the Prussian Junker family's most notable member, Otto von Bismarck, was born in the manor of Schönhausen I. As Prime Minister of Prussia since 1862, he gained the comital title (Graf) of Bismarck-Schönhausen in 1865 and the hereditary princely status of a Fürst von Bismarck after the Franco-Prussian War in 1871, followed by the Proclamation of the German Empire on 18 January 1871. He served as Germany's first chancellor until 1890. In 1871, he was granted the Sachsenwald forest near Hamburg for his achievements, namely for the Unification of Germany. He took up his residence at Friedrichsruh Castle in the Sachsenwald. Today, the forest area amounts to about 6,000 hectares, of which about a half is still owned by the House of Bismarck. The manor house at Friedrichsruh was destroyed in an RAF raid in 1945 and was rebuilt after World War II. Prince Otto's other estates, his birth manor Schönhausen I, the manor of Schönhausen II, which he had received as a grant from the German nation in 1885, as well as the estate of Varzin, Pomerania (now Warcino, Poland), were expropriated in 1945 as a result of border changes promulgated at the Potsdam Conference in 1945 and the subsequent expulsion of the Germans from German provinces annexed by Poland.

A number of other branches of the family also lost their ancestral possessions in this way, among them the branches of Briest and Döbbelin, as well as the Counts von Bismarck-Bohlen at Karlsburg, who had been raised to the rank of counts in 1818. The estates of Briest and Döbbelin have both been bought back by two respective family branches after the German reunification of 1990.

Otto's elder son Herbert, Prince von Bismarck, served his father as Secretary for Foreign Affairs between 1886 and 1890, while the younger son, Count Wilhelm von Bismarck-Schönhausen, was a member of the Reichstag and president of the Regency of the Province of Hanover. Both resigned their posts after their father was dismissed as Chancellor of Germany in 1890. Wilhelm subsequently accepted an appointment as Governor of East Prussia in 1894. Herbert's elder son Otto Christian Archibald, Prince von Bismarck (1897–1975), became a diplomat and later a member of the Bundestag, while the younger son, Gottfried (1901–1949), was a member of the Reichstag. The present prince, Carl-Eduard von Bismarck, is also a former member of the Bundestag.

Two ships of the German Imperial Navy (Kaiserliche Marine), as well as a battleship from the World War II era, were named after Otto von Bismarck. Also named in his honour were the Bismarck Sea and Bismarck Archipelago (both near the former German colony of New Guinea), as well as several places in the United States, among them Bismarck, North Dakota, the state's capital.

== Schönhausen line ==
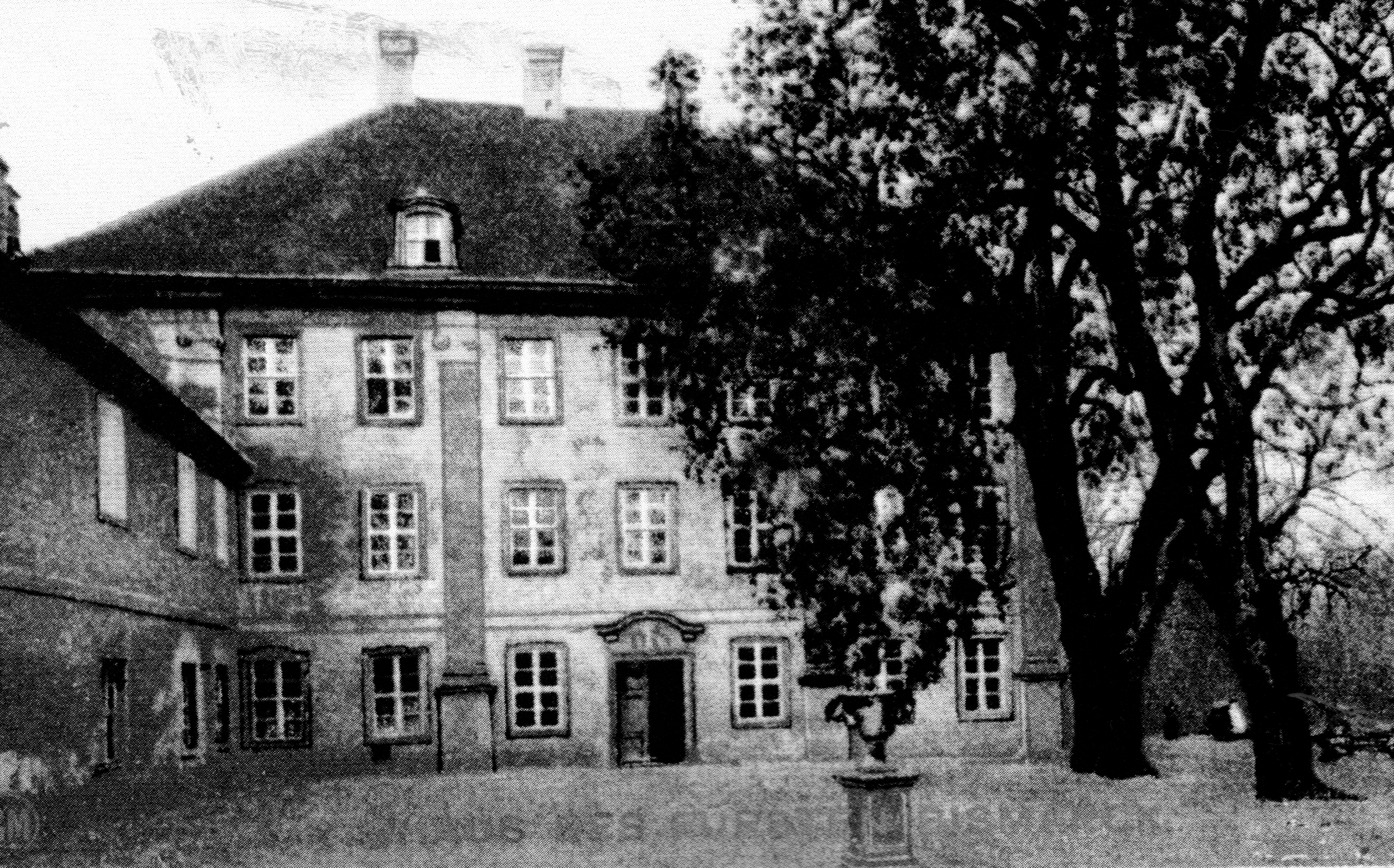
Schönhausen Manor I (demolished in 1958)

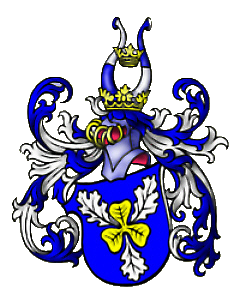
Original coat of arms of the Bismarck family

Coat of arms of Otto von Bismarck.

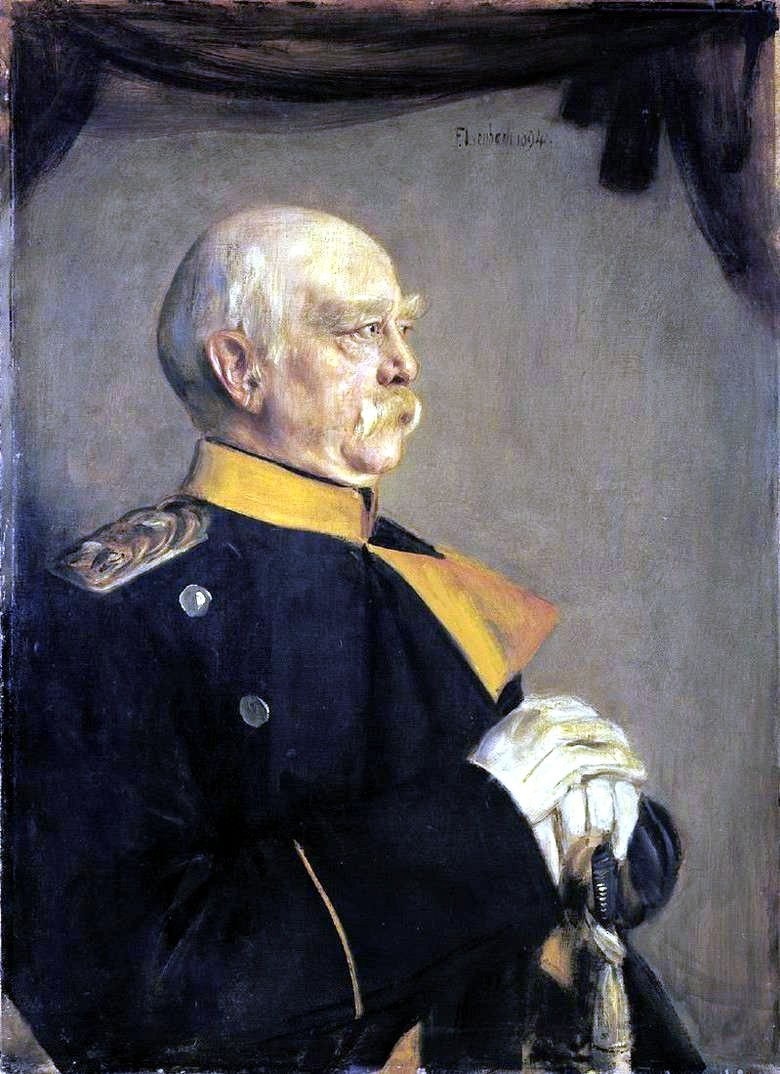
Fürst Otto von Bismarck, painted by Franz von Lenbach, 1894

- Jkr. Karl Alexander von Bismarck (1727–1797) ∞ Christiane Charlotte Gottliebe von Schönfeldt auf Werben (1741-1772)
  - Jkr. Ernst Friedrich Alexander von Bismarck (1763–1820) ∞ Luise Henriette Dorothea von Miltitz (1771-1805)
    - Jkr. Theodor von Bismarck (1790–1873), ∞ Karoline Countess von Bohlen (1798-1858), progenitor of the comital Bismarck-Bohlen branch
      - [...]
  - Jkr. Friedrich Adolf Ludwig von Bismarck (1766–1830), Prussian General Lieutenant
  - Jkr. Karl Wilhelm Ferdinand von Bismarck (1771–1845), landowner at Schönhausen, ∞ Luise Wilhelmine Mencken
    - Jkr. Bernhard von Bismarck (1810–1893), Prussian chamberlain (Kammerherr), member of the Prussian Landtag, ∞ 1) Adelheid Fanninger (1824-1844) ∞ 2) Malwine von Lettow-Vorbeck (1827-1904)
      - Jkr. Philipp Georg von Bismarck (1844–1894) ∞ 1) Elisabeth von der Osten (1849-1874) ∞ 2) Hedwig von Harnier (1858-1945)
        - Jkr. Gottfried von Bismarck (1881–1928) ∞ Gertrud Koehn (1890–1971)
          - Jkr. Klaus von Bismarck (1912–1997), Director General of the Westdeutscher Rundfunk (West German Broadcasting) ∞ Ruth-Alice von Wedemeyer (1920-2013)
          - Jkr. Philipp Wolfram von Bismarck (1913-2006), former member of the Bundestag ∞ Ebba Wendelstedt
            - [...]
          - Jkvr. Leanne Mathilde von Bismarck (1919-1962) ∞ Gottfried von Einem
            - Caspar von Einem, Minister of the Interior of Austria
          - Jkr. Gottfried von Bismarck (1921-2001) ∞ Countess Ehrengard Bertha Minetta Schwerin von Krosigk (1922-2012)
            - [...]
      - Jkvr. Metta Maria von Bismarck (1864-1927) ∞ 1) Georg Berend Friedrich von Ramin ∞ 2) Claus von Loos
      - Jkr. Otto von Bismarck (1866-1935) ∞ Frieda Schultze (1873-1940)
        - Jkr. Bernhard von Bismarck (1908-1950) ∞ Countess Edith von Bernstorff (1915-1977)
      - Jkr. Herbert Rudolf von Bismarck (1884–1955), Member of the Prussian House of Representatives and the Reichstag ∞ Maria von Kleist-Retzow (1893-1979)
        - [...]
    - HSH Otto, Prince von Bismarck, Duke of Lauenburg (1815–1898), First Chancellor of Germany, Fürst von Bismarck from 1871; heir of Schönhausen I, acquired Varzin and the Sachsenwald forest with Friedrichsruh; ∞ Johanna von Puttkamer (1824-1894)
      - Countess Marie von Bismarck-Schönhausen (1847–1926) ∞ Cuno, Count zu Rantzau (1843-1917)
      - HSH Herbert, Prince von Bismarck (1849–1904), Secretary for Foreign Affairs; ∞ Marguerite, Countess Hoyos von und zu Stichsenstein
        - Countess Hannah Leopoldine Alice (1893–1971) ∞ Leopold von Bredow (1875-1933)
        - Countess Maria Goedela (1896–1981) ∞ Count Hermann von Keyserling (1880–1946)
          - Count Manfred von Keyserling (1920–2008) ∞ Countess Brigitta Margaretha Dorothea Calice (b. 1924)
          - Count Arnold von Keyserling (1922–2005), renowned philosopher ∞ Princess Wilhelmine Maria Sieglinde von Auersperg (b. 1921)
        - HSH Otto Christian Archibald, Prince von Bismarck (1897–1975), diplomat, member of the Bundestag; ∞ Ann-Mari Tengbom
          - HSH Ferdinand, Prince von Bismarck (1930-2019) ∞ Countess Elisabeth Lippens (1939-2023)
            - HSH Carl-Eduard, Prince von Bismarck (born 1961), former member of the Bundestag, ∞ 1) Laura Harring, div., ∞ 2) Celia Demaurex, div., ∞ 3) Nathalie Bariman, div. ∞ 4) Alessandra Silvestri-Levy
              - Count Alexei von Bismarck-Schönhausen (b. 2006)
              - Countess Grace (b. 2008)
            - Count Gottfried von Bismarck-Schönhausen (1962–2007)
            - Count Gregor von Bismarck-Schönhausen (born 1964) ∞ Samantha Della Schiava
              - (by Diane Shulman (b. 1957)) Marina Alexandra Shulman von Bismarck (born 1986) ∞ Michael Swindle (b. 1987)
              - Count Léon (born 2002)
              - Count Otis (born 2007)
              - Countess Wilhelmina (born 2009)
            - Countess Vanessa (born 1971) ∞ Maximilian Weiner
          - Count Alexander von Bismarck-Schönhausen (1935–1992) ∞ Princess Alexandra von Croÿ (b. 1941), div., ∞ Ulrike Prange (*1961)
            - Countess Claudia Anna Katharine Mona (born 1964) ∞ Frank Weyerhaeuser Piasecki (*1965)
          - Count Maximilian von Bismarck-Schönhausen (born 1947) ∞ Barbara Meijer (*1958)
            - Count Konstantin von Bismarck-Schönhausen (born 1987)
            - Count Victor Alexander von Bismarck-Schönhausen (born 1989)
          - Countess Gunilla (born 1949) ∞ Luis Ortiz y Moreno (*1944), div.
          - Count Leopold von Bismarck-Schönhausen (born 1951), m. Debonnaire Patterson
            - Count Nikolai von Bismarck (born 1986)
        - Count Gottfried von Bismarck-Schönhausen (1901–1949), member of the Reichstag; ∞ Melanie, Countess von Hoyos von und zu Stichsenstein
          - Countess Vendeline (1937-1968) ∞ Count Christoph von Ledebur-Wicheln (b. 1933)
          - Countess Barbara (1939-1986) ∞ Stephen Brooks (1914-1986)
          - Count Andreas von Bismarck-Schönhausen (1941-2013) ∞ Countess Olivia Larisch von Moennich (b. 1943), div. ∞ Charlotte Kinberg (b. 1951)
            - Countess Christine von Bismarck-Schönhausen (born 1965) ∞ Guy du Boulay Villax
            - Countess Stephanie von Bismarck-Schönhausen (born 1976) ∞ Baron Karl-Theodor zu Guttenberg (born 1971), former Federal Minister for Economics and Defence
        - Count Albrecht von Bismarck-Schönhausen (1903–1970) ∞ Mona Strader (1897–1983)
      - Count Wilhelm von Bismarck-Schönhausen (1852–1901), member of the Reichstag and president of the Regency of the Province of Hanover, Governor of East Prussia ∞ Sybilla Malwine von Arnim-Kröchlendorff (1864-1945)
        - Countess Herta (b. 1886) ∞ Walter Glawe (1880-1967), div. ∞ Heinrich Kuhler (1878-1945)
        - Countess Irene (1888-1982), ∞ 1) Herbert Count von Einsiedel (1885-1945); ∞ 2) Horst von Petersdorff (1892-1962)
        - Countess Dorothee (1892-1975), ∞ 1) Reinhold Count von Rehbinder (1888-1962); ∞ 2) Wilhelm Friedrich von Löwenfeld (1879-1946)
        - Count Nikolaus von Bismarck-Schönhausen (1896-1940) ∞ 1) Brigitte von Eickstedt-Peterswaldt (1897-1980); ∞ 2) Elisabeth Countess von Faber-Castell (1899-1986)
          - Count Rule von Bismarck-Schönhausen (b. 1920) ∞ Olga Hunieus y Cox (1917-2002)
          - Countess Beatrix (1921-2006) ∞ 1) Christian Heinrich Prince of Sayn-Wittgenstein-Hohenstein, div. ∞ 2) Kai von Mengersen (1928-1975)
    - Jkvr. Malwine von Bismarck (1827–1908) ∞ Oskar von Arnim-Kröchlendorff (1813-1903)

== Gallery ==
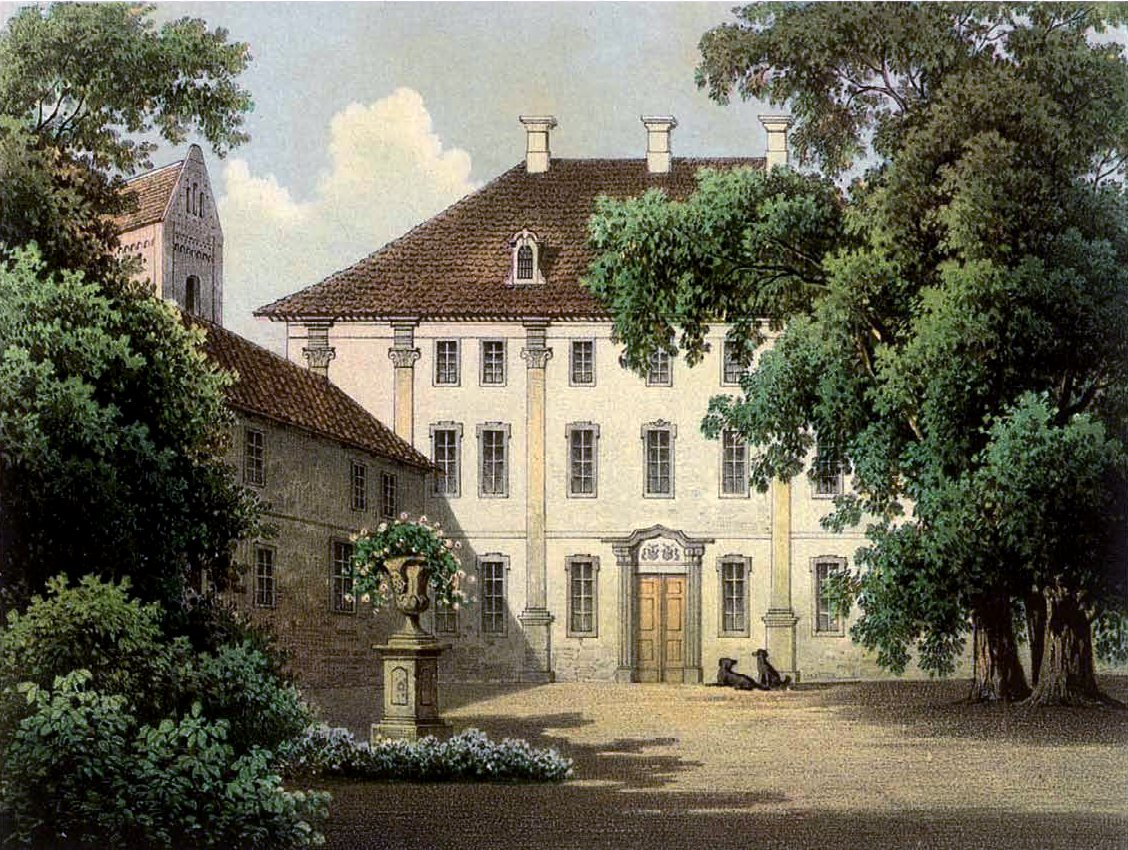
Schönhausen I, Altmark, birth place and parental home of Otto von Bismarck

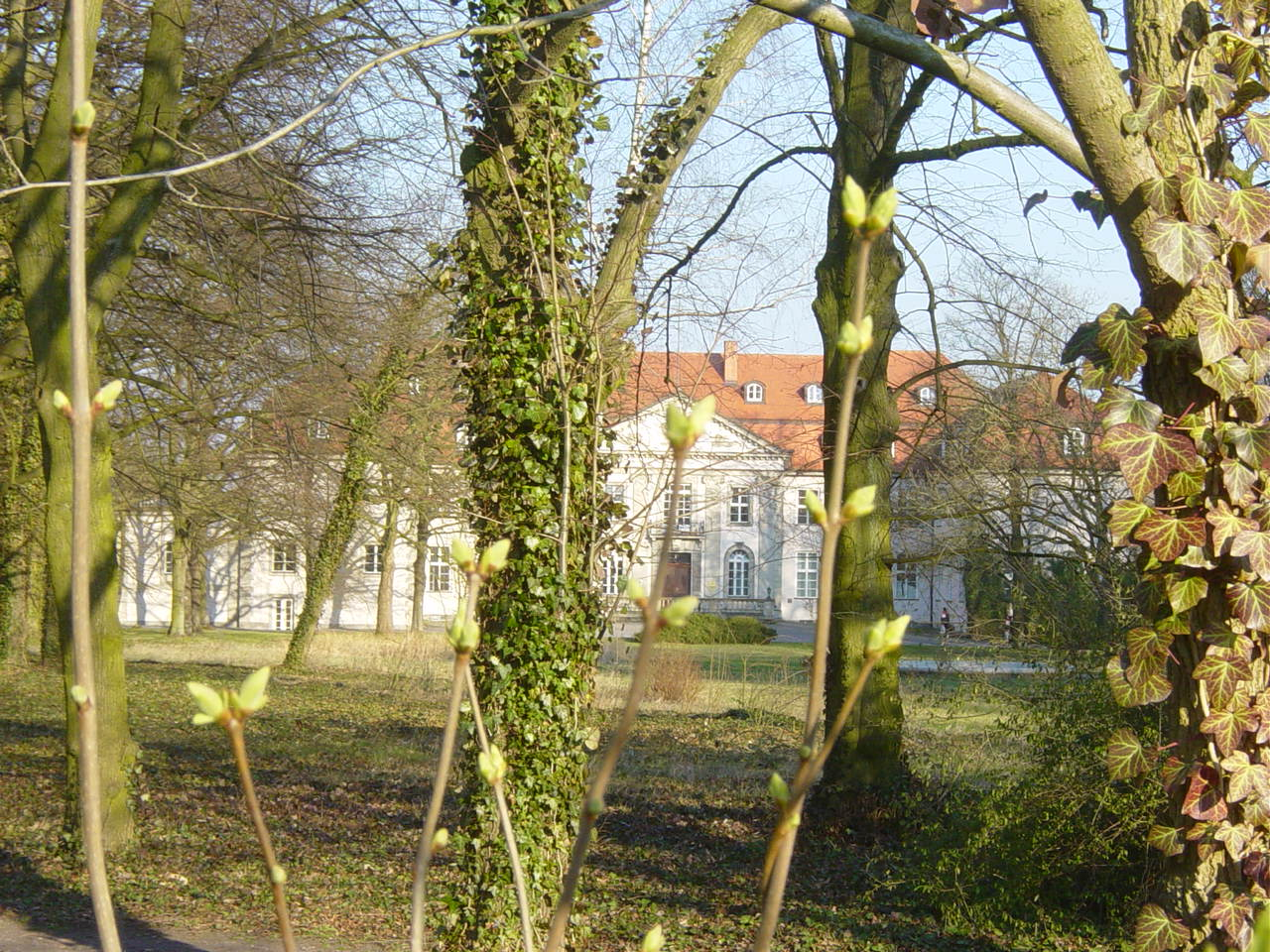
Schönhausen II

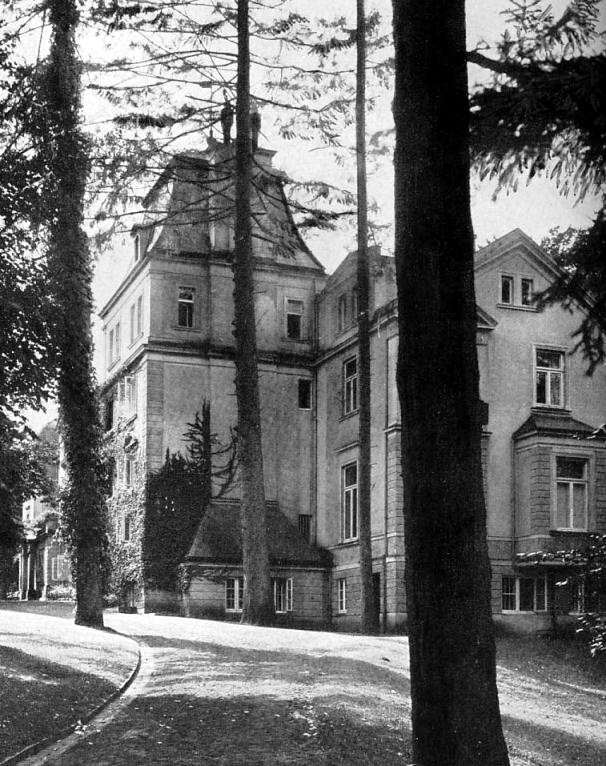
Friedrichsruh, The Old Castle (destroyed in 1945), death place of Otto von Bismarck

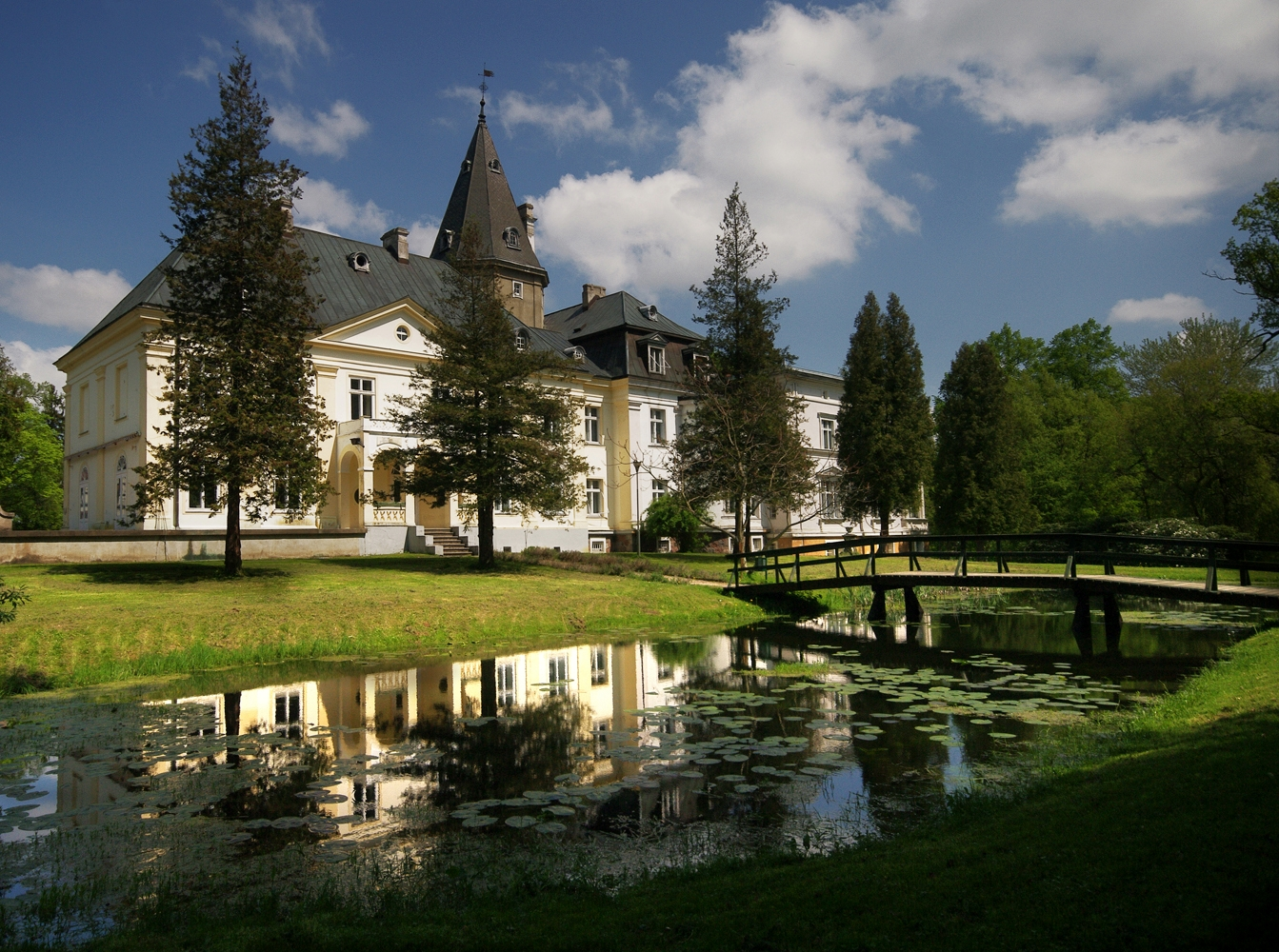
Varzin, Farther Pomerania, estate of Otto von Bismarck

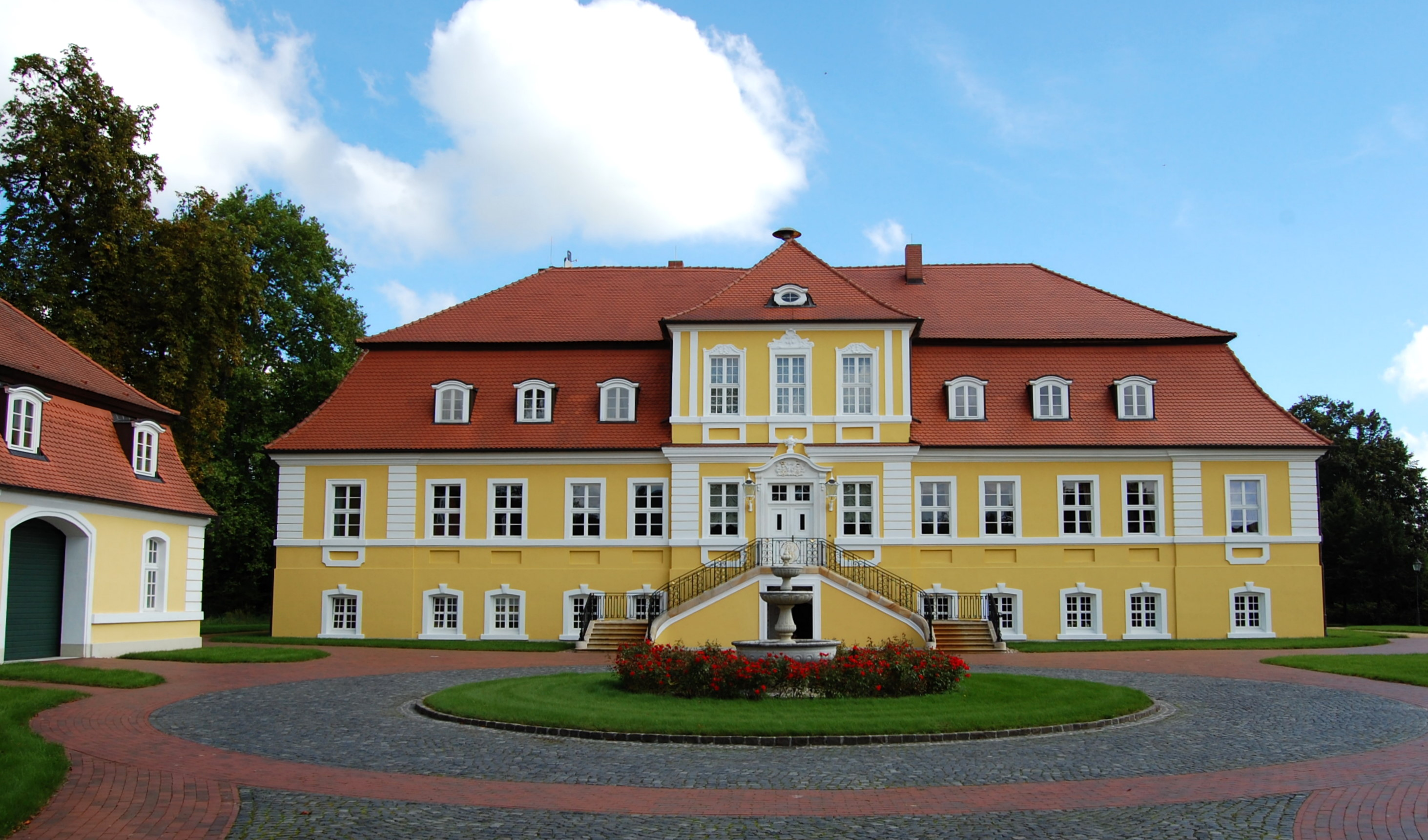
Döbbelin, Altmark (owned by the family since 1344)

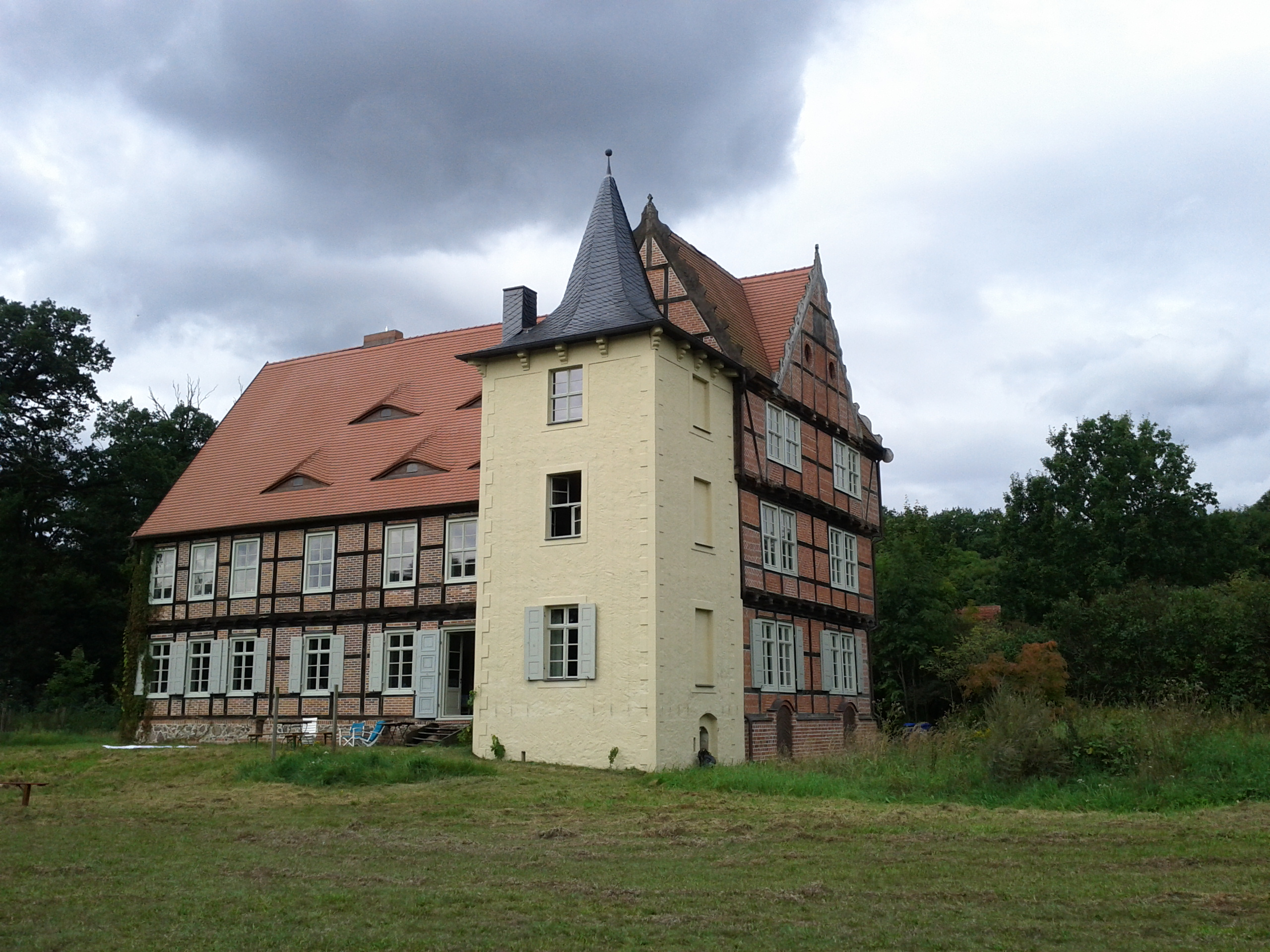
Briest, Altmark (owned by the family since 1345)
