= Nikolai von Bismarck =

British photographer

- Full name: Nikolai Leopold Archibald Graf von Bismarck-Schönhausen
- Born: 29 December 1986 (age 39)
- Noble family: Bismarck
- Father: Count Leopold von Bismarck-Schönhausen
- Mother: Debonnaire Jane Patterson
- Occupation: Photographer

Count Nikolai Leopold Archibald von Bismarck-Schönhausen (German: Nikolai Leopold Archibald Graf von Bismarck-Schönhausen; born 29 December 1986) is a British photographer.

== Early life and family ==
Count Nikolai von Bismarck-Schönhausen was raised in Central London. He is a member of the House of Bismarck, a German noble family headed by his cousin, Carl, Prince of Bismarck. He is the eldest of four children. His father is Count Leopold von Bismarck-Schönhausen. Leopold's parents were Otto Christian Archibald, Prince of Bismarck, and Ann-Mari Tengbom, the daughter of Ivar Tengbom. Nikolai's mother is Debonnaire Jane Patterson, the granddaughter of John Roseberry Monson, 10th Baron Monson, and the niece of John Monson, 11th Baron Monson. He is a great-great-grandson of German Chancellor Otto, Prince of Bismarck.

Von Bismarck attended the German School, London followed by Harrow School, an all-boys boarding school in Harrow, London.

His relationship with model Kate Moss was much covered by the tabloids.

== Career ==
Von Bismarck works as a photographer. When he was sixteen years old he trained with photographer Mario Testino. Working under Testino led to his first professional photoshoot, titled "Like a Virgin" and was commissioned by Isabella Blow, at which time he was the youngest photographer to shoot for Condé Nast. He studied photography at Parsons Paris School of Art and Design in Paris, France.

After graduating from Parsons, he worked with Annie Leibovitz for two years. In 2013, he produced a photography exhibit focused on Ethiopia. Most recently he has completed two books of portraits, 'The Dior Sessions' published by Rizzoli in 2019 and The Fendi Set published by Rizzoli in 2022.

Von Bismarck's portraits have appeared in numerous publications, including the Financial Times, The Telegraph, Vogue, and the covers of W magazine, Harper's Bazaar, Purple and Vogue. His reportage work has been featured in several publications including the Daily Mirror and The Times.
