= Debonnaire von Bismarck =

English socialite (born 1959)

- Full name: Debonnaire Jane Gräfin von Bismarck-Schönhausen
- Born: Debonnaire Jane Patterson; 19 August 1959 (age 66)
- Noble family: Bismarck (by marriage)
- Spouse: Count Leopold von Bismarck-Schönhausen (m. 1984)
- Issue: Count Nikolai von Bismarck-Schönhausen; Count Tassilo von Bismarck-Schönhausen; Count Caspar von Bismarck-Schönhausen; Carl von Bismarck-Schönhausen
- Father: William Garry Patterson
- Mother: Sandra Debonnaire Monson
- Occupation: businesswoman, socialite

Countess Debonnaire Jane von Bismarck-Schönhausen (German: Debonnaire Jane Gräfin von Bismarck-Schönhausen; née Patterson; born 19 August 1959) is an English businesswoman, stylist, and socialite.

== Personal life ==
Bismarck was born Debonnaire Jane Patterson on 19 August 1959 as the first child of Major William Garry Patterson, a military officer, and The Honourable Sandra Debonnaire Monson, a daughter of John Roseberry Monson, 10th Baron Monson. Her maternal uncle was John Monson, 11th Baron Monson.

In 1977 Bismarck was featured on the cover of, and profiled in, The Daily Telegraph's Sunday Magazine, which covered her debut into society.

In 1984 she married a German nobleman, Count Leopold von Bismarck-Schönhausen (b. 1951), the youngest son of Otto Christian Archibald, Prince of Bismarck and his wife, Ann-Mari Tengbom. They have four sons: Nikolai, Tassilo, Caspar, and Carl. Nikolai has been in a long-term relationship with Kate Moss.

== Career ==
Bismarck founded the company Debonnaire, which she runs out of a boutique in Knightsbridge, London. Her company sells vintage and internationally collected women's clothing and accessories. In 2014, after a trip to India, she began producing cotton shirts and boxer shorts, and later opened a Debonnaire showroom.
