= Wilhelm von Bismarck =

German counselor, civil servant and politician

Wilhelm
- Count of Bismarck-Schönhausen
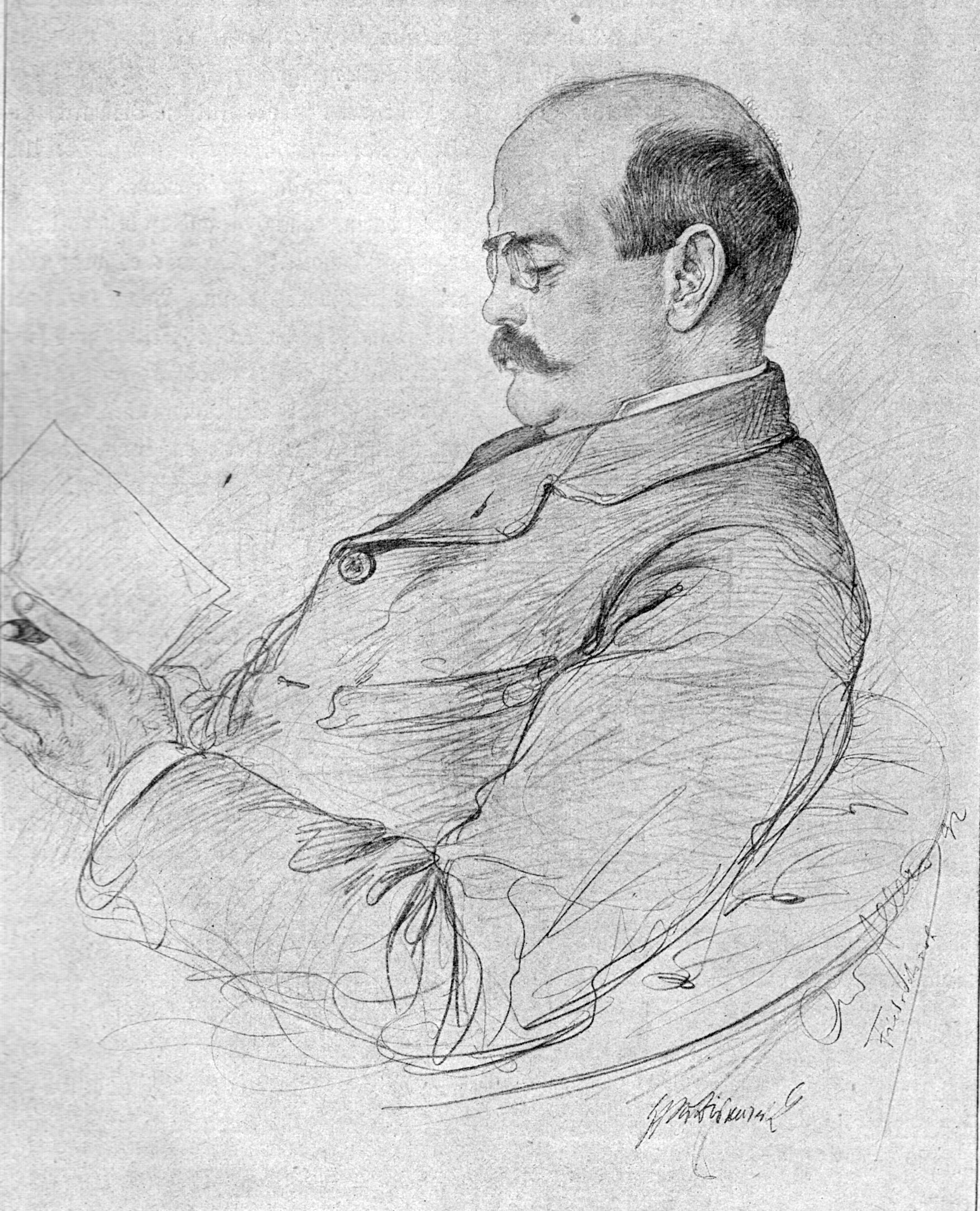
- Born: Wilhelm Otto Albrecht von Bismarck-Schönhausen; 1 August 1852; Frankfort-on-the-Main, Kingdom of Prussia
- Died: 30 May 1901 (aged 48); Varzin, German Empire
- Noble family: House of Bismarck
- Spouse: Sybilla Malwine von Arnim-Kröchlendorff
- Issue: 4 (Three daughters and one son)
- Father: Otto von Bismarck
- Mother: Johanna von Puttkamer

Count Wilhelm Otto Albrecht von Bismarck-Schönhausen (1 August 1852 – 30 May 1901) was a German counselor, civil servant and politician, who served as a member of the Reichstag from 1880 to 1881 and president of the Regency of Hanover from 1889 to 1890. The youngest son of Otto von Bismarck, he and his brother Herbert von Bismarck both resigned their posts after the elder Bismarck was dismissed as Chancellor of Germany in 1890. Wilhelm subsequently accepted an appointment as Oberpräsident (governor) of East Prussia in 1894. Mount Wilhelm (German: Wilhelmsberg, or in Kuman: Enduwa Kombuglu, or Kombugl'o Dimbin) the highest mountain in Papua New Guinea at 4,509 metres (14,793 ft), part of the Bismarck Range, was named after him by Hugo Zöller.

== Biography ==
Wilhelm von Bismarck was born at Frankfurt am Main, the youngest of three children born to Otto von Bismarck and his wife Johanna, née von Puttkamer. He had an older sister, Marie (b. 1847), and brother, Herbert (b. 1849), the latter serving as Foreign Secretary from 1886 to 1890.

Though Herbert was considered next in line as Prince of Bismarck, and head of the princely House of Bismarck, Wilhelm von Bismarck was considered "the more popular of the two brothers". He was a noted athlete and sportsman in college and, like his father, participated in dueling. On at least one of these occasions, he nearly lost his life and initially was not expected to live more than a month. Wilhelm's likeness to his father was considered "remarkable", having "the same haughty demeanor, the same shape of head, and even the same gestures".

Both he and his brother fought in the Franco-Prussian War, each holding a lieutenant's commission, as staff officers with the 1st Dragoon Regiment, and received the Iron Cross for gallantry. In 1879, Bismarck was made secretary to General Edwin Freiherr von Manteuffel, military governor of the then recently ceded provinces of Alsace-Lorraine.

Bismarck briefly joined his brother and father in German politics, becoming a member of the Reichstag, but was defeated upon seeking re-election in 1881. He then pursued a career in law and, the next year, became a government counselor. In 1885, he married his cousin, Sybil von Arnim, with whom he had four children.

Four years later, in 1889, he became President of the Regency of Hanover and held this position until the following year, when he and Herbert left their respective appointments in protest of their father being forced to step down as Chancellor by Kaiser Wilhelm II. In 1894, he was unexpectedly appointed Oberpräsident (governor) of East Prussia.

On the morning of May 31, 1901, after an illness of six days, Bismarck died in Berlin from peritonitis. The funeral took place a week later, the same day Wilhelm II planned to unveil a statue to Otto von Bismarck in front of the Reichstag building. At the time, given the somewhat tense relationship between Wilhelm and the Bismarck family, there was some speculation whether they would attend. The Kaiser's refusal to postpone the ceremony, given the preparations had already been completed and an expected attendance of thousands from Germany and elsewhere in Europe, made their attendance an impossibility.

Of the newspapers which carried obituaries of Wilhelm's death, according to the New York Times, "few of them are complimentary, and the majority point out that the son possessed all of his father's foibles without his father's greatness."

== Personal life ==
He was married to his first cousin, Sybilla Malwine von Arnim-Kröchlendorff (1864-1945), younger daughter of Oskar von Arnim (1813-1903) and his wife, Malwine von Bismarck (1827-1907), who was also Wilhelm's paternal aunt. They had:

- Countess Herta (b. 1886-1954)
- Countess Irene (1888-1982), m. 1) Herbert Count von Einsiedel; 2) Horst von Petersdorff
- Countess Dorothee (1892-1975), m. 1) Reinhold Count von Rehbinder; 2) Wilhelm Friedrich von Löwenfeld
- Count Nikolaus von Bismarck-Schönhausen (1896-1940), m. 1) Brigitte von Eickstedt-Peterswaldt; 2) Elisabeth Countess von Faber-Castell
  - Count Rule von Bismarck-Schönhausen (b. 1920), m. Olga Huneeus Cox
  - Countess Beatrix (1921-2006), m. Christian Heinrich Prince of Sayn-Wittgenstein-Hohenstein

== Orders and decorations ==
He received the following orders and decorations:

- Kingdom of Prussia:
  - Iron Cross (1870), 2nd Class on Black Band
  - Knight of the Red Eagle, 2nd Class with Star and Oak Leaves
- (Austrian Empire) (Kingdom of Hungary) Austria-Hungary:
  - Knight of the Iron Crown, 3rd Class, 1879
  - Commander of the Order of Franz Joseph, with Star, 1884
- Kingdom of Italy: Grand Officer of the Crown of Italy
- Netherlands: Commander of the Netherlands Lion, with Star
- Ottoman Empire:
  - Order of Osmanieh, 2nd Class
  - Order of the Medjidie, 1st Class
- Persian Empire: Order of the Lion and the Sun, 3rd Class
- Kingdom of Portugal: Commander of the Royal Military Order of Our Lord Jesus Christ
- Russian Empire: Knight of St. Anna, 2nd Class in Diamonds
- Spain: Commander of the Order of Charles III, 1st Class

== See also ==
- House of Bismarck
