= Alessandra Silvestri-Levy =

Brazilian writer and art curator

Alessandra
- Princess of Bismarck
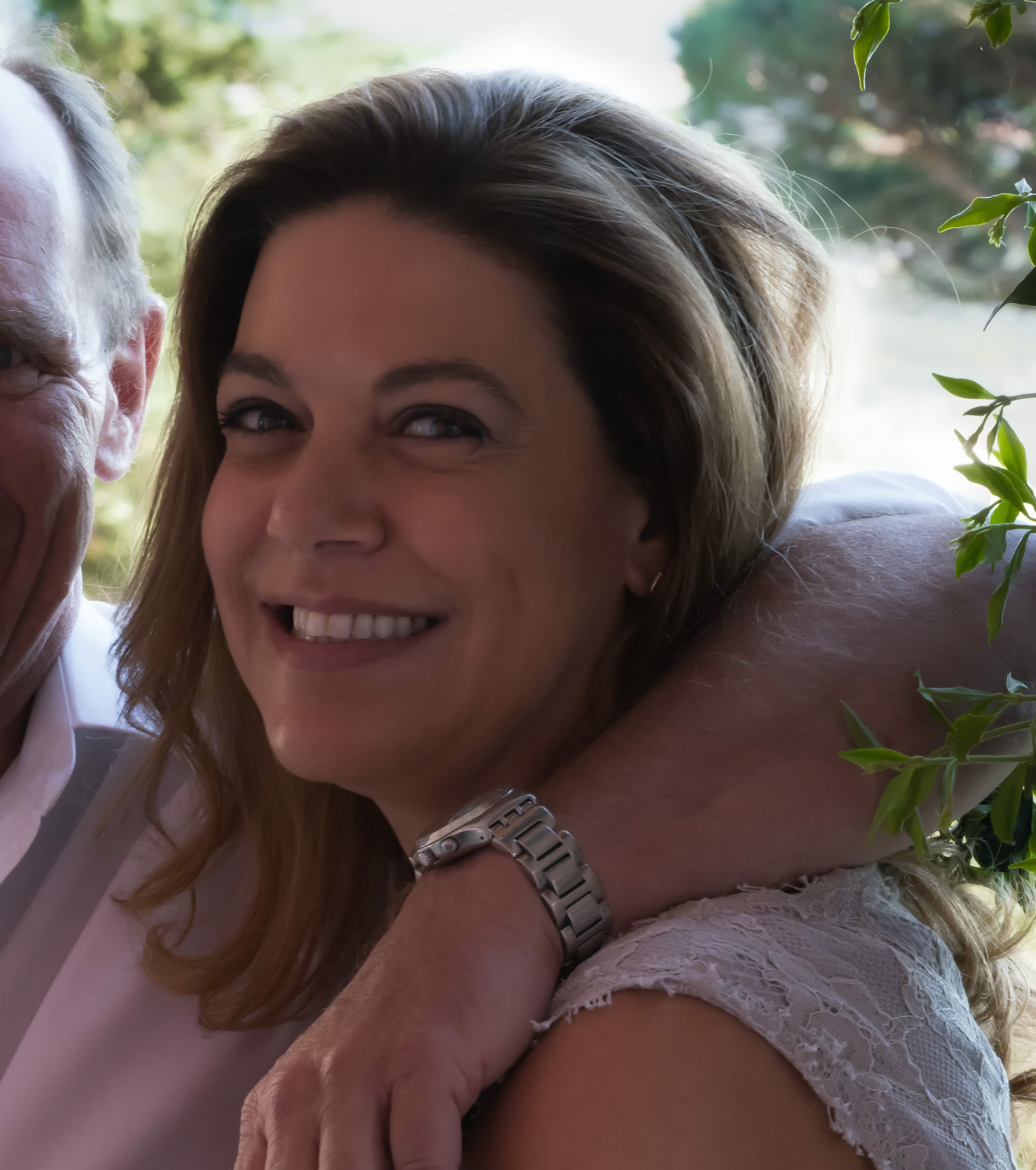
- Alessandra in 2017
- Born: Alessandra Silvestri; 1 November 1972 (age 53); São Paulo, Brazil
- Noble family: Bismarck (by marriage)
- Spouses: Jean Lévy (m. 1998–2014) Carl-Eduard, Prince of Bismarck (m. 2016)
- Occupation: Art writer and curator

Alessandra, Princess of Bismarck (née Silvestri, later Silvestri-Lévy, born 1 November 1972) is an Italo-Brazilian art writer and curator. As the wife of Carl-Eduard von Bismarck, she became the Princess of Bismarck in 2019.

A patron of the arts, she has produced and curated several exhibitions of photography, contemporary art, literature, and film festivals, mainly in Paris, São Paulo, and Havana.

She was the International Executive Director for the Brazilian Cinema Foundation (Cinemateca Brasileira).

== Biography ==
She was married between 1998 and 2014 to French diplomat Jean Levy, with whom she had two children. The godmother to the wedding was Danielle Mitterrand, widow of former French President François Mitterrand, a friend of the couple.

Lévy served as Consul General of France in São Paulo between 1998 and 2000. He then served as French ambassador in Havana, Cuba, between 2000 and 2004, where Silvestri-Lévy co-produced the publication of the photographic collection of Alberto Korda, the Cuban photographer known for the Guerrillero Heroico photo. The collection was presented in the work Cuba por Korda, published in 2002, accompanied by texts by Silvestri-Levy and journalist Christophe Lovigny. The work was published in Brazil in 2004, being praised for the "well cared for edition" of Silvestri-Levy and Lovigny by the magazine Primeira Leitura, and the "beautiful Brazilian edition" of those authors, demonstrating the close relationship between photography and the Cuban Revolution, by the writer, and professor from Ceará, Edmilson Caminha.

She married Prince Carl-Eduard von Bismarck, a businessman, former member of the German Parliament, great-great-grandson of Chancellor Otto von Bismarck, and head of the von Bismarck-Schönhausen noble house, in Cascais,Portugal, in 2016.

== Publications ==
- 2002: Cuba por Korda (with Christophe Lovigny). - Cosac Naify-Brasil, Ocean Press-USA, Calmann-Levy-France (ISBN 2702133339), Kuntersman-Germany, Ediciones Aurelia, Spain.
- 2002: Les Années Révolutionnaires - Éditions de l´Aube France (ISBN 2-87678-816-0).
- 2007: Cuba Sempre - Caros Amigos.
- 2007: Che Guevara Combatente e Intelectual - Casa Amarela.
