= Celia von Bismarck =

Swiss humanitarian

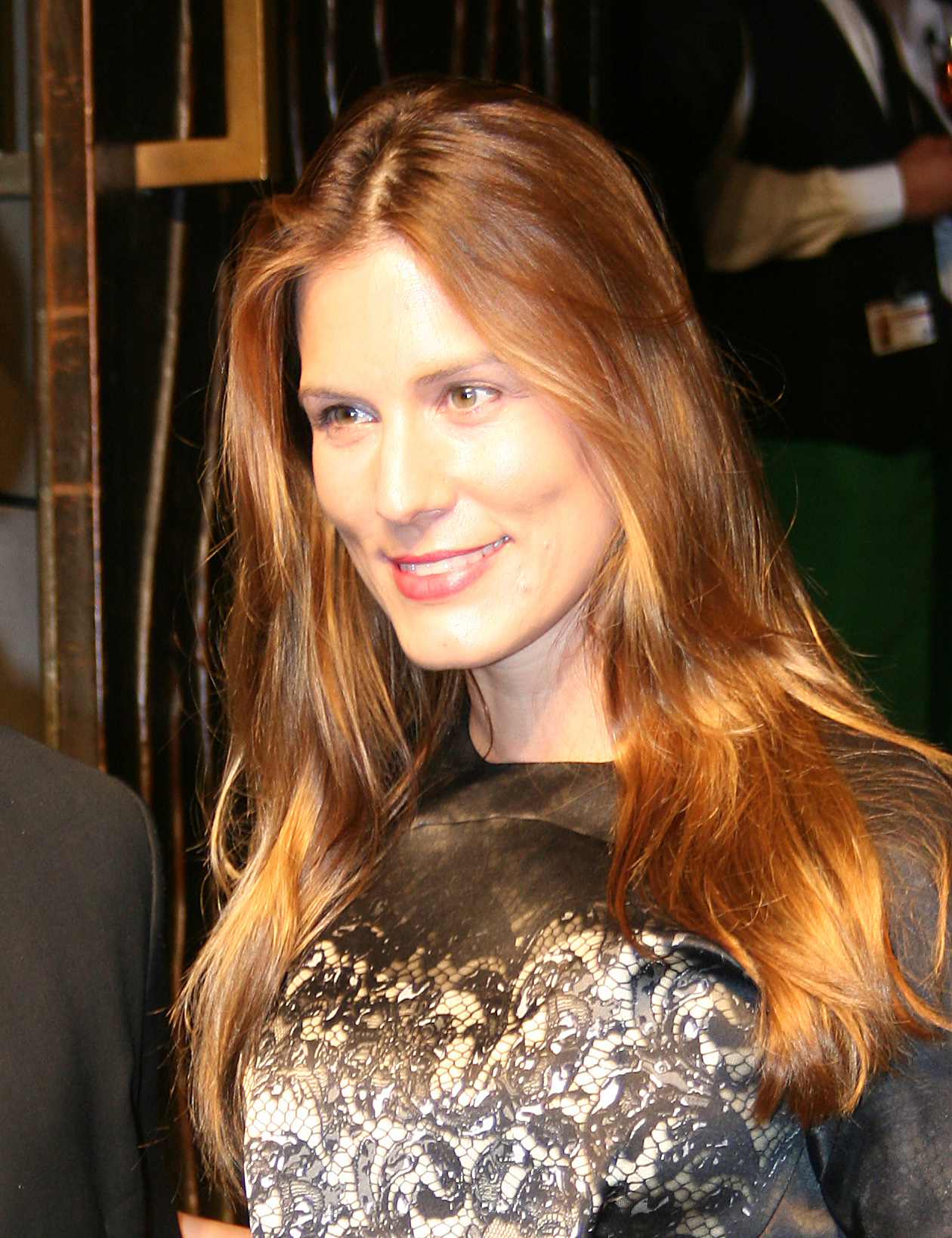
- Von Bismarck in 2008

Ambassador of the Swiss Red Cross
- In office 2006–2010
- President: René Rhinow

Personal details
- Born: Celia Demaurex; 19 October 1971 Geneva, Switzerland
- Died: 17 December 2010 (aged 39) Geneva, Switzerland
- Resting place: Cimetière de Chêne-Bougeries
- Spouse: Carl von Bismarck (m. 1997; div. 2004)
- Parent(s): Michel Demaurex; Rosemarie Grethe
- Occupation: philanthropist, socialite, editor

Countess Celia von Bismarck-Schönhausen (née Demaurex; 19 October 1971 – 17 December 2010) was a Swiss humanitarian, socialite, magazine editor, and philanthropist. She worked for the Aga Khan Development Network, the Cinema for Peace Foundation, and served as an Ambassador for the Swiss Red Cross.

== Early life ==
Von Bismarck was born Celia Demaurex on 19 October 1971 in Geneva to Michel Demaurex (1926–2014), a real estate investor, and Rosemarie Grethe, a jewelry designer. She attended schools in Boston, Paris, and Berlin.

== Career ==
Von Bismarck worked as a consultant for cultural and social foundations. In Berlin, she worked for the non-profit organization Dropping Knowledge. From 2003 to 2005, she was employed at the Geneva Centre for Security Policy, taking part in conferences in Kosovo and Serbia.

In August 2005, von Bismarck was appointed as the head of protocol at Filmfest Hamburg. She was also an activist for Cinema for Peace Foundation.

She served as an ambassador for the Swiss Red Cross from 2006 to 2010. During her time as a Red Cross ambassador, von Bismarck also worked as a freelance editor at Park Avenue and was employed by the Aga Khan Development Network.

In 2008, she sponsored the premier of Visa Swap Shop in Berlin Mitte.

Von Bismarck was a jury member for the Quadriga Award.

== Personal life ==
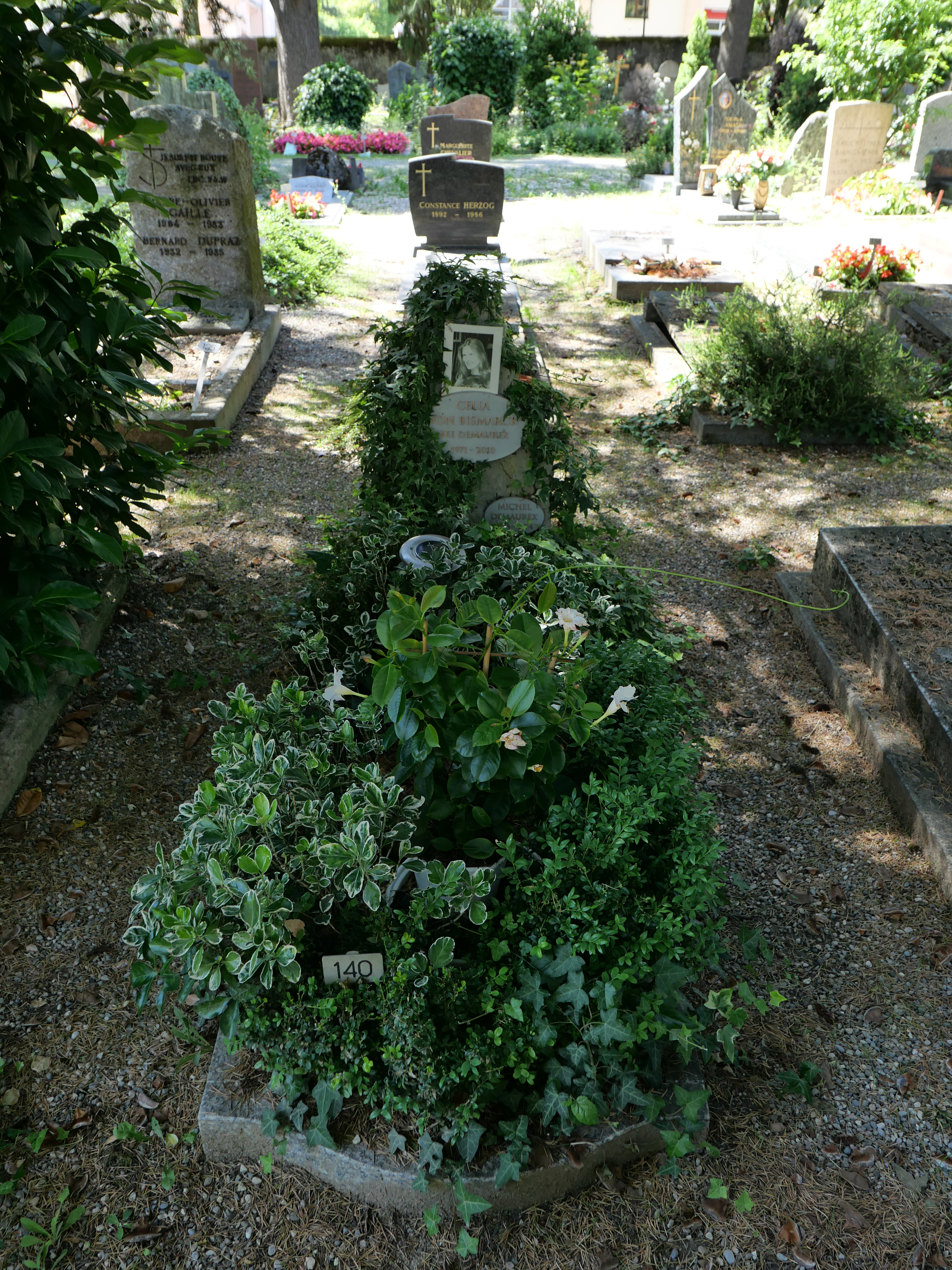
The grave in 2024.

In 1990, while attending the Monaco Grand Prix, she met Count Carl-Eduard von Bismarck-Schönhausen, the son and heir of Ferdinand, Prince of Bismarck. On 3 June 1997, she married Count Carl von Bismarck, in a civil ceremony in Geneva. Their religious wedding was held on 7 June 1997 at the Cathédrale Saint-Pierre de Genève. The couple resided at the Bismarck manor house in Friedrichsruh. She and her husband divorced in September 2004.

== Death ==
In October 2010, von Bismarck was diagnosed with melanoma. The cancer spread to her pancreas. She died on 17 December 2010 in Geneva and found her final resting place at the cemetery of Chêne-Bougeries. Her father was buried in the same grave.
