= Ferdinand von Bismarck =

German lawyer and landowner (1930–2019)

Ferdinand

Prince of Bismarck
- Tenure: 24 December 1975 – 23 July 2019
- Predecessor: Otto Christian Archibald von Bismarck
- Successor: Carl-Eduard von Bismarck
- Born: 22 November 1930; London, United Kingdom
- Died: 23 July 2019 (aged 88); Reinbek, Germany
- Spouse: Elisabeth Lippens
- Issue: Carl-Eduard von Bismarck; Gottfried von Bismarck; Gregor von Bismarck; Vanessa von Bismarck
Names
- Ferdinand Herbord Ivar Fürst von Bismarck
- House: Bismarck
- Father: Otto Christian Archibald von Bismarck
- Mother: Ann-Mari Tengbom

Ferdinand Herbord Ivar, Prince of Bismarck (German: Ferdinand Herbord Ivar Fürst von Bismarck; 22 November 1930 – 23 July 2019) was a German lawyer and landowner from the family of statesman Otto von Bismarck. He was the head of the princely branch of the House of Bismarck.

== Background and career ==
Styles of The Prince of Bismarck
- Reference style: His Serene Highness
- Spoken style: Your Serene Highness

Bismarck was born in London to German politician and diplomat Otto Christian Archibald von Bismarck and Swedish socialite Ann-Mari Tengbom. He was a grandson of statesman Herbert von Bismarck, a great-grandson of statesman Otto von Bismarck, and the maternal grandson of the prominent Swedish architect Ivar Tengbom.

Bismarck was raised in London and Rome, where his father worked as a diplomat. In November 1944, his father was released from the foreign service because of his contacts with an anti-Nazi resistance group. Bismarck was sent to Sweden and did not return to Germany until 1947, where he was then educated at Schule Schloss Salem boarding school. In the early 1950s, Bismarck worked at the German-Brazilian Chamber of Commerce. He went on to study law, earning a law degree in 1956. He worked for the European Commission in Brussels until 1967, after which he went on to work as an attorney in Hamburg. During that time he lived in his family home in Friedrichsruh, the estate granted to his grandfather by Emperor William I. Bismarck was a member of the board of the Otto von Bismarck Foundation and was patron of the Bismarckbund and the Bismarck Order, as well as chairman of the Duchy of Lauenburg Foundation.

Bismarck managed his family's estate, including the Sachsenwald, a 6,000 hectares (15,000 acres) forest near Hamburg. He sold parts of the forest for construction and purchased farmland in Uruguay, which he later sold. Bismarck also invested in Marbella, Spain, where he was a notable member of the Marbella Club. He founded the "Marbella Hill Club", a settlement of luxurious villas, and also acquired the "Park Palace", a huge tenement building in Monte Carlo. From 1989, he sold 2,250 hectares (5,600 acres) of the Sachsenwald to the shipowner Eberhart von Rantzau, owner of the Deutsche Afrika-Linien, retaining 4,500 hectares (11,000 acres). Bismarck died in a hospital in Reinbek at the age of 88.

== Personal life ==
Bismarck married the Belgian Elisabeth Lippens (1939−2023), daughter of Count Léon Lippens and granddaughter of the Belgian politician Maurice Lippens, Count Lippens, from 1960 until his death. They had four children:

- Carl-Eduard Carl-Eduard Otto Wolfgang Jayme Anders von Bismarck-Schönhausen, Prince of Bismarck (b. 1961)
- Count Gottfried Alexander Leopold von Bismarck-Schönhausen (1962–2007)
- Count Gregor Archibald Johannes von Bismarck-Schönhausen (b. 1964)
- Countess Vanessa von Bismarck-Schönhausen (b. 1971)

Bismarck had the nominal title of Count of Bismarck-Schönhausen from his birth until the death of his father in 1975, when he succeeded to the title of Prince. He was succeeded by his oldest son, Carl von Bismarck, in accordance with letters patent of 1871.

He was a godfather of King Willem-Alexander of the Netherlands, who also attended his funeral at Friedrichsruh. Ferdinand had been a college friend of Prince Claus at a young age, when they studied law together in Hamburg. Princess Beatrix, former Queen of the Netherlands, and Prince Claus also chose him as groomsman for their wedding in 1966. Among the visitors of Friedrichsruh were also the kings Carl XVI Gustaf of Sweden and Juan Carlos I of Spain with their wives, as well as the Duke and Duchess of Windsor.

== Publications ==
- Anmerkungen eines Patrioten ("Observations of a Patriot"), 1998
- Setzen wir Deutschland wieder in den Sattel ("Germany back in the Saddle"), 2004

Ferdinand, 4th Prince of Bismarck House of Bismarck-Schönhausen Cadet branch of the House of Bismarck Born: 22 November 1930 Died: 23 July 2019
Titles in pretence
Preceded by Otto Christian Archibald von Bismarck	— TITULAR — Prince of Bismarck; 24 December 1975 – 23 July 2019	Succeeded by Carl von Bismarck
