= Bredow =

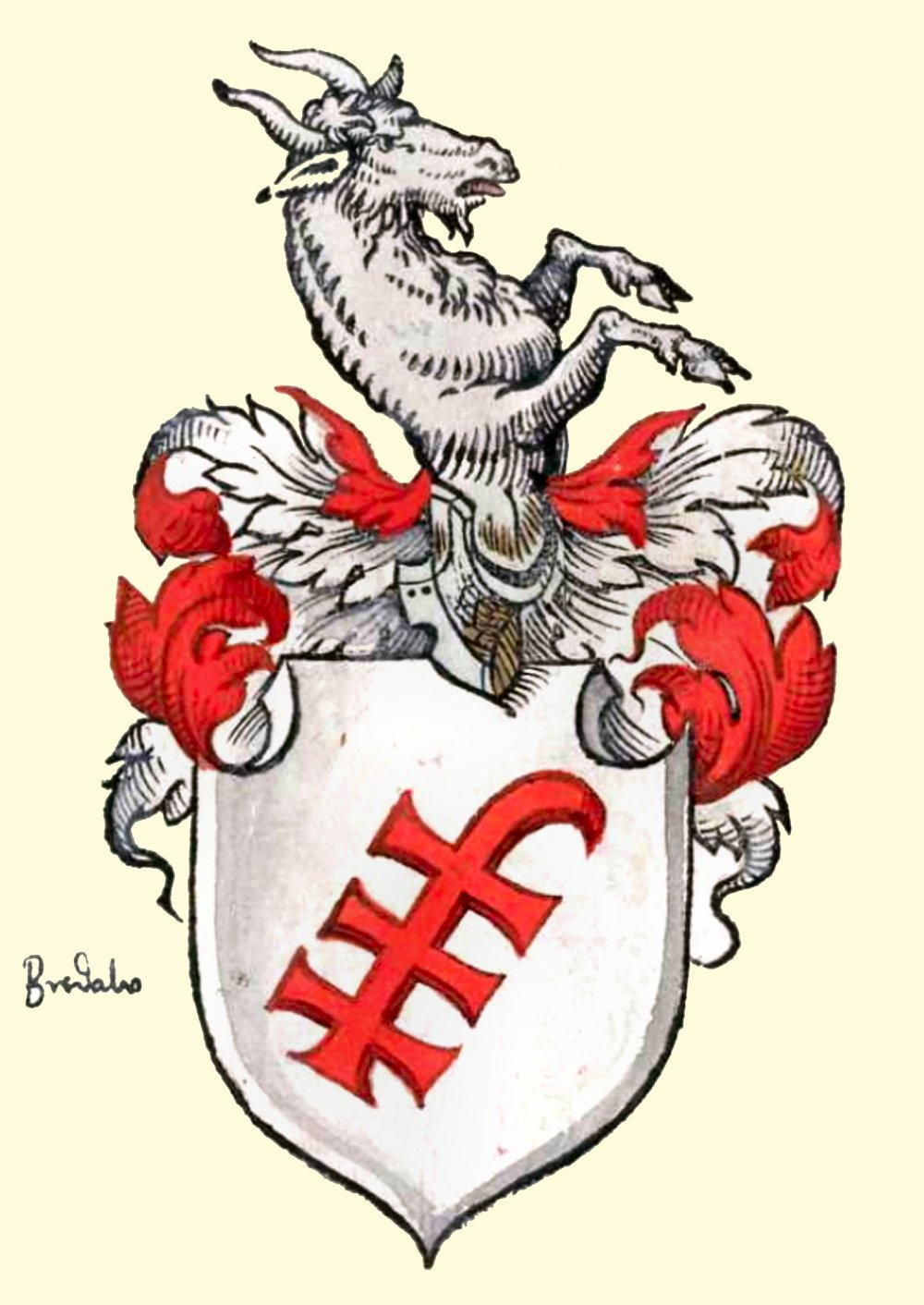
Coat of arms of the Bredow family

Bredow is also the name of an old German noble family originated from Mittelmark and a German surname.

== Notable people ==
- Reinhard Bredow (born 1947), East German luger
- Ferdinand von Bredow (1884–1934), German Major and head of the Abwehr (1932–1933)
- Adalbert von Bredow (1814–1890), German soldier and war hero
- Gottfried Gabriel Bredow (1773–1814), German historian
- Hans Bredow (1879–1959), German engineer
- Ilse von Bredow (1922–2014), German author
- Ingo von Bredow (1939–2015), German sailor and Olympic medalist
- Kaspar Ludwig von Bredow (1685–1773), tutor of Frederick the Great.
- Frederick Siegmund von Bredow (1683–1759), General of Frederick the Great
- Asmus Ehrenreich von Bredow (1693–1756), Lieutenant General, Governor of Kolberg

Bredow may refer to:

- Szczecin-Drzetowo, a suburb of Szczecin, known in German as Stettin-Bredow
