= Otto Christian Archibald von Bismarck =

German politician and diplomat (1897–1975)

Otto Christian Archibald
- Prince of Bismarck
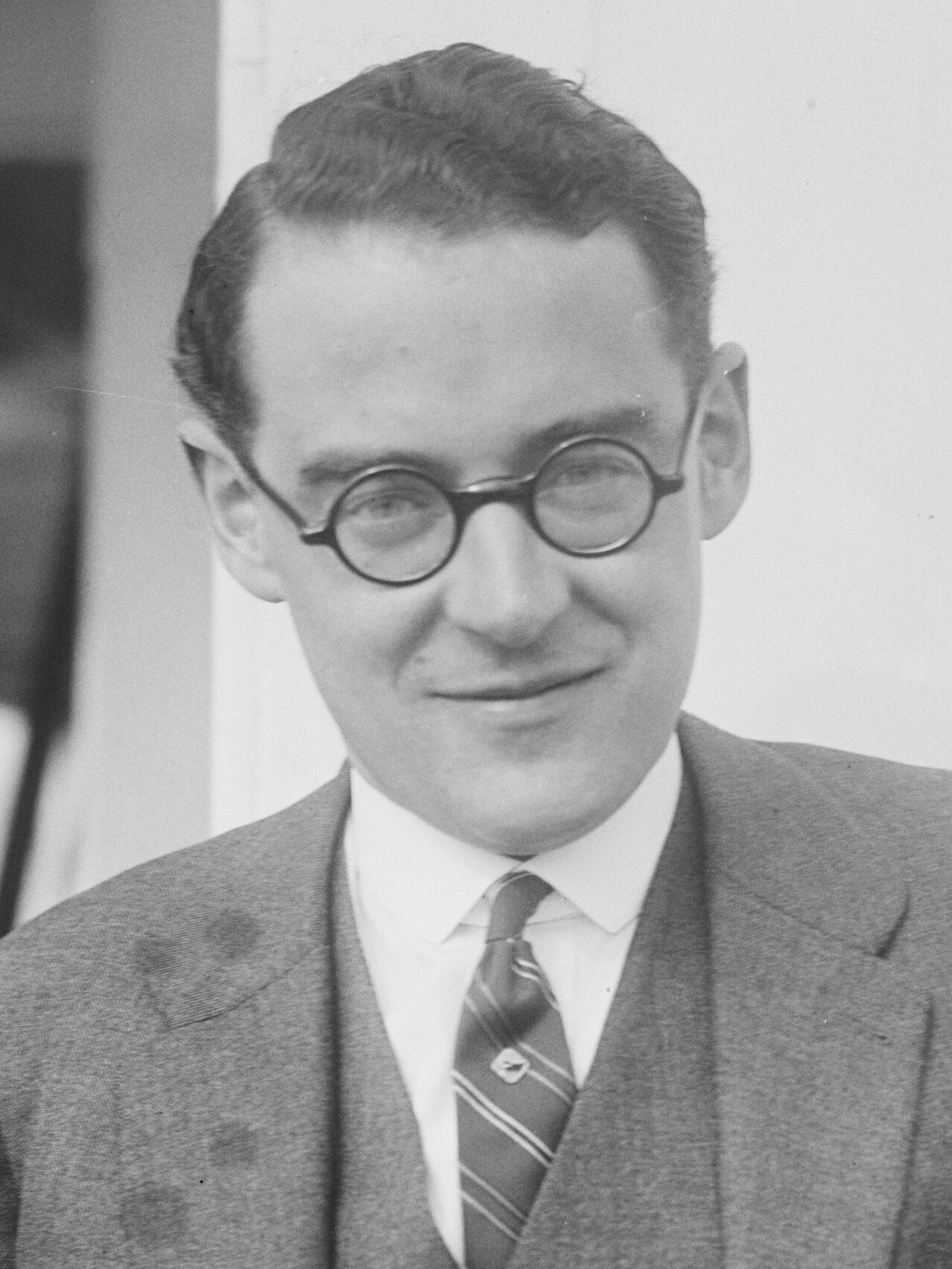

Prince of Bismarck
- Tenure: 18 September 1904 – 24 December 1975
- Predecessor: Herbert, Prince of Bismarck
- Successor: Ferdinand, Prince of Bismarck
- Born: 25 September 1897; Schönhausen, Saxony-Anhalt, German Empire
- Died: 24 December 1975 (aged 78); Friedrichsruh, Schleswig-Holstein, West Germany
- Burial: Friedrichsruh
- Spouse: Ann-Mari Tengbom
- Issue: Countess Mari Ann von Bismarck; Ferdinand, Prince of Bismarck; Count Maximilian von Bismarck-Schönhausen; Countess Gunilla von Bismarck-Schönhausen; Count Leopold von Bismarck-Schönhausen
Names
- Otto Christian Archibald Fürst von Bismarck
- House: Bismarck
- Father: Herbert von Bismarck
- Mother: Countess Marguerite, Countess of Hoyos

Member of the Bundestag
- In office 6 October 1953 – 17 October 1965

Member of the Reichstag
- In office 1924–1928

Personal details
- Party: DNVP (until 1933); Nazi (1933–1945); CDU (1950s–1975)

Styles of The Prince of Bismarck
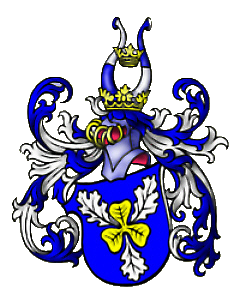
- Reference style: His Serene Highness
- Spoken style: Your Serene Highness

Otto Christian Archibald, Prince of Bismarck (25 September 1897 – 24 December 1975) was a German politician and diplomat, and the Prince of Bismarck from 1904 to his death (since 1919 only as a part of his name).

== Life ==
Bismarck was born in Schönhausen, Brandenburg. He was the eldest of the three sons of Herbert von Bismarck, as well as the grandson of the German chancellor Otto von Bismarck and elder brother of German Resistance figure Gottfried Graf von Bismarck-Schönhausen. Bismarck was six when his father died and he inherited his family estate in Schönhausen. A lawyer, he joined the diplomatic service in 1927, serving in Stockholm (1927–28), London (1928–1937), with the Foreign Ministry in Berlin (1937–1940), as Envoy to Rome (Kingdom of Italy) (1940–1943), and finally as head of the Italian section of the Foreign Ministry (1943–44).

Bismarck was a member of the DNVP (a national-conservative party) in the Weimar Republic, and served as a Member of Parliament from 1924 to 1928. He joined the Nazi Party in 1933. In 1935, he became a member of the Anglo-German Fellowship which aimed to build up friendship between the United Kingdom and Germany.

=== World War II ===
Whilst stationed in Rome during the Second World War, Bismarck would pass on German intelligence to the Italian Foreign Office and privately speak ill of the Nazi regime, in particular Ribbentrop, Goering, and Hitler. "The Prince used to tell Italian Foreign Office officials much of what he knew, but, as Ciano discovered, 'he was hellishly afraid of being found out, and implored me in Heaven's name not to pass his confidential information to anyone.' He was convinced of the inevitability of Germany's defeat but did not, unfortunately, mount the big political guns which had so often enabled his grandfather to avert disaster." Of Bismarck and the Nazi alliance with Italy, King Umberto II said, "The military element is strong in Germany, and even Bismarck who was truly exceptionally intelligent, had to submit to it."

In 1942, Bismarck played a role in the disclosure of Nazi intelligence that allowed Balkan Jews to be saved. Jews, mostly from Croatia, had fled to the parts of Yugoslavia which the Italian army occupied during 1941 and had since that time lived in peace under the protection of the Royal Italian Army. They had run from the unsystematic butchery of the Croatian fascists, the Ustaši, but by the middle of 1942 they were threatened with the systematic extermination planned for them under the Nazi "new order" in Europe. In August 1942, the German government formally asked the Italian government to hand them over. Mussolini agreed; a handful of Italian diplomats and generals said no. By refusing the German request and disobeying an explicit order of the Duce, the conspirators set a perilous course which in the end crossed not merely the murderous ambition of Mussolini but that of Hitler, Himmler and the SS. At the start, they had no conclusive evidence of what is now known as "the final solution", but the Italian Foreign Ministry had received a broad hint. On 18 August 1942, Prince Bismarck, called on the Marchese Lanza d'Ajeta at the Italian Foreign Ministry. Bismarck had orders to demand that the Italian government instruct its military authorities "to actuate those measures devised by the Germans and the Croatians for a transfer in mass of the Jews of Croatia to territories in the East". Prince Bismarck let slip the fact that the measures would lead to the "dispersion and elimination" of such Jews. Indeed, in the original text d'Ajeta had recorded the word 'liquidation'. Italy now faced the holocaust squarely. Bismarck himself had whispered the truth to the cabinet chief of Count Ciano: the Jews were not being transferred to the east to work but to die. Mussolini was perfectly prepared to grant his Nazi ally the bodies of a few thousand Croatian Jews. In his large hand, he wrote "nulla osta" (no objection) across the memorandum. Mussolini apparently did not care what happened to the Jews of Croatia or refused to believe Bismarck's hint. It was that 'order' of Mussolini's that the conspirators decided to disobey.

He worked as an envoy at the German Embassy at the Quirinal in Rome until August 1943. From November 1943 to November 1944, Bismarck was head of the Italy Committee in the Foreign Office in Berlin. He was then released because of his contacts with members of the resistance group, however lack of evidence and the legend of the name Bismarck saved him from personal persecution. He then continued to manage the family property Friedrichsruh near Hamburg.

At the end of the war, Bismarck's home of Friedrichsruh became one of the headquarters of the "White Buses" operation undertaken by the Swedish Red Cross and the Danish government in the spring of 1945 to rescue concentration camp inmates in areas under Nazi control and transport them to Sweden, a neutral country. Although the operation was initially targeted at saving citizens of Scandinavian countries, it rapidly expanded to include citizens of other countries. Folke Bernadotte, Count of Wisborg, a Swedish nobleman and diplomat who was then vice-president of the Swedish Red Cross, negotiated the release of about 31,000 prisoners from German concentration camps. Bismarck's wife Princess Ann-Marie had been a lifelong friend of Bernadotte having been classmates at school in Stockholm. In spite of its clearly visible Red Cross markings on the roof, the Friedrichsruh manor house was destroyed during a RAF raid in the last days of World War II, due to the (false) rumor that Heinrich Himmler was hiding there. After the war, the premises were rebuilt at the behest of Bismarck.

=== Post-war career ===
In the 1950s, Bismarck considered becoming a member of the FDP (the liberal party), which offered him a nomination for Parliament, but eventually joined the Christian-conservative CDU instead. He served as a Member of Parliament for the constituency of Herzogtum Lauenburg (Duchy of Lauenburg; his grandfather held the title Duke of Lauenburg) from 1953 to 1965, and as a member of the foreign affairs committee. He was also a member of the Parliamentary Assembly of the Council of Europe, and served as its vice president from 1959 to 1960 and from 1961 to 1966. He was also chairman of the Deutsche Parlamentarische Gesellschaft from 1957 to 1961. He received the Great Cross of Merit in 1965. He died in West Germany.

== Personal life ==
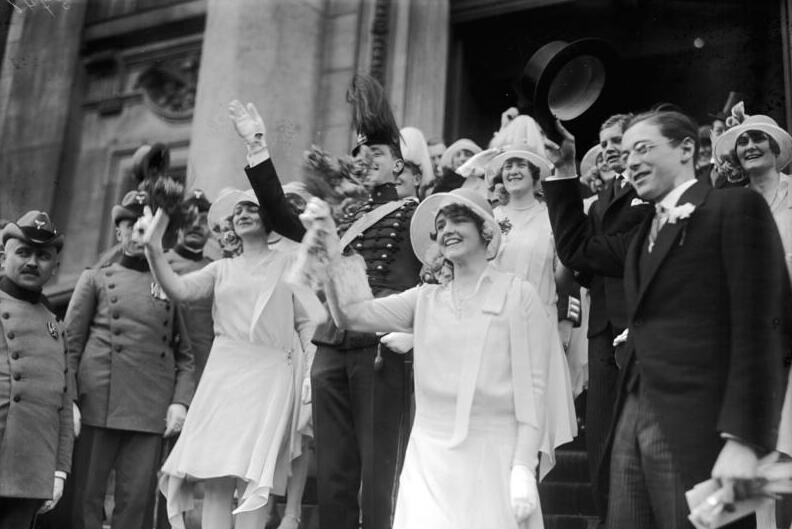
The wedding of the Prince of Bismarck and Ann-Mari Tengbom, in the Berliner Dom, 1928. President Paul von Hindenburg, members of the cabinet and representatives of the Swedish embassy were present. Paul von Lettow-Vorbeck is visible in the lower left corner.

Bismarck married Ann-Mari Tengbom (1907–1999), a native of Sweden, daughter of Ivar Tengbom, on 18 April 1928, and they had six children:

- Mari Ann (1929–1981).
- Ferdinand von Bismarck (1930–2019), late head of the princely House of Bismarck.
- Carl Alexander (1935–1992).
- Maximilian Viktor (born 1947).
- Gunilla Margaretha (born 1949), philanthropist.
- Eduard Leopold (born 1951).

His grandson Carl-Eduard von Bismarck served as a Member of Parliament, representing the CDU for the constituency Herzogtum Lauenburg, from 2005 to 2007.

== See also ==
- House of Bismarck

Otto Christian Archibald, 3rd Prince of Bismarck House of Bismarck-Schönhausen Cadet branch of the House of Bismarck Born: 25 September 1897 Died: 24 December 1975
German nobility
Preceded by Herbert von Bismarck	Prince of Bismarck; 18 September 1904 – 11 August 1919	Succeeded by German nobility titles abolished
Titles in pretence
Loss of title	— TITULAR — Prince of Bismarck; 11 August 1919 – 24 December 1975	Succeeded by Ferdinand von Bismarck
Political offices
Preceded by	Member of Parliament; 1924–1928	Succeeded by
Preceded by	Member of Parliament for the Duchy of Lauenburg; 1953–1965	Succeeded by
Preceded by	Chairman of the Deutsche Parlamentarische Gesellschaft; 1957–1961	Succeeded by
Diplomatic posts
Preceded by	German Envoy to the Kingdom of Italy; 1940–1943	Succeeded by
