= Carl von Bismarck =

Swiss-German politician (born 1961)

Carl-Eduard
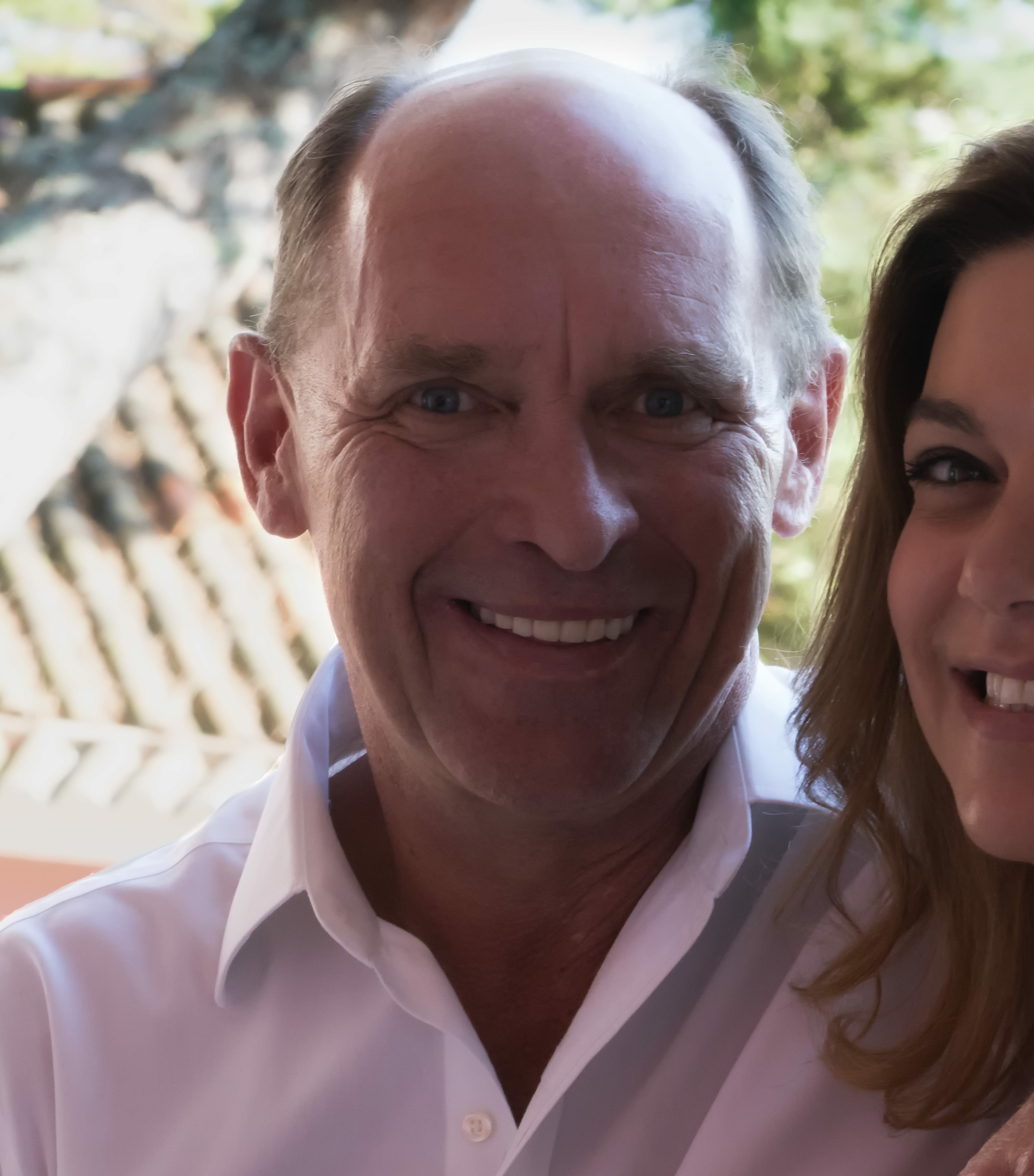
- Von Bismarck in 2017

Prince of Bismarck
- Tenure: 23 July 2019 – present
- Predecessor: Ferdinand von Bismarck
- Heir: Alexei Count von Bismarck-Schoenhausen
- Born: Carl-Eduard Otto Wolfgang Graf von Bismarck-Schönhausen; 16 February 1961 (age 65); Zurich, Switzerland
- Spouse: Laura Harring (m. 1987; div. 1989) Celia Demaurex (m. 1997; div. 2004) Nathalie Bariman (m. 2004; div. 2014) Alessandra Silvestri-Levy (m. 2016)
- Issue: Count Alexei von Bismarck-Schönhausen; Countess Grace von Bismarck-Schönhausen
- House: Bismarck
- Father: Ferdinand, Prince von Bismarck
- Mother: Countess Elisabeth Lippens

Carl-Eduard, Prince of Bismarck (Carl-Eduard Otto Wolfgang; born 16 February 1961), often known as Carl von Bismarck, is a German politician. A member of the Christian Democratic Union, he sat in the Bundestag from 2005 to 2007. He is the current head of the Princely line of the House of Bismarck. His oldest son Alexei Count von Bismarck-Schoenhausen is his successor.

== Background and education ==
Born on 16 February 1961 in Zurich, Switzerland, as Count of Bismarck-Schönhausen, Carl von Bismarck is a member of the princely House of Bismarck and the son of the lawyer and landowner Ferdinand von Bismarck and the Belgian countess Elisabeth Lippens. He is the great-great-grandson of the German chancellor Otto von Bismarck.

After receiving his Abitur in 1982, von Bismarck completed his two years of military service at the Bismarck-Kaserne in Wentorf, West Germany.

In 1985, von Bismarck concluded his training in capital markets investing at Citibank and worked for Shearson Lehman in New York. In 1988 he received his bachelor's degree in international business from UCLA.

== Career ==
=== Business ===
In 1989, von Bismarck was requested by his father to return to West Germany. Between 1989 and 1992, he worked for the company Investor Treuhand in Düsseldorf. Since 1993 he worked for the Princely Bismarck Administration (Fürstlich von Bismarck'schen Verwaltung) in Friedrichsruh.

=== Politics ===
Bismarck became a member of the CDU in 1995, and was elected vice-chairman of the CDU in Lauenburg in 1999 (his ancestor, Otto von Bismarck, had been the nominal Duke of Lauenburg in the 1890s). When Peter Harry Carstensen became Prime Minister of Schleswig-Holstein, Bismarck replaced him in the Bundestag, the German parliament. In the 2005 federal election, he won his constituency with a plurality (44.4%) of the vote.

== Personal life ==
Von Bismarck was previously married to Mexican-American actress Laura Harring (1987–1989), Swiss heiress and humanitarian Celia Demaurex (1997–2004), and Canadian designer Nathalie Bariman (2004–2014). He married Brazilian art writer and curator Alessandra Silvestri-Levy in 2016.

Von Bismarck has two children with Nathalie Bariman: a son and heir apparent to the princely title, Count Alexei von Bismarck-Schönhausen, and a daughter, Countess Grace von Bismarck-Schönhausen. Bariman is Jewish, and they married in a Jewish ceremony. German Chancellor Angela Merkel is reported to have told the couple, "You two have united history... the next Prince of Bismarck will be a mix of both religions."

== See also ==
- Gottfried von Bismarck (brother)
- Mona von Bismarck
- House of Bismarck

Carl-Eduard, 5th Prince of Bismarck House of Bismarck-Schönhausen Cadet branch of the House of Bismarck Born: 16 February 1961
Titles in pretence
Preceded by Ferdinand von Bismarck	— TITULAR — Prince of Bismarck; 23 July 2019 – present	Incumbent; Heir: Alexei, Count of Bismarck
