= Herbert von Bismarck =

German politician (1849–1904)

Herbert
- Prince of Bismarck
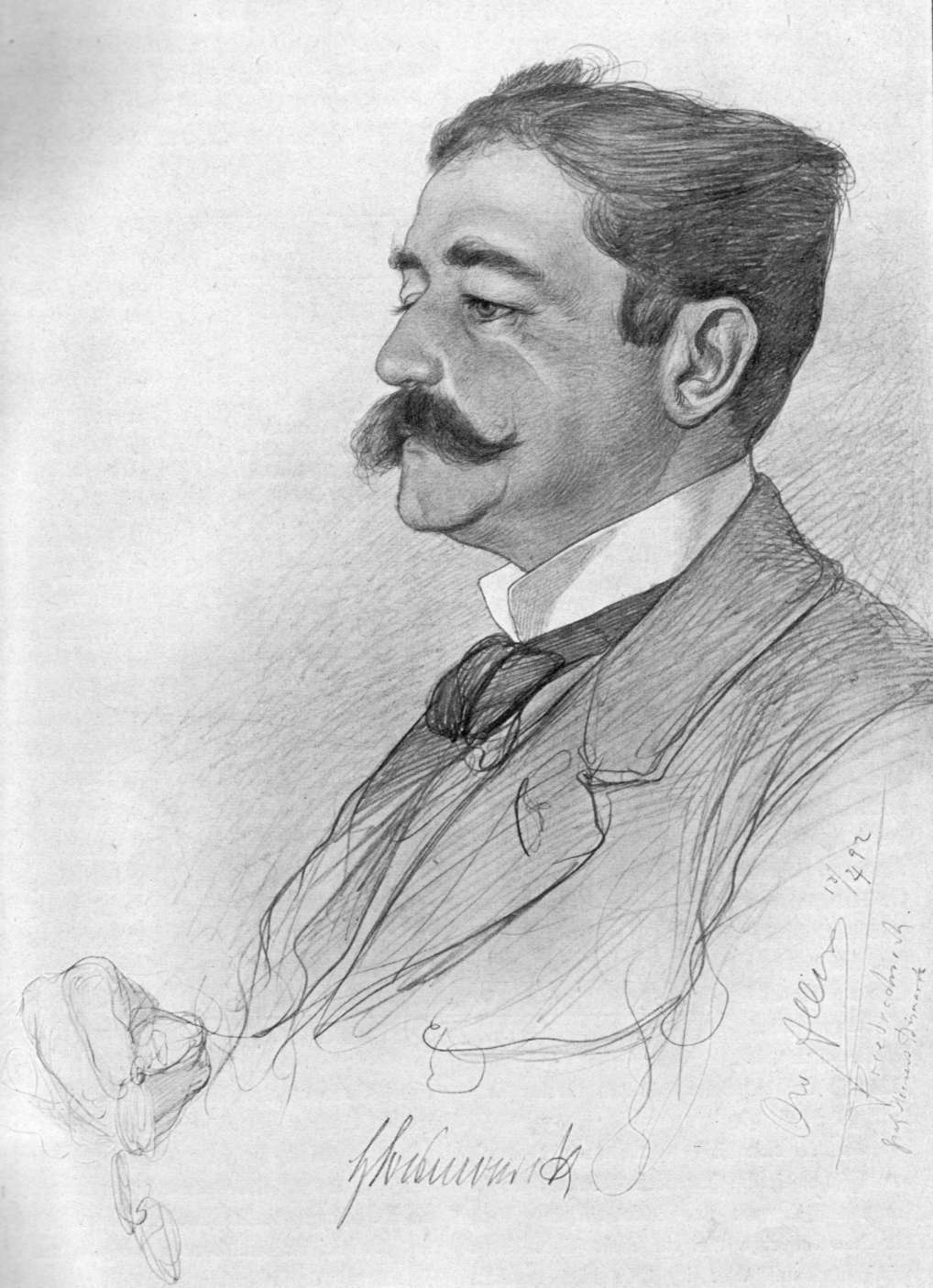
- Herbert von Bismarck (1892, by C. W. Allers)
- Born: Nikolaus Heinrich Ferdinand Herbert Graf von Bismarck-Schönhausen; 28 December 1849; Berlin, Kingdom of Prussia, German Confederation
- Died: 18 September 1904 (aged 54); Friedrichsruh, German Empire
- Noble family: Bismarck
- Spouses: Countess Marguerite, Countess Hoyos (m. 1892)
- Issue: Countess Hannah Leopoldine Alice von Bismarck-Schönhausen; Countess Maria Goedela von Bismarck-Schönhausen; Otto Christian Archibald von Bismarck; Gottfried Graf von Bismarck-Schönhausen; Count Albrecht Edzard Heinrich Karl von Bismarck-Schönhausen
- Father: Otto von Bismarck
- Mother: Johanna von Puttkamer

Styles of The Prince of Bismarck
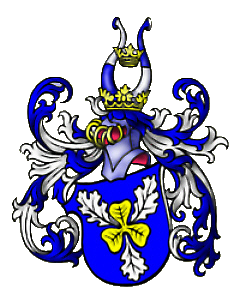
- Reference style: His Serene Highness
- Spoken style: Your Serene Highness

Nikolaus Heinrich Ferdinand Herbert, Fürst von Bismarck (28 December 1849 – 18 September 1904) was a German politician, who served as Foreign Secretary from 1886 to 1890. His political career was closely tied to that of his father, Otto von Bismarck, and he left office a few days after his father's dismissal. He succeeded his father as the 2nd Prince of Bismarck in 1898. He was born in Berlin and died in Friedrichsruh.

== Biography ==
Nikolaus Heinrich Ferdinand Herbert Graf von Bismarck-Schönhausen was born in Berlin, the oldest son of Otto von Bismarck and his wife, Johanna, née von Puttkamer. He had an older sister, Marie (b. 1848), and a younger brother, Wilhelm (b. 1852). He fought in the Franco-Prussian War, sustaining a bullet wound through the left leg during a cavalry charge at the Battle of Mars-La-Tour. He joined the diplomatic service in 1874 on his father's wishes. Bismarck attempted to gain influence with the heir to the German throne, Prince Wilhelm, by appealing to his narcissism. In June 1884, he wrote to thank Wilhelm for a portrait that Wilhelm had given to him after they returned from a state visit to Russia:

I beg Your Royal Highness most subserviently graciously to permit me to lay at your feet my deeply reverent and heartfelt thanks for Graciously Granting me the beautiful picture.... Long it is since I have been so joyful as the joy which Your Royal Highness accorded me by granting me the portrait with your very own Highest signature. For me, the words beneath the picture render it the most valuable possession which I own, and I cannot find words to express how happy Your Royal Highness has made me. I am truly overwhelmed by the Good Grace of Your Royal Highness.... The few days which to my greatest joy I was able to spend directly at the service of Your Royal Highness will always be among the loveliest in my life and... it will be my sole ambition for all time to stand prepared to receive Your Highest orders and to serve you with all my meagre powers.

Bismarck became Under-Secretary and acting head of the Foreign Office in 1885, and the following year, he was appointed the State Secretary for Foreign Affairs. He additionally was appointed Minister of State of the Kingdom of Prussia in 1888. He once said, "My father is the only person who can handle this business" In 1890, when Kaiser Wilhelm II called for the resignation of Otto von Bismarck as Chancellor, Herbert von Bismarck also resigned as State Secretary, despite Wilhelm's attempts to retain him so that his de facto dismissal of his father would "look better in the eyes of the world".

== Personal life ==
Bismarck had wanted to marry Princess Elisabeth zu Carolath-Beuthen in 1881, but his father would not allow it, as she was a Catholic divorcée and was ten years older than Herbert. The Chancellor pressured his son with tears, blackmail and threats to disinherit him by getting Kaiser Wilhelm I to change the primogeniture statutes. That experience left Herbert a very bitter and alcoholic man. He once shot five bullets through a Foreign Office window, to be told he may have hit someone. He replied, "Officials have to be kept in a permanent state of irritation and alarm; the moment that ceases they stop working".

On 21 June 1892 in Vienna, he married Countess Marguerite, Countess of Hoyos, a member of the originally Spanish House of Hoyos from Hungary. She herself was half-English and a grand-daughter of Robert Whitehead, the inventor of the torpedo. They had five children:

- Countess Hannah Leopoldine Alice von Bismarck-Schönhausen (1893–1971), married Leopold von Bredow (1875–1933)
- Countess Maria Goedela von Bismarck-Schönhausen (1896–1981), married Hermann Graf Keyserling (1880–1946)
- HSH Otto Christian Archibald, Prince von Bismarck (1897–1975), married Ann-Mari Tengbom (1907–1999)
- Count Gottfried Alexander Georg Herbert von Bismarck-Schönhausen (1901–1949), married Countess Melanie, Countess of Hoyos (1916–1949)
- Count Albrecht Edzard Heinrich Karl von Bismarck-Schönhausen (1903–1970), married Mona Travis Strader (1897–1983).

He was at his father's bedside when the latter died on 30 July 1898.

He died in Friedrichsruh on 18 September 1904.

The capital of the German colonial administration of German New Guinea was called Herbertshöhe (now Kokopo) in his honor.

== Orders and decorations ==
German honours

- Prussia:
  - Iron Cross (1870), 2nd Class on Black Band
  - Knight of the Royal Crown Order, 3rd Class, 5 December 1878
  - Knight of the Red Eagle, 2nd Class with Oak Leaves, 1 April 1885; 1st Class
  - Grand Commander's Cross of the Royal House Order of Hohenzollern
- Baden: Grand Cross of the Zähringer Lion, 1887
- Bavaria:
  - Grand Cross of the Merit Order of St. Michael, 1886
  - Grand Cross of Merit of the Bavarian Crown, 1888
- Brunswick: Grand Cross of the Order of Henry the Lion, 1889
- (Saxe-Coburg and Gotha) (Duchy of Saxe-Altenburg) (Saxe-Meiningen) Ernestine duchies: Grand Cross of the Saxe-Ernestine House Order
- Hesse and by Rhine: Grand Cross of the Merit Order of Philip the Magnanimous, 28 March 1886
- Oldenburg: Grand Cross of Honour of the Order of Duke Peter Friedrich Ludwig
- Saxony: Grand Cross of the Albert Order, with Star in Silver, 1887
- Waldeck and Pyrmont: Order of Merit, 1st Class
- Württemberg:
  - Grand Cross of the Friedrich Order, 1887
  - Grand Cross of the Württemberg Crown, 1888

Foreign honours

- (Austrian Empire) (Kingdom of Hungary) Austria-Hungary:
  - Commander of the Order of Franz Joseph, with Star, 1878
  - Knight of the Iron Crown, 1st Class, 1884
  - Grand Cross of the Imperial Order of Leopold, 1888; in Brilliants, 1889
- Belgium: Grand Cordon of the Order of Leopold
- Denmark: Grand Cross of the Dannebrog, in Brilliants, 30 July 1888
- French Empire: Officer of the Legion of Honour
- Kingdom of Greece: Grand Cross of the Redeemer
- Empire of Japan: Grand Cordon of the Rising Sun
- Kingdom of Italy:
  - Grand Cross of Saints Maurice and Lazarus
  - Commander of the Crown of Italy
- Netherlands: Grand Cross of the Netherlands Lion
- Persian Empire:
  - Order of the August Portrait
  - Order of the Lion and the Sun, 1st Class in Brilliants
- Ottoman Empire:
  - Order of Osmanieh, 1st Class in Brilliants
  - Order of the Medjidie, 1st Class
- Kingdom of Portugal: Grand Cross of Our Lady of Conception
- Qing dynasty: Order of the Double Dragon, Class I Grade III
- Kingdom of Romania: Grand Cross of the Star of Romania
- Russian Empire:
  - Knight of St. Alexander Nevsky, in Brilliants
  - Knight of St. Anna, 2nd Class in Brilliants and with Swords
- Siam: Grand Cross of the Crown of Siam
- Spain: Grand Cross of the Order of Charles III, 16 July 1885
- Sweden-Norway: Commander Grand Cross of the Polar Star, in Brilliants, 13 June 1888

Herbert, 2nd Prince of Bismarck House of Bismarck-Schönhausen Cadet branch of the House of Bismarck Born: 28 December 1849 Died: 18 September 1904
German nobility
Preceded by Otto von Bismarck	Prince of Bismarck; 30 July 1898 – 18 September 1904	Succeeded by Otto Christian Archibald von Bismarck
