= Johanna von Puttkamer =

Prussian noblewoman (1824–1894)

- Princess of Bismarck
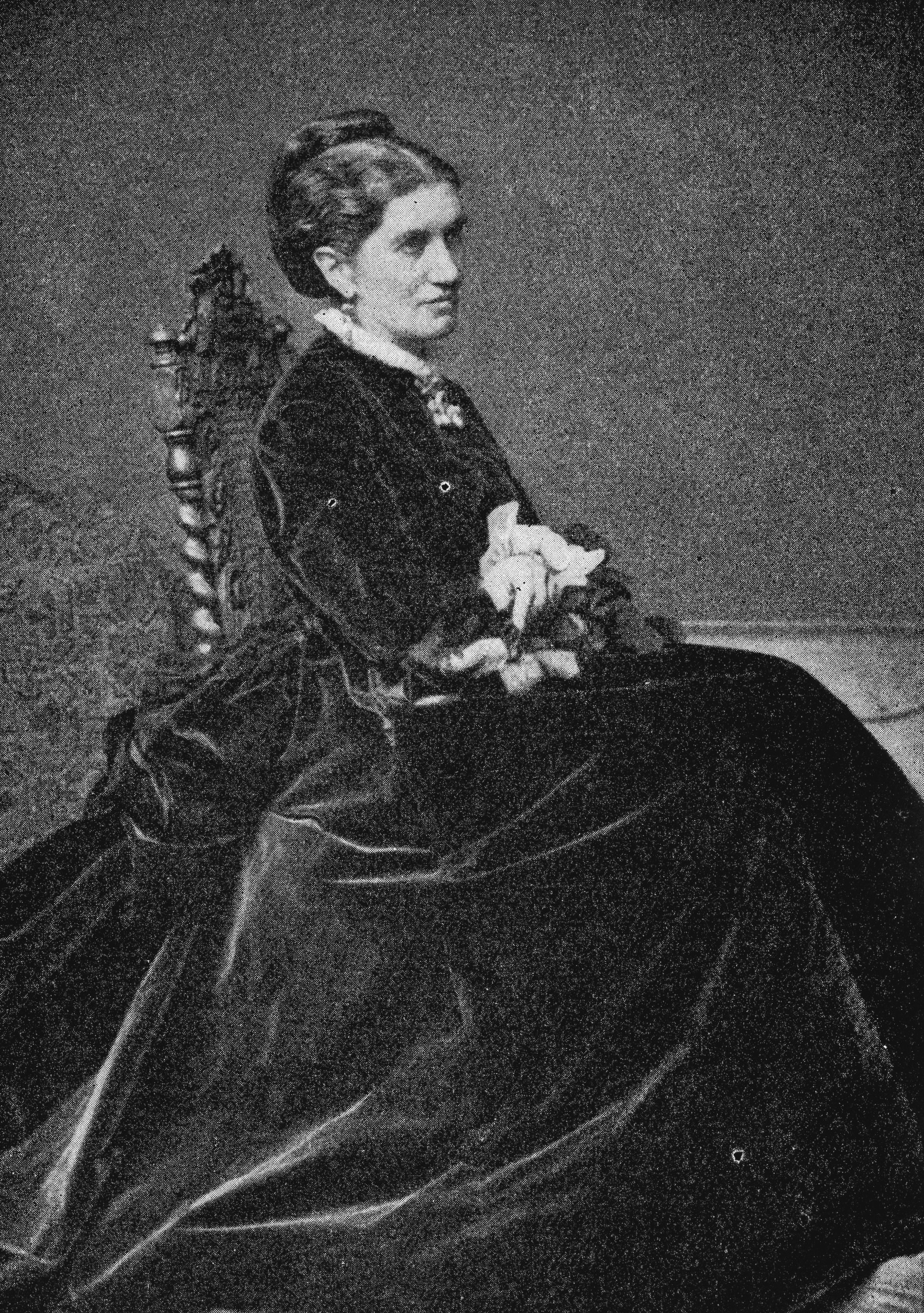
- Johanna von Bismarck in 1878
- Born: Johanna Friederike Charlotte Dorothea Eleonore von Puttkamer; 11 April 1824; Viartlum, Pomerania, Prussia
- Died: 27 November 1894 (aged 70); Varzin, Pomerania, German Empire
- Buried: Bismarck Mausoleum, Schleswig-Holstein, Germany
- Noble family: Puttkamer
- Spouse: Otto von Bismarck (m. 1847)
- Issue: Marie von Bismarck; Herbert von Bismarck; Wilhelm von Bismarck
- Father: Heinrich von Puttkamer
- Mother: Luitgarde Agnes von Glasenapp

Johanna, Princess of Bismarck, Duchess of Lauenburg (born Johanna Friederike Charlotte Dorothea Eleonore von Puttkamer; 11 April 1824 – 27 November 1894) was a German noblewoman and the wife of the first Chancellor of Germany, Otto von Bismarck.

== Early life ==
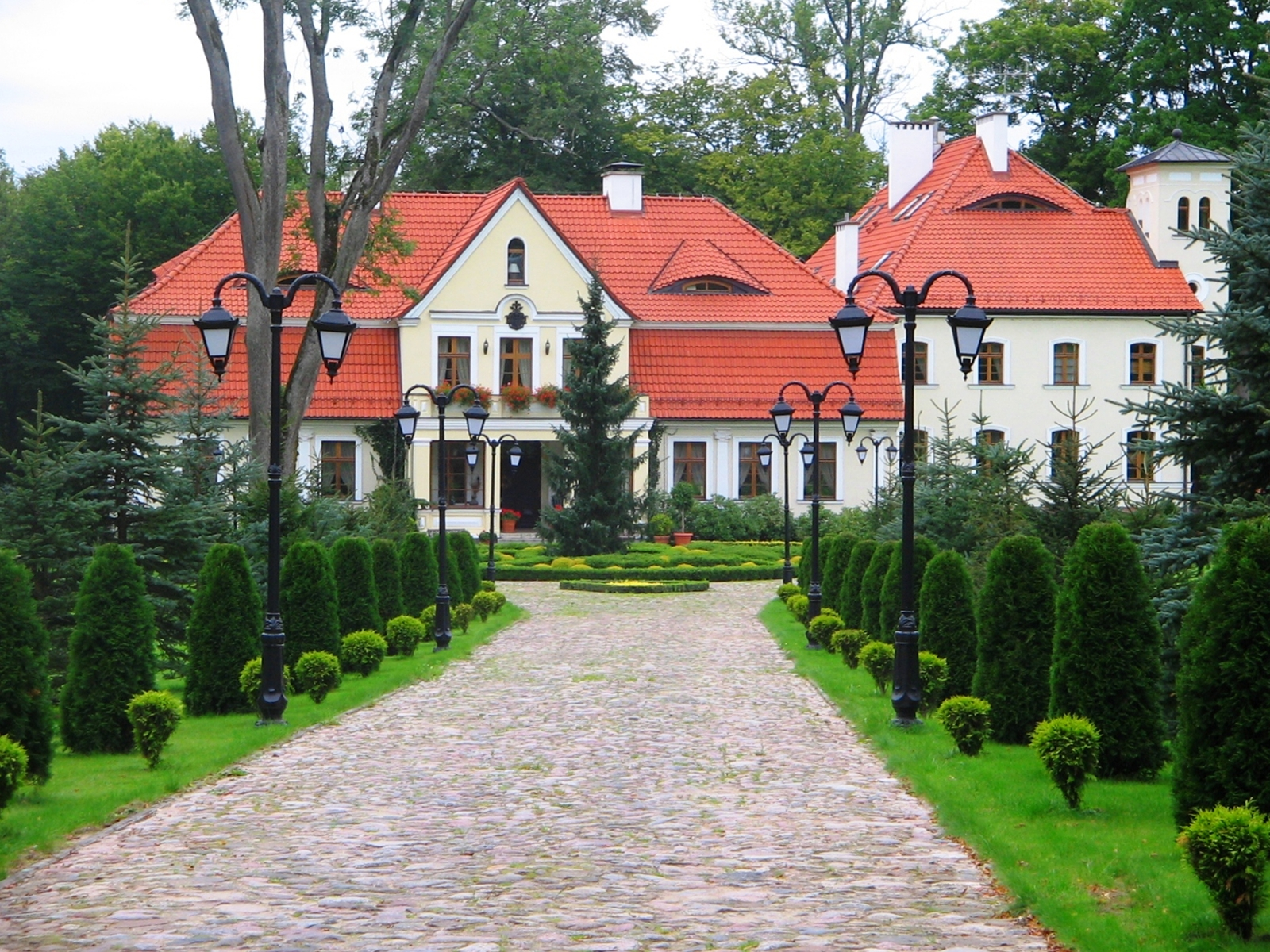
Reinfeld palace, Puttkamer family estate where Johanna grew up

She was born at Viartlum manor near Rummelsburg in the Prussian Province of Pomerania (present-day Wiatrołom, Poland), the daughter of Heinrich von Puttkamer (1789–1871) and his wife, Luitgarde Agnes von Glasenapp (1799–1863). Her ancestors of the Puttkamer family, first mentioned in the 13th century, belonged to the circle of Uradel families of Farther Pomerania and were known for their devoted pietism. Johanna grew up in neighbouring Reinfeld palace (Barnowiec), which her father acquired shortly after her birth.

== Life ==
Johanna met Otto von Bismarck, then owner of Kniephof estate (Konarzewo), in 1844. The Prussian Junker had associated with Pomeranian pietist circles around Adolf von Thadden-Trieglaff (1796-1882), mainly because he had desperately fallen in love with Thadden's daughter Marie. The young woman appreciated his advances, nevertheless, as she was already engaged to Bismarck's school friend Moritz von Blanckenburg, she introduced him to her friend, Johanna von Puttkamer, at her wedding ceremony. However, not until the married couple took both Otto and Johanna on a journey to the Harz mountains in 1846 did the two seem to become closer to each other. Marie's sudden death from meningitis in November 1846 tipped the scales and Bismarck finally asked Heinrich von Puttkamer for the hand of his daughter.

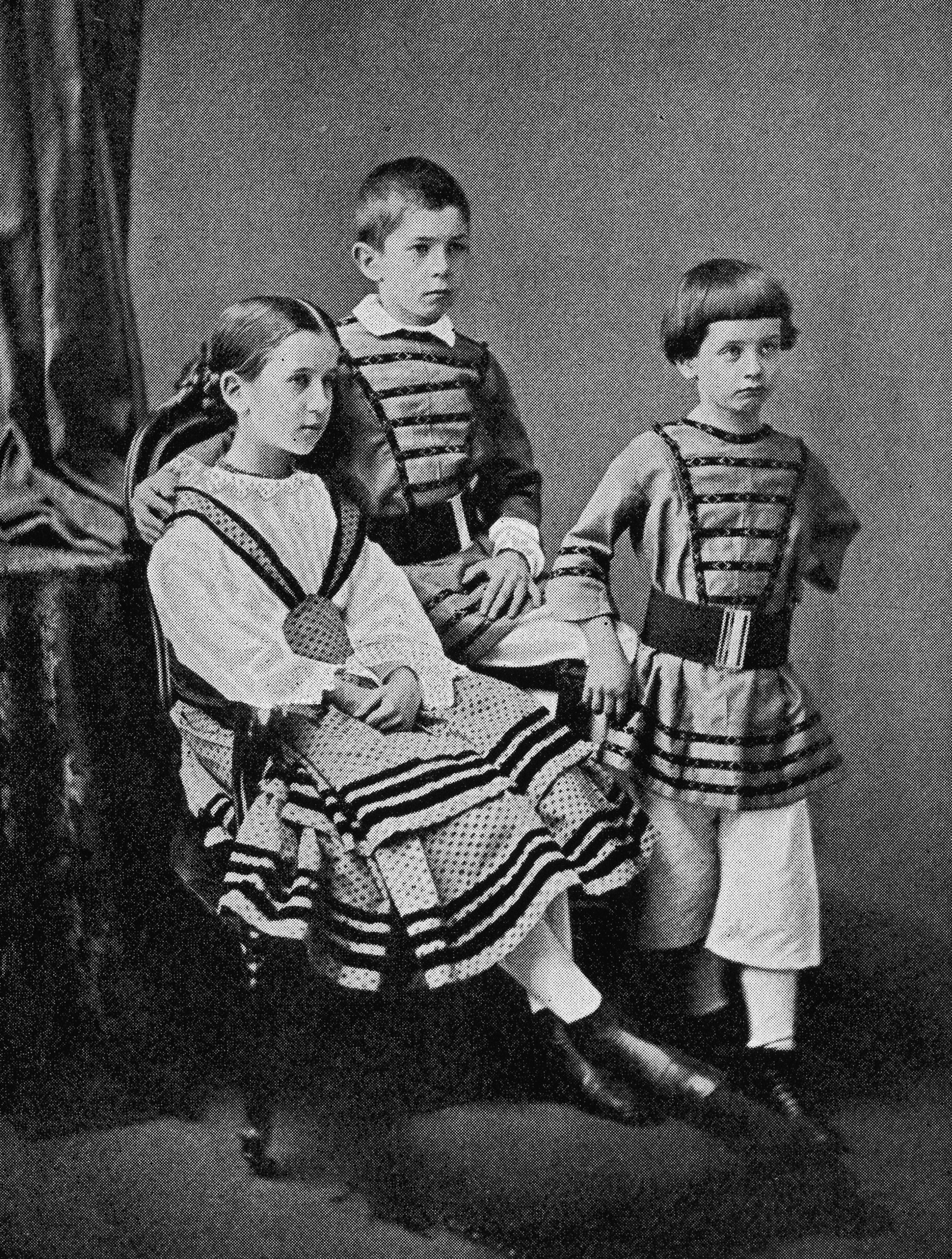
Marie, Herbert and Wilhelm von Bismarck, c. 1855

== Marriage and issue ==
On 28 July 1847 Johanna married Otto von Bismarck in the parish church of Alt-Kolziglow (modern Kołczygłowy) near Reinfeld. The couple had three children:

- Marie (1848–1926), married in 1878 to Count Kuno zu Rantzau (1843-1917)
- Herbert (1849–1904), diplomat and politician, had an affair with Princess Elisabeth zu Carolath-Beuthen, née Countess von Hatzfeldt-Trachenberg, married Countess Marguerite Hoyos von und zu Stichsenstein (1871-1945)
- Wilhelm (1852–1901), administrative official, married his cousin, Sibylle von Arnim (1864-1945)

== Later life ==
Johanna was a loyal friend and an essential supporter throughout her husband's career. Though Otto von Bismarck never completely overcame his love for the late Marie von Thadden (1822-1846) and even entered an affair with Princess Katarina Orlova (1840-1875), born Princess Trubetskoy, wife of the Russian envoy Nikolay Alexeyevich Orlov, his marriage with Johanna appeared to be a happy one. Johanna's considerable influence on her husband's politics is documented by their voluminous correspondence. Nevertheless, she was rivaled by sharp-witted liberal salonnières like Countess Marie von Schleinitz.

== Death ==
Johanna died on 27 November 1894 at the Bismarck manor in Varzin (Warcino), aged 70. Her husband had a chapel built in the Varzin park, where she was buried. Later, her mortal remains were transferred to the Bismarck Mausoleum in Friedrichsruh.
