= Prince of Bismarck =

Title of the German nobility

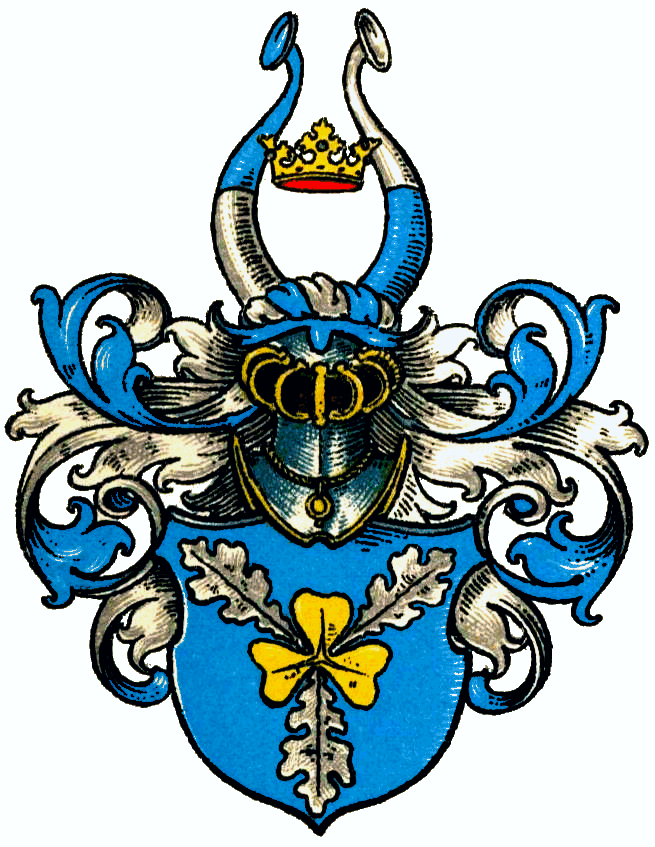
Arms of the House of Bismarck

Princely arms of Otto von Bismarck

Prince of Bismarck (German: Fürst von Bismarck) is a title of the German nobility. The German word Fürst historically denotes a sovereign ruler, and is a higher title than Prinz; however both titles are conventionally rendered as Prince in English. The Prince of Bismarck holds the style of Serene Highness.

The title was created in 1871 for the statesman Otto von Bismarck (1815–1898), who received several noble titles during the course of his career. Born into a noble Junker family (the House of Bismarck), he began life as simply "Mister (German: Herr) Otto Eduard Leopold von Bismarck".

In 1865, he was made Graf von Bismarck-Schönhausen (Count of Bismarck-Schönhausen) following the Prussian victory over Denmark in the Second War of Schleswig. Schönhausen was the Bismarck family's estate, in the Prussian province of Saxony. This hereditary comital title is borne by all of Otto von Bismarck's descendants in the male line.

After Prussia and its allies had defeated France in the Franco-Prussian War of 1870, and following the establishment of a new German Empire which followed in 1871, Bismarck was made Fürst von Bismarck (Prince of Bismarck). This hereditary princely title descends in the male line, but it is only held by the eldest son of the family.

Finally, as a consolation for his dismissal by Emperor Wilhelm II in 1890, Bismarck was made Herzog von Lauenburg (Duke of Lauenburg) for his own lifetime only, and he was accorded the hereditary style of Durchlaucht (equivalent to "Serene Highness"), held by the incumbent Prince. The Duchy of Lauenburg was one of the territories which Prussia (and Austria) seized from Denmark in 1864, and the choice of this title was therefore a nod to Bismarck's career.

Upon Bismarck's death in 1898, his dukedom became extinct and his princely title passed to his eldest son, Herbert. The current prince is the great-great-grandson of Otto von Bismarck.

== Princes of Bismarck ==
1. Otto Eduard Leopold, Prince of Bismarck (1815–1898)
2. Nikolaus Heinrich Ferdinand Herbert, Prince of Bismarck (1849–1904)
3. Otto Christian Archibald, Prince of Bismarck (1897–1975)
4. Ferdinand Herbord Ivar, Prince of Bismarck (1930–2019)
5. Carl-Eduard Otto Wolfgang Jayme Anders, Prince of Bismarck (born 1961)

The heir apparent to the title is the current prince's son, Count Alexei von Bismarck (born 2006).
