= Gottfried Graf von Bismarck-Schönhausen =

20th-century German politician

Gottfried
- Graf von Bismarck-Schönhausen
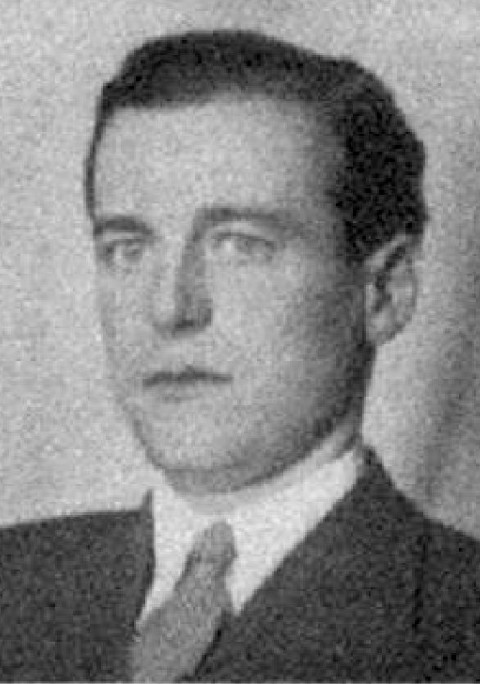
- Full name: Gottfried Alexander Georg Herbert Graf von Bismarck-Schönhausen
- Born: 9 March 1901; Berlin, German Empire
- Died: 14 September 1949 (aged 48); Verden an der Aller, Lower Saxony, West Germany
- Noble family: House of Bismarck
- Spouse: Countess Melanie Hoyos zu Stichsenstein
- Issue: Countess Vendeline von Bismarck-Schönhausen; Countess Barbara von Bismarck-Schönhausen; Count Andreas von Bismarck-Schönhausen
- Father: Herbert von Bismarck
- Mother: Countess Marguerite, Countess of Hoyos

Gottfried Graf von Bismarck-Schönhausen (9 March 1901 – 14 September 1949) was a German politician and a conspirator in the 20 July plot.

== Biography ==
Born in Berlin, Bismarck was a grandson of the 19th century Chancellor Otto von Bismarck. He was a member of the Nazi Party and, from 1933 to 1934, he was a Kreisleiter in Rügen. In March 1933, he was elected to the Reichstag from electoral constituency 6 (Pomerania) and was reelected at the next three elections through 1938. In 1935, he became chairman of the regional council (Regierungspräsident) for Stettin, and later also for Potsdam. In 1937, he married a cousin, Countess Melanie Hoyos, in Vienna.

From 1942, however, Bismarck had been opposed to the continuation of World War II, and had made contact with other members of the German aristocracy who were working against the Nazi regime – such as the Berlin police chief Wolf-Heinrich Graf von Helldorf, Colonel Claus Graf von Stauffenberg, and General Friedrich Olbricht – with the aim of starting negotiations with the western Allies. He was aware of preparations for the 20 July plot to assassinate Adolf Hitler, but was not directly involved in it.

After the failure of the plot, Bismarck's connections to the plotters were discovered. He was expelled from the SS and from the Reichstag. Because of his famous name and many powerful connections, however, he escaped the fate of most of the active plotters. He was not arrested until August and he was not tortured. In October, he was acquitted of the charges against him by the People's Court, but was nevertheless sent to Sachsenhausen concentration camp, where he was relatively well treated. He was liberated by Soviet forces in April 1945.

In September 1949, Bismarck and his wife were killed in a car accident in Verden an der Aller near Bremen.
