= Ann-Mari Tengbom =

German princess

Ann-Mari
- Princess of Bismarck
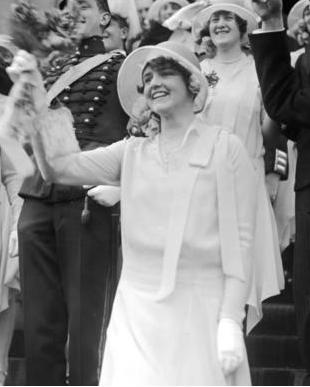
- The Princess of Bismarck on her wedding day in 1928.
- Born: 26 July 1907; Stockholm, Sweden
- Died: 22 September 1999 (aged 92); Marbella, Spain
- Noble family: Tengbom (by birth); Bismarck (by marriage)
- Spouse: Otto Christian Archibald, Prince of Bismarck (m. 1928; died 1975)
- Issue: Countess Mari Ann von Bismarck-Schönhausen; Ferdinand, Prince of Bismarck; Count Maximilian von Bismarck-Schönhausen; Countess Gunilla von Bismarck-Schönhausen; Count Leopold von Bismarck-Schönhausen
- Father: Ivar Tengbom
- Mother: Hjördis Nordin

Styles of The Princess of Bismarck
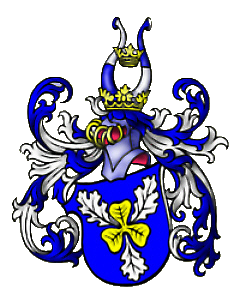
- Reference style: Her Serene Highness
- Spoken style: Your Serene Highness

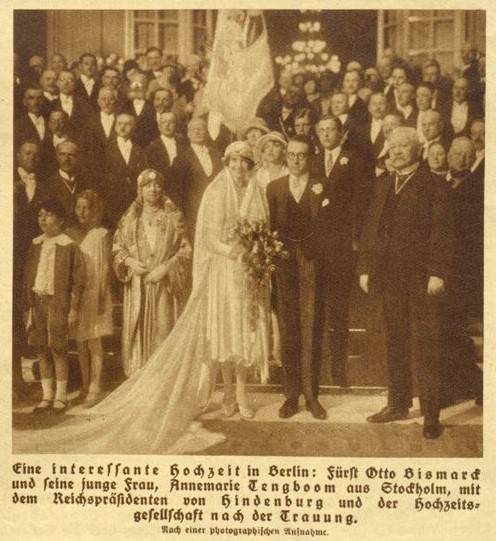
wedding group photo

Ann-Mari, Princess of Bismarck (née Tengbom; 26 July 1907 – 22 September 1999) was a Swedish socialite and the wife of Otto Christian Archibald, Prince of Bismarck.

== Biography ==
Ann-Mari Tengbom was born on 26 July 1907 in Stockholm. She was the daughter of Swedish architect Ivar Tengbom and his first wife, Hjördis Nordin (1877-1969). She attended school in Stockholm, where she was a classmate of Folke Bernadotte, Count of Wisborg.

On 18 April 1928 she married German politician and diplomat Otto Christian Archibald, Prince of Bismarck, Head of the House of Bismarck, in a Lutheran ceremony at the Berlin Cathedral. They had six children:

- Countess Mari Ann (1929–1981).
- Ferdinand, Prince of Bismarck (1930–2019)
- Count Carl Alexander (1935–1992).
- Count Maximilian Viktor (born 1947).
- Countess Gunilla Margaretha (born 1949).
- Count Eduard Leopold (born 1951).

During the war, she and her husband moved into a villa in Rome, where she was known to have thrown parties for members of Italian and German high society. While her husband was a diplomat in Rome, the Princess told Filippo Anfuso, head of the Cabinet of Count Gian Galeazzo Ciano, "that Germany is lost, that Hitler has ruined the country and its people."

She died on 22 September 1999 in Marbella, Spain.
