= Duke of Lauenburg =

Ruler of the Duchy of Saxe-Lauenburg

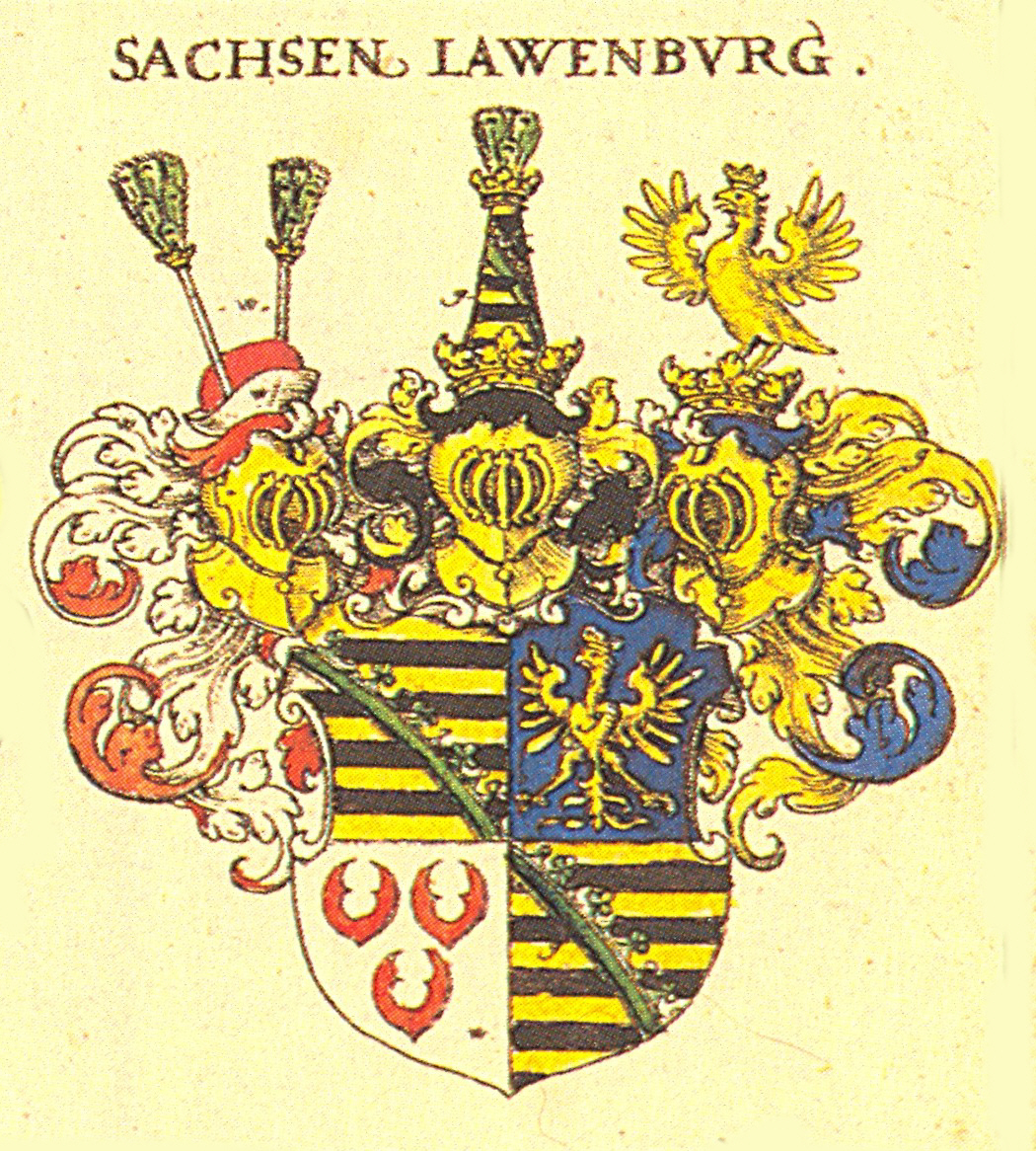
The coat of arms as used in 1605, quartered, with quarter 1 and 4 showing the Ascanian barry of ten, in or and sable, covered by a crancelin of rhombs (they are not shown in this undetailed copy) bendwise in vert (the crancelin symbolises the Saxon ducal crown), quarter 2 in azure, showing an eagle crowned in or (Palgraviate of Saxony), and quarter 3 in argent, showing three water-lily leaves in gules, representing the County of Brehna.

The title of Duke of Lauenburg derives from the Duchy of Saxe-Lauenburg, which, since its foundation in 1269, was ruled in succession by 29 dukes from six dynastic houses and lines, and by an additional four dukes from a temporary dynastic branch line (Anna Maria Franziska of Saxe-Lauenburg, the first would-be duchess regnant, was kept from inheriting the duchy by male rulers of neighbouring states).

The duchy was held by various countries, including France from 1803 to 1805 and from 1810 to 1814, Prussia from 1805 to 1806, and Westphalia from 1806 to 1810. The kings of Denmark, members of the House of Oldenburg, held the Duchy of Lauenburg from 1815 to 1864, when the territory came under Prussian control as a result of the Second Schleswig War, though it was not immediately annexed to Prussia.

In 1865, the estates of Saxe-Lauenburg offered rule of the duchy to King William I of Prussia. He accepted during the same year, ruling it in personal union until the estates decided upon the merger of their state with Prussia as of July 1, 1876.

After the death in 1888 of the last ruling duke, Wilhelm I (who after 1870 was also German emperor), the now purely honorific title of Duke of Lauenburg was granted to Otto von Bismarck after his dismissal as Chancellor of Germany in 1890.

== See also ==
- For a list of the dukes, see the list of Saxon rulers
- For the duchesses consort, see the list of Saxon consorts
