= Warcino =

- Village
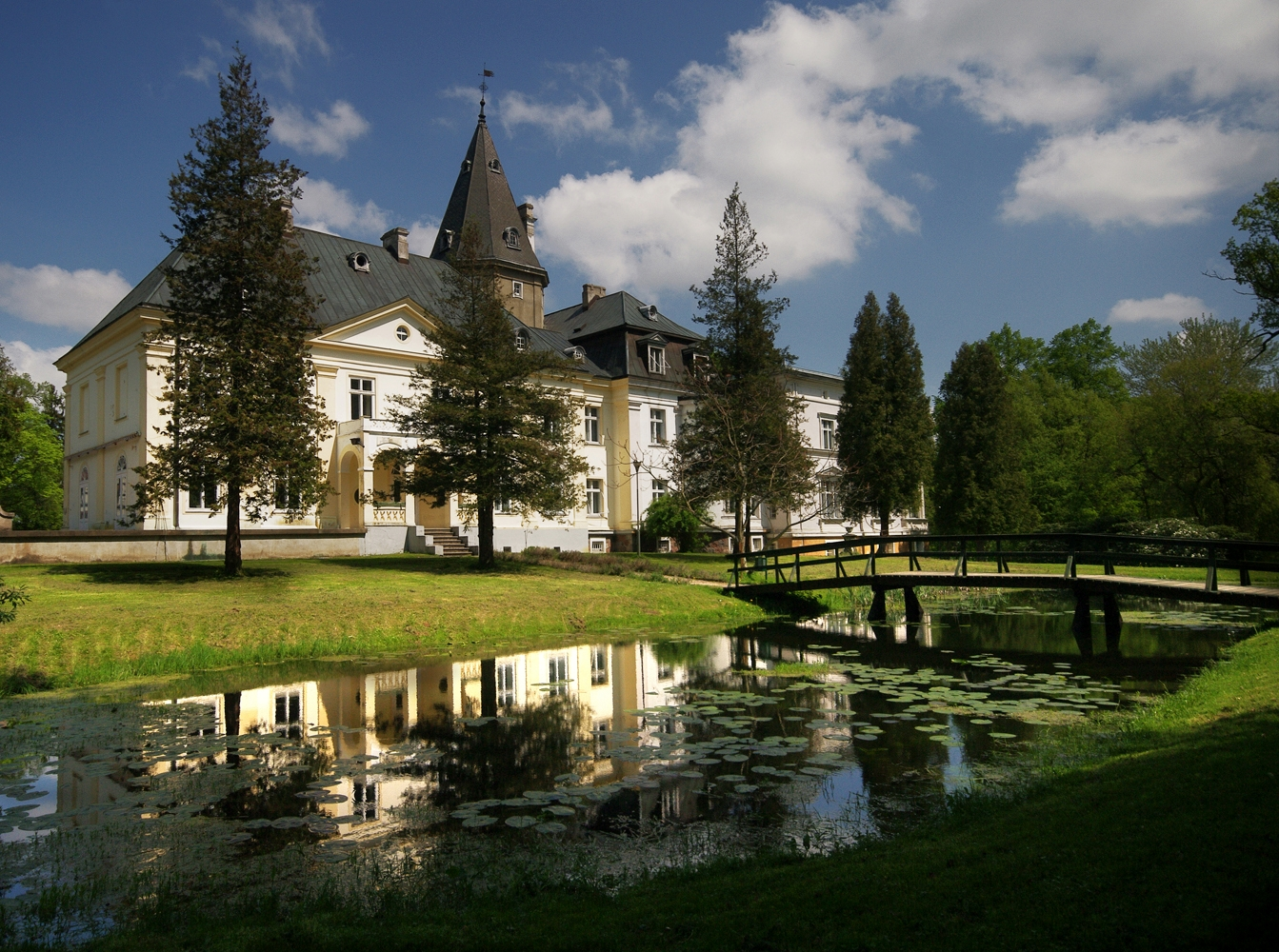
- Warcino Manor (2010)

- Location within Poland
- Coordinates: 54°13′22″N 16°51′26″E
- Country: Poland
- Voivodeship: Pomeranian
- County: Słupsk
- Gmina: Kępice
- Population: 450

Warcino [varˈt͡ɕinɔ] (German: Varzin) is a village in the administrative district of Gmina Kępice, within Słupsk County, Pomeranian Voivodeship, in northern Poland.

== Geography ==
The settlement lies in Farther Pomerania on the left bank of the Wieprza river, approximately 3 km (2 mi) southwest of Kępice, 30 km (19 mi) southwest of Słupsk, and 117 km (73 mi) west of the regional capital Gdańsk.

== History ==
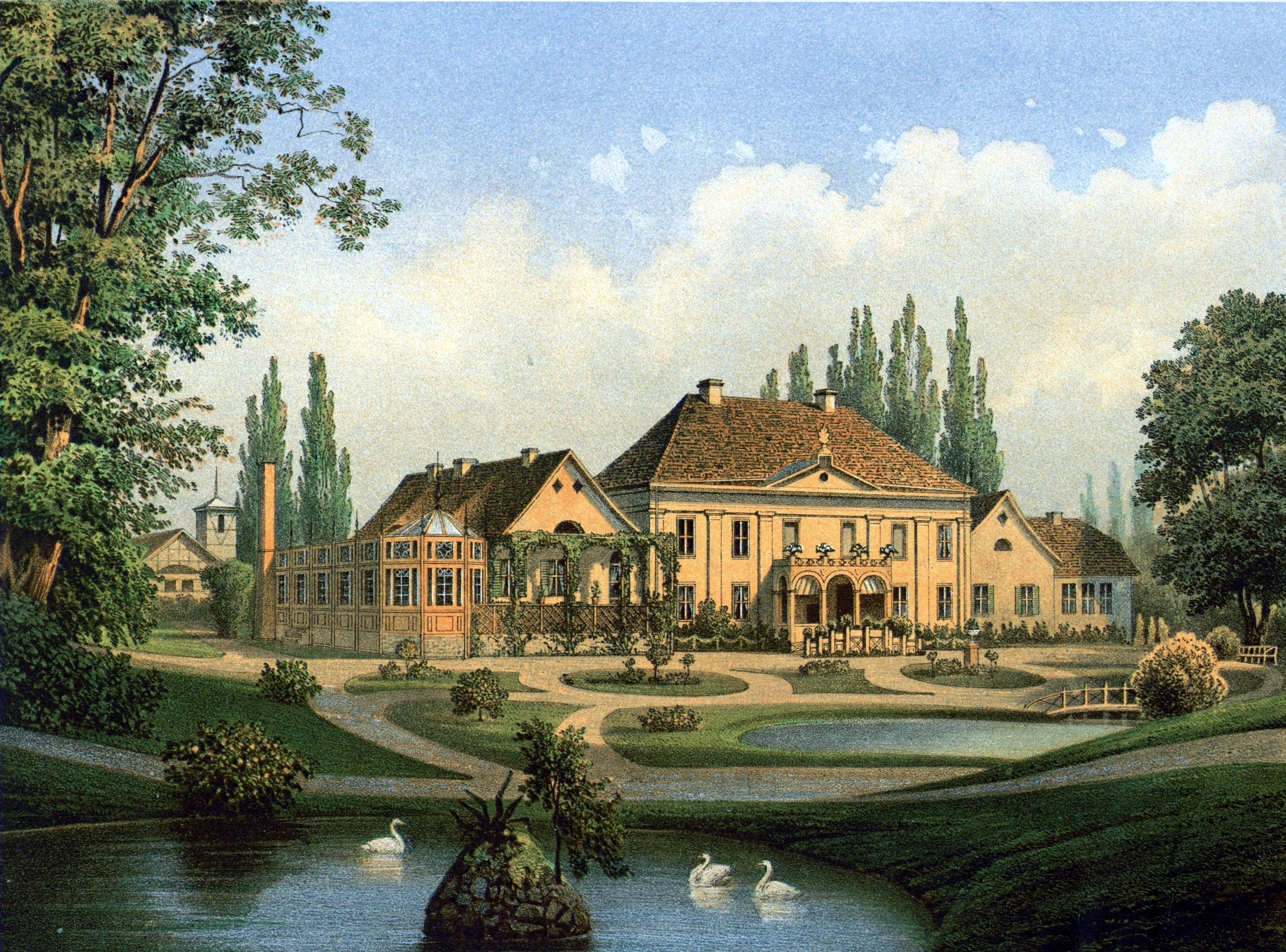
Varzin estate, Alexander Duncker collection (late 19th century)

The settlement, first mentioned in a 1485 deed, when it was part of the Duchy of Pomerania ruled by the Griffin duke Bogislaw X (1454-1523). The estates were held by nobles from nearby Zitzewitz (now Sycewice, Poland). Devastated in the Thirty Years' War, the region was incorporated into the Brandenburg-Prussian province of Pomerania in 1653. The Varzin branch of the Zitzewitz noble family became extinct in 1781, whereafter the estates changed hands several times.

In 1867 it was bought from the Blumenthal family for Otto von Bismarck by the grateful Prussian state for his services as Minister President during the Austro-Prussian War. Bismarck, though born in the Altmark region of central Germany, had ties to eastern Pomerania as he had spent several years of his childhood at his family's estates in Kniephof (now Konarzewo) near Naugard, and married Johanna von Puttkamer (of the Pomeranian Puttkamer noble family) at nearby Kolziglow in 1847. Bismarck evidently enjoyed the lifestyle of a Prussian Junker and the manor with its extended park and forests became one of the couple's favoured residences. Johanna died staying at Varzin in 1894, preceding her husband by four years. Otto von Bismarck then retired to his Friedrichsruh manor in Lauenburg.

Varzin manor remained in the possession of the Bismarck family until the end of World War II. The last family resident, Countess Sybille von Bismarck (née von Arnim), widow of Otto von Bismarck's son Wilhelm, declined to flee and, at age 81, committed suicide when Red Army forces were approaching in March 1945. She was buried in a family mausoleum on the grounds, which however was destroyed in 1957. After the war, the remaining German residents of the area were forcibly expelled and the locale became the Polish Warcino. The manor house, converted into a forestry college, retained a huge depiction of Bismarck's horse, Schmetterling, on its walls.

In 2011–2012, the remains of the ruinous Protestant half-timbered church in nearby Ciecholub were saved and relocated to the Warcino park. The rebuilt church was consecrated by the Evangelical bishop Marcin Hintz on 17 August 2012.

== Notable people ==
- Theodor Fontane visited Varzin, which is mentioned in his novel Effi Briest
- Count Gustav Kálnoky, Foreign Minister of Austria-Hungary, arrived in Varzin in 1884 for conversations on Triple Alliance matters with Chancellor Bismarck
- Walter Flex, author of the Wild Geese poem, stayed at Varzin as a tutor of the Bismarck family in 1910-11
- Marion Dönhoff rested at Varzin during her equestrian flight from East Prussia in 1945 and spent several days there with Sybille von Bismarck.
- Johanna von Puttkamer
