= Kępka railway station =

Railway station in Kępice, Poland

Kępka
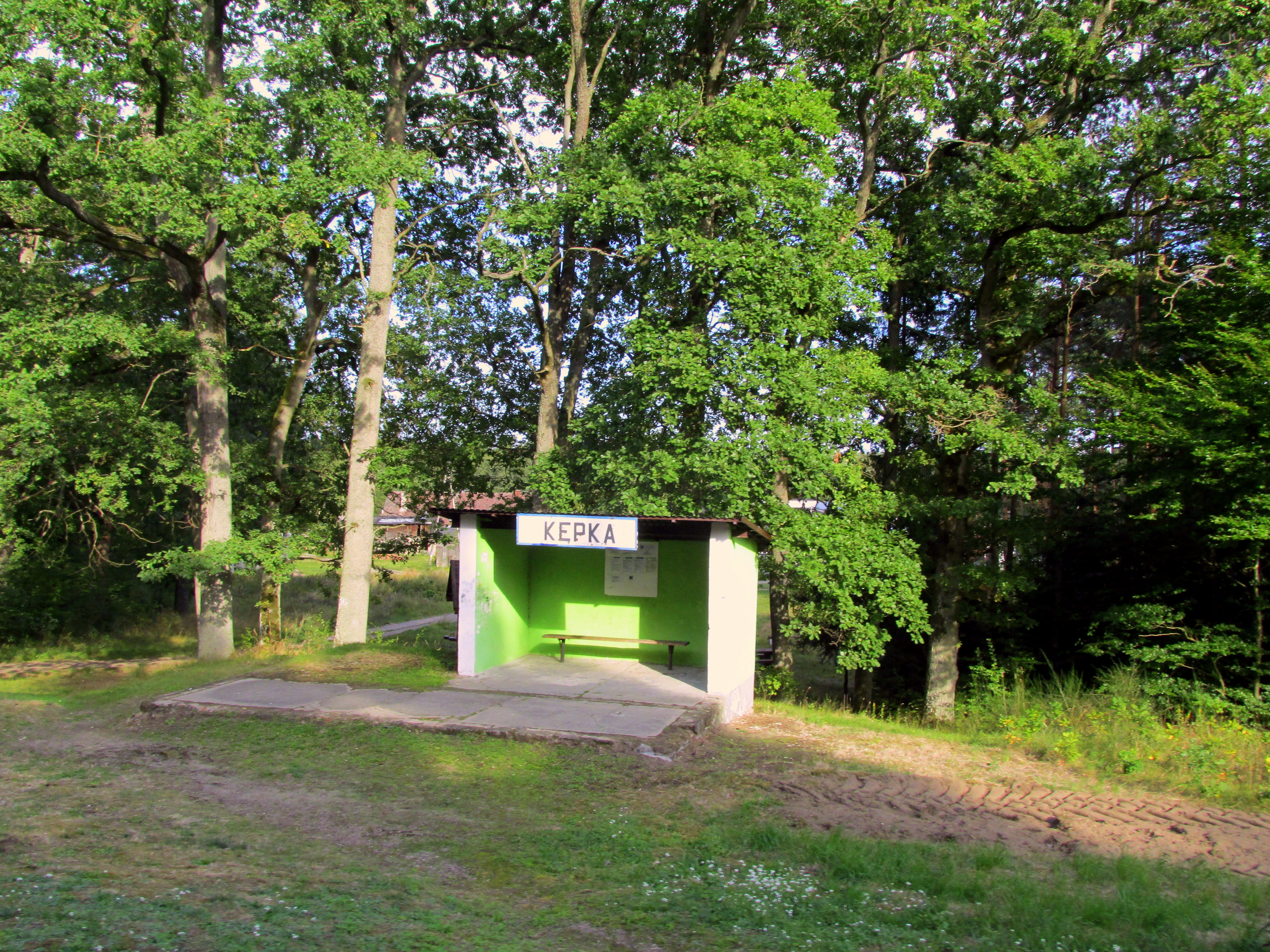
- Station

General information
- Location: Kępice; Poland
- Coordinates: 54.216071°N 16.897484°E
- Owner: Polskie Koleje Państwowe S.A.
- Line: 405: Piła Główna - Ustka Uroczysko

Services
Preceding station	Polregio	Following station
Biesowice towards Miastko, Szczecinek or Chojnice	PR	Kępice towards Słupsk
Location

Kępka is a PKP railway station in Kępice (Pomeranian Voivodeship), Poland.

== Lines crossing the station ==
Start station	End station	Line type
Piła	Ustka	Passenger/Freight

== Train services ==
The station is served by the following services:

- Regional services (R) Słupsk — Miastko
- Regional services (R) Słupsk — Miastko — Szczecinek
- Regional services (R) Słupsk — Miastko — Szczecinek — Chojnice
