= Przytocko railway station =

Railway station in Przytocko, Poland

Przytocko
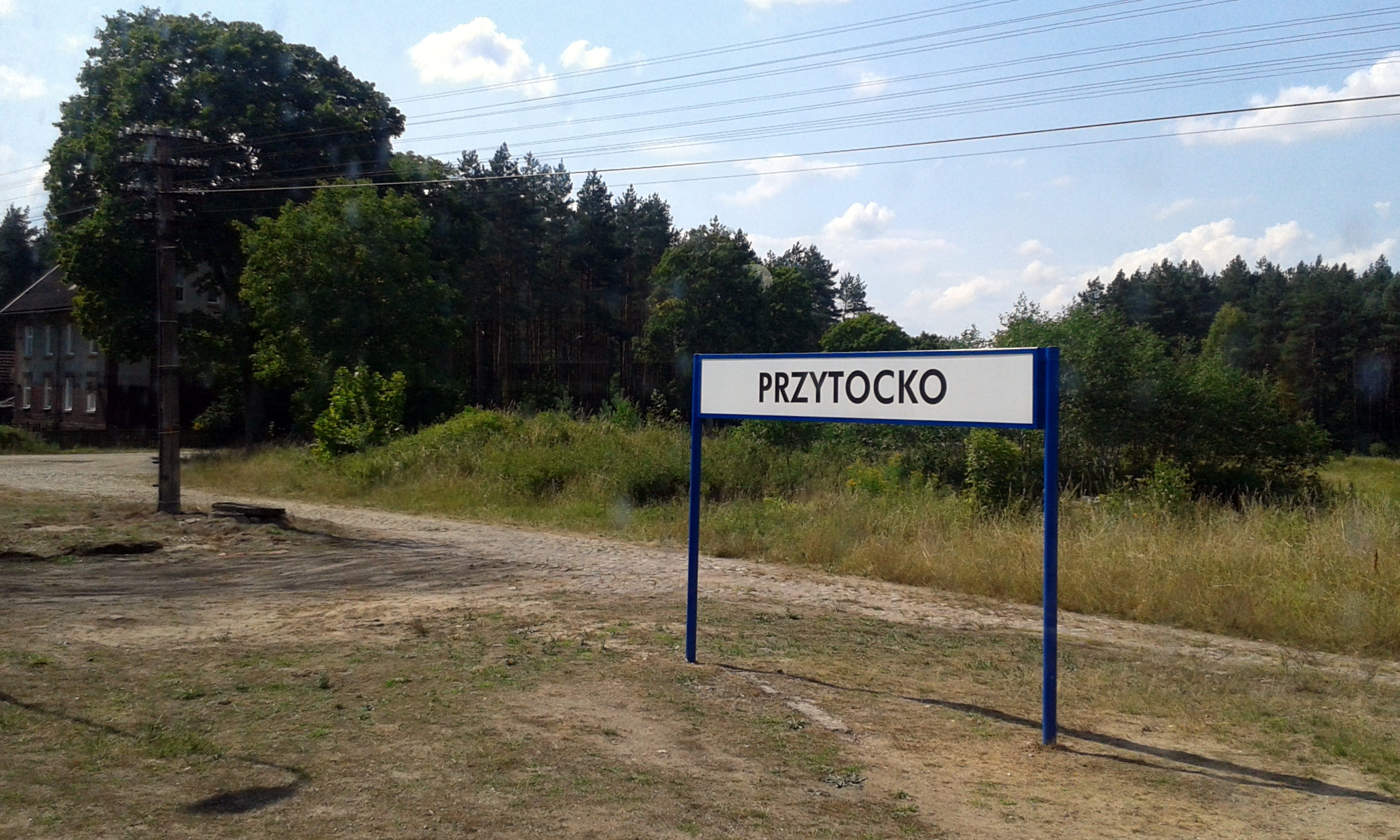
- Signboard of the village Przytocko

General information
- Location: Przytocko; Poland
- Coordinates: 54.123244°N 16.857494°E
- Owner: Polskie Koleje Państwowe S.A.
- Line: 405: Piła Główna - Ustka Uroczysko
- Platforms: 1

Construction
- Structure type: Building: Yes (no longer used); Depot: Never existed Water tower: Never existed

History
- Former names: Pritzig

Services
Preceding station	Polregio	Following station
Kawcze towards Miastko, Szczecinek or Chojnice	PR	Ciecholub towards Słupsk
Location

Przytocko is a PKP railway station in Przytocko (Pomeranian Voivodeship), Poland.

== Lines crossing the station ==
Start station	End station	Line type
Piła	Ustka	Passenger/Freight

== Train services ==
The station is served by the following services:

- Regional services (R) Słupsk — Miastko
- Regional services (R) Słupsk — Miastko — Szczecinek
- Regional services (R) Słupsk — Miastko — Szczecinek — Chojnice
