= Korzybie, Pomeranian Voivodeship =

Korzybie
- Village
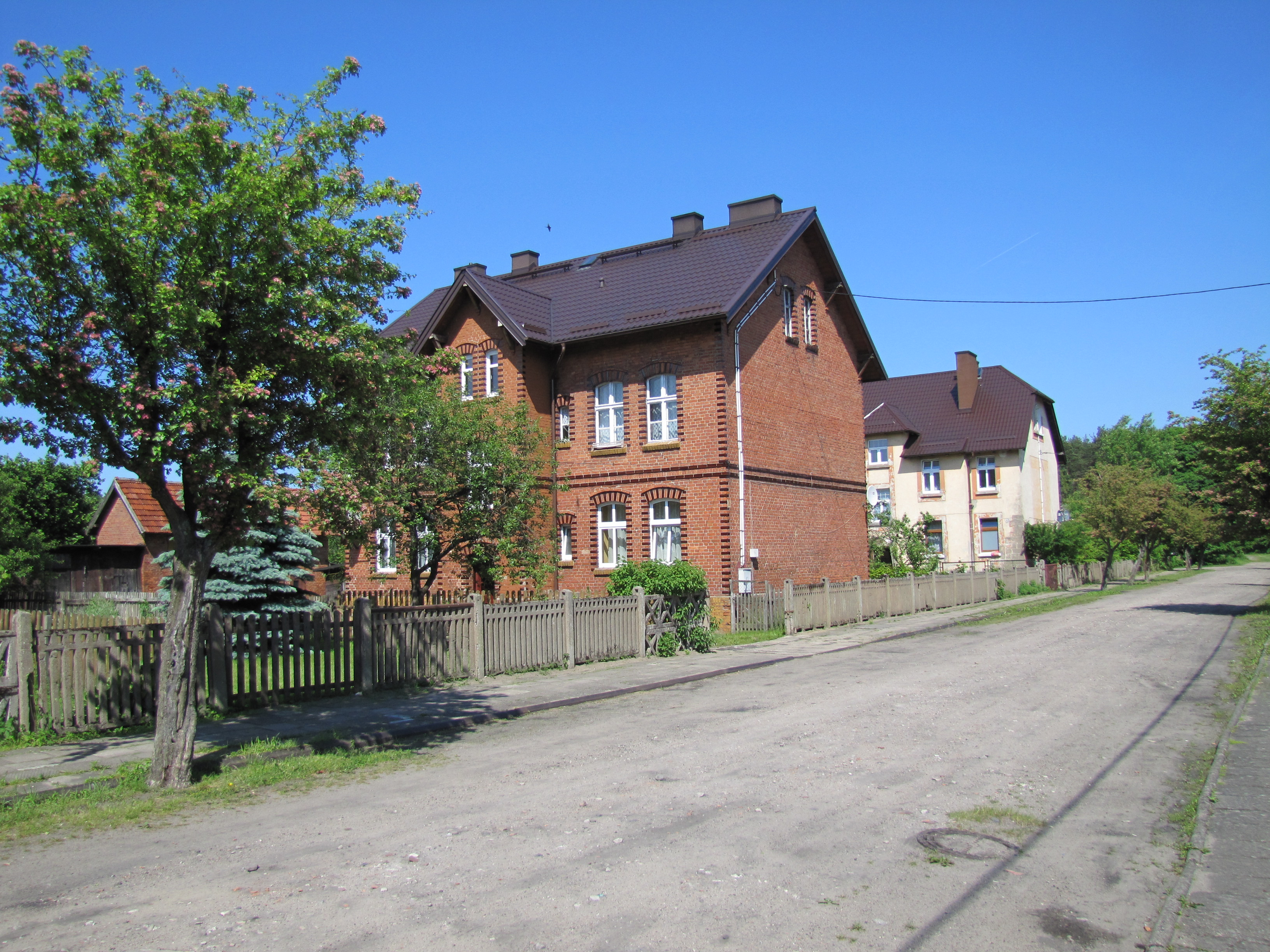
- Korzybie in 2013

- Location within Poland
- Coordinates: 54°18′4″N 16°52′37″E
- Country: Poland
- Voivodeship: Pomeranian
- County: Słupsk
- Gmina: Kępice
- Population: 919

Korzybie ([kɔˈʐɨbjɛ]; German: Zollbrück) is a village in the administrative district of Gmina Kępice, within Słupsk County, Pomeranian Voivodeship, in northern Poland.

For the history of the region, see History of Pomerania.

Former chairman of the German Party of Democratic Socialism, Lothar Bisky, was born here in 1941.

== Geography ==
The village is located in Farther Pomerania, about 14 kilometres (8.7 mi) southeast of Sławno and 24 kilometres (15 mi) southwest of Słupsk, in the proglacial valley of the Wieprza.

The Voivodeship road 209 leads to the village, connecting Sławno (National Road 6) with Suchorze (National Road 21) and Bytów (National Road 20).

== History ==
Zollbrück was established before 1871 as a Vorwerk belonging to Barvin (now Barwino). After 1871, the Zollbrück railway station was built on the Schneidemühl–Neustettin–Stolp railway line. Until 1928, Zollbrück, together with the Zollbrück Vorwerk and Zollbrück railway station, was part of the municipality of Barvin. In 1928, following the abolition of manorial districts and the reorganization of municipalities, the independent rural municipality of Zollbrück was established. The settlements of Barviner Mühle, Frankenfelde, Löschinghof and Ulrichstal were also incorporated into the municipality.

In 1933, Zollbrück had 880 inhabitants. The population increased to 910 by 1939.

Until 1945, Zollbrück was a municipality in the Rummelsburg District in the Province of Pomerania, Köslin administrative region, in Prussia and the German Empire.

Towards the end of World War II, the Red Army occupied the region in the spring of 1945. Shortly afterward, Zollbrück, along with the rest of Farther Pomerania, was placed under Polish administration by the Soviet Union in accordance with the Potsdam Agreement. Polish civilians subsequently began settling in Zollbrück. The village was renamed Korzybie, and the German inhabitants were subsequently expelled.

Korzybie is now a village district of the Gmina Kępice in Słupsk County, Pomeranian Voivodeship. From 1975 to 1998, it was part of the former Słupsk Voivodeship. In 2006, the village had 919 inhabitants.

== Church ==
Before 1945, the population of Zollbrück was almost entirely Protestant. The village belonged to the parish of Bartin (now Barcino) in the church district of Schlawe, part of the Pomeranian ecclesiastical province of the Evangelical Church of the old-Prussian Union.

After 1945, Korzybie remained affiliated with Barcino. The population subsequently became predominantly Roman Catholic. A church dedicated to Our Lady of Częstochowa was built in Korzybie. It is a filial church of the parish in Barcino, which belongs to the Deanery of Polanów in the Diocese of Koszalin-Kołobrzeg of the Catholic Church in Poland.

== Education ==
Until 1895, children from Zollbrück attended school in Barvin. By 1892, the number of pupils had increased to 43, creating the need for a separate school building. Construction of a school began in 1896. In 1937, three teachers taught 167 children there. A new school building was constructed in 1928–1929.
