= Biesowice railway station =

Railway station in Biesowice, Poland

Coordinates: 54°11′35″N 16°53′20″E

Biesowice
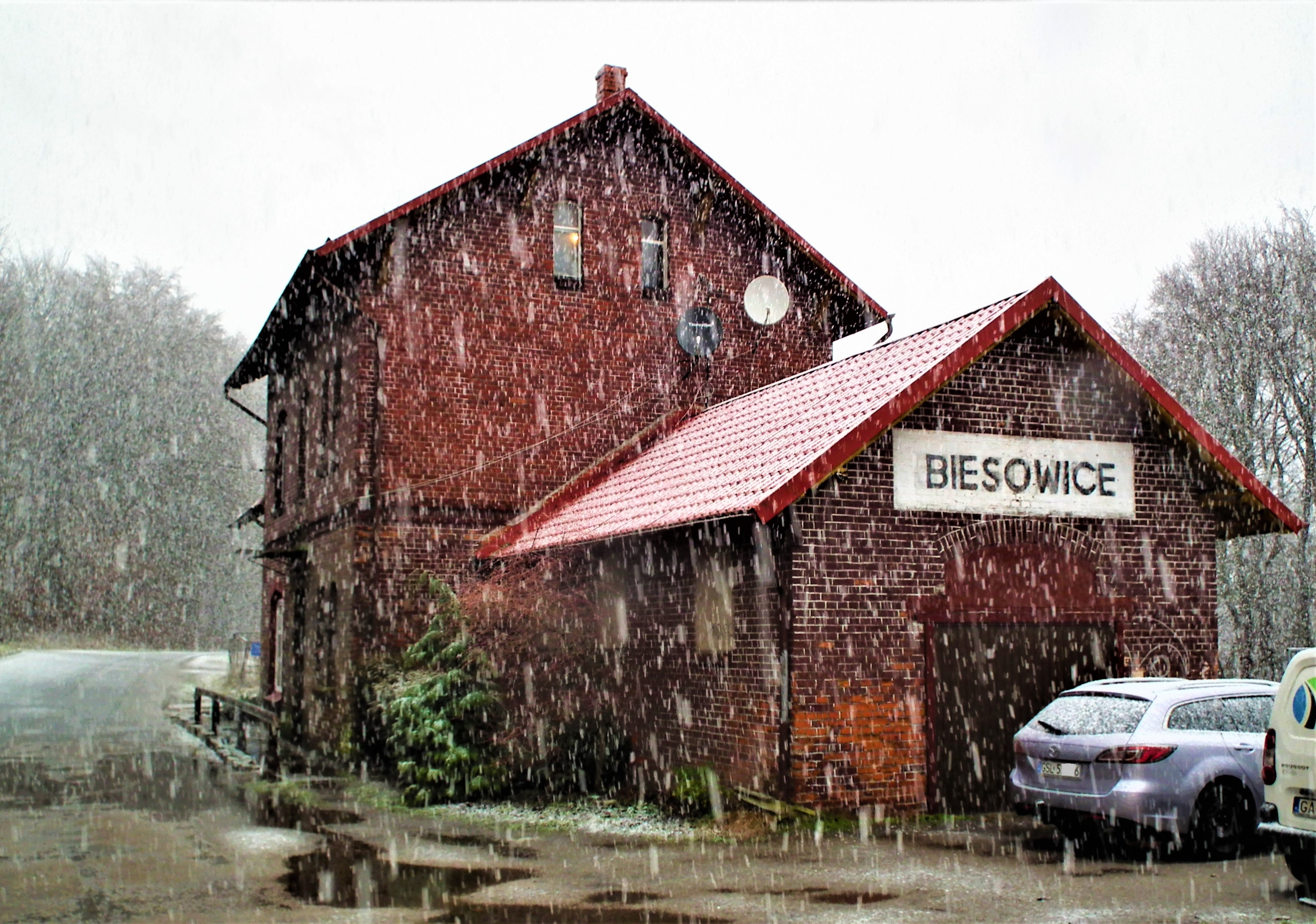

General information
- Location: Biesowice, Pomeranian Voivodeship; Poland
- Owner: Polish State Railways
- Line: Piła Główna–Ustka Uroczysko

History
- Former names: Beßwitz

Services
Preceding station	Polregio	Following station
Ciecholub towards Miastko, Szczecinek or Chojnice	PR	Kępka towards Słupsk
Location

Biesowice is a railway station in Biesowice, Słupsk County within the Pomeranian Voivodeship in northern Poland.

== Lines ==
Start station	End station	Traffic
Piła	Ustka	Passenger/Freight

== Train services ==
The station is served by the following services:

- Regional services (PR) Słupsk - Miastko
- Regional services (PR) Słupsk - Miastko - Szczecinek
- Regional services (PR) Słupsk - Miastko - Szczecinek - Chojnice
