= Ciecholub railway station =

Railway station in Pomeranian Voivodeship, Poland

Coordinates: 54°10′22″N 16°53′17″E

Ciecholub
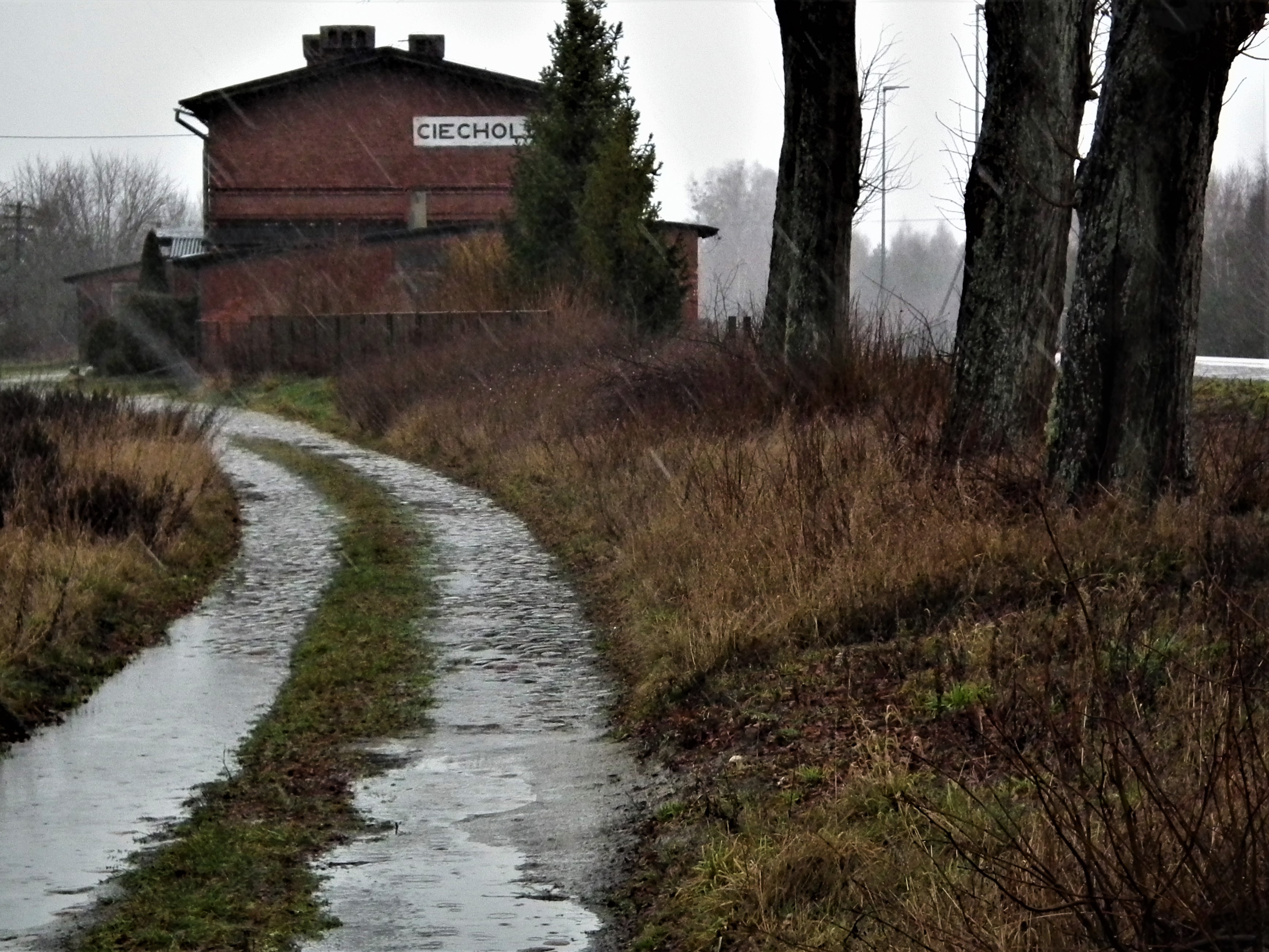

General information
- Location: Ciecholub; Poland
- Owner: Polskie Koleje Państwowe S.A.
- Line: 405: Piła Główna - Ustka Uroczysko

History
- Former names: Techlipp

Services
Preceding station	Polregio	Following station
Przytocko towards Miastko, Szczecinek or Chojnice	PR	Biesowice towards Słupsk
Location

Ciecholub is a PKP railway station in Ciecholub (Pomeranian Voivodeship), Poland.

== Lines crossing the station ==
Start station	End station	Line type
Piła	Ustka	Passenger/Freight

== Train services ==
The station is served by the following services:

- Regional services (R) Słupsk — Miastko
- Regional services (R) Słupsk — Miastko — Szczecinek
- Regional services (R) Słupsk — Miastko — Szczecinek — Chojnice
