= Zielin Miastecki railway station =

Railway station in Pomeranian Voivodeship, Poland

Zielin Miastecki
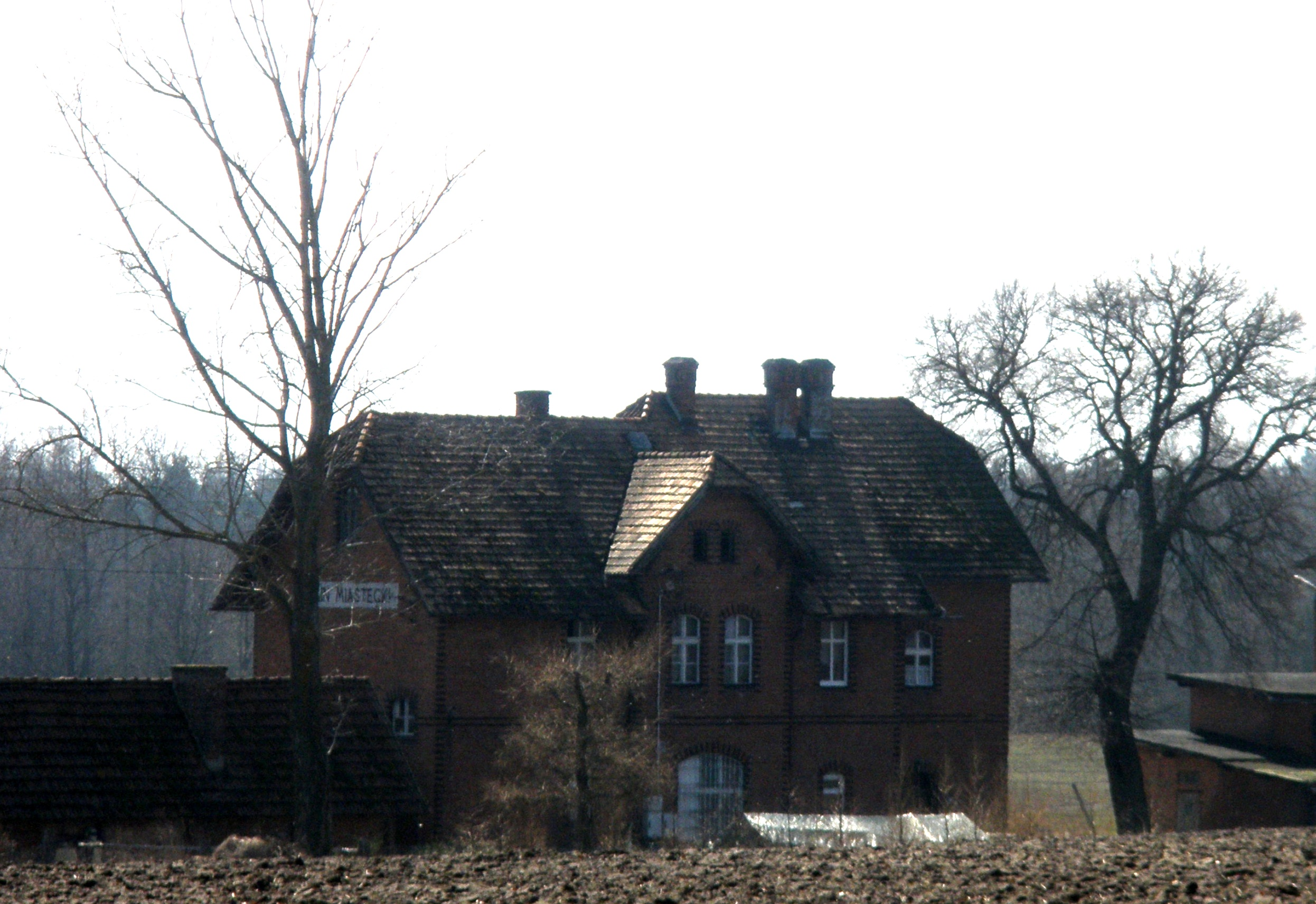

General information
- Location: Zielin Miastecki; Poland
- Coordinates: 54.239667°N 17.100583°E
- Owner: Polskie Koleje Państwowe S.A.

Construction
- Structure type: Building: Yes (no longer used); Depot: Never existed Water tower: Yes (no longer used)

History
- Former names: Sellin (Bz. Köslin) until 1945
Location

Zielin Miastecki is a non-operational PKP railway station in Zielin Miastecki (Pomeranian Voivodeship), Poland.

== Lines crossing the station ==
Start station	End station	Line type
Lipusz	Korzybie	Closed
