= Osieki =

Osieki may refer to the following places:

- Osieki, Bytów County in Pomeranian Voivodeship (north Poland)
- Osieki, Słupsk County in Pomeranian Voivodeship (north Poland)
- Osieki, Warmian-Masurian Voivodeship (north Poland)
- Osieki, West Pomeranian Voivodeship (north-west Poland)
