= Kawcze railway station =

Railway station in Pomeranian Voivodeship, Poland

Kawcze

General information
- Location: Kawcze; Poland
- Coordinates: 54.072487°N 16.882590°E
- Owner: Polskie Koleje Państwowe S.A.
- Line: 405: Piła Główna - Ustka Uroczysko
- Platforms: 1

Construction
- Structure type: Building: Yes; Depot: No; Water tower: No

History
- Former names: Kaffzig

Services
Preceding station	Polregio	Following station
Miastko towards Miastko, Szczecinek or Chojnice	PR	Przytocko towards Słupsk
Location

Kawcze is a PKP railway station in Kawcze (Pomeranian Voivodeship), Poland.

== Lines crossing the station ==
Start station	End station	Line type
Piła	Ustka	Passenger/Freight

== Train services ==
The station is served by the following services:

- Regional services (R) Słupsk — Miastko
- Regional services (R) Słupsk — Miastko — Szczecinek
- Regional services (R) Słupsk — Miastko — Szczecinek — Chojnice
