= Kuznik =

Kuznik may refer to:

== People with the surname ==
- Greg Kuznik (born 1978), Canadian-born Slovene former ice hockey player
- Jan Tomáš Kuzník (1716–1786), Czech teacher of music, musician, composer, and poet
- Peggy Kuznik (born 1986), German football player

== Places ==
- Kuźnik, Lubusz Voivodeship
- Kuźnik, Pomeranian Voivodeship
