= Przyjezierze =

Przyjezierze may refer to the following places:

- Przyjezierze, Kuyavian-Pomeranian Voivodeship (north-central Poland)
- Przyjezierze, Pomeranian Voivodeship (north Poland)
- Przyjezierze, Gryfino County in West Pomeranian Voivodeship (north-west Poland)
- Przyjezierze, Szczecinek County in West Pomeranian Voivodeship (north-west Poland)
