= Korzybie railway station =

Railway station in Pomeranian Voivodeship, Poland

Korzybie
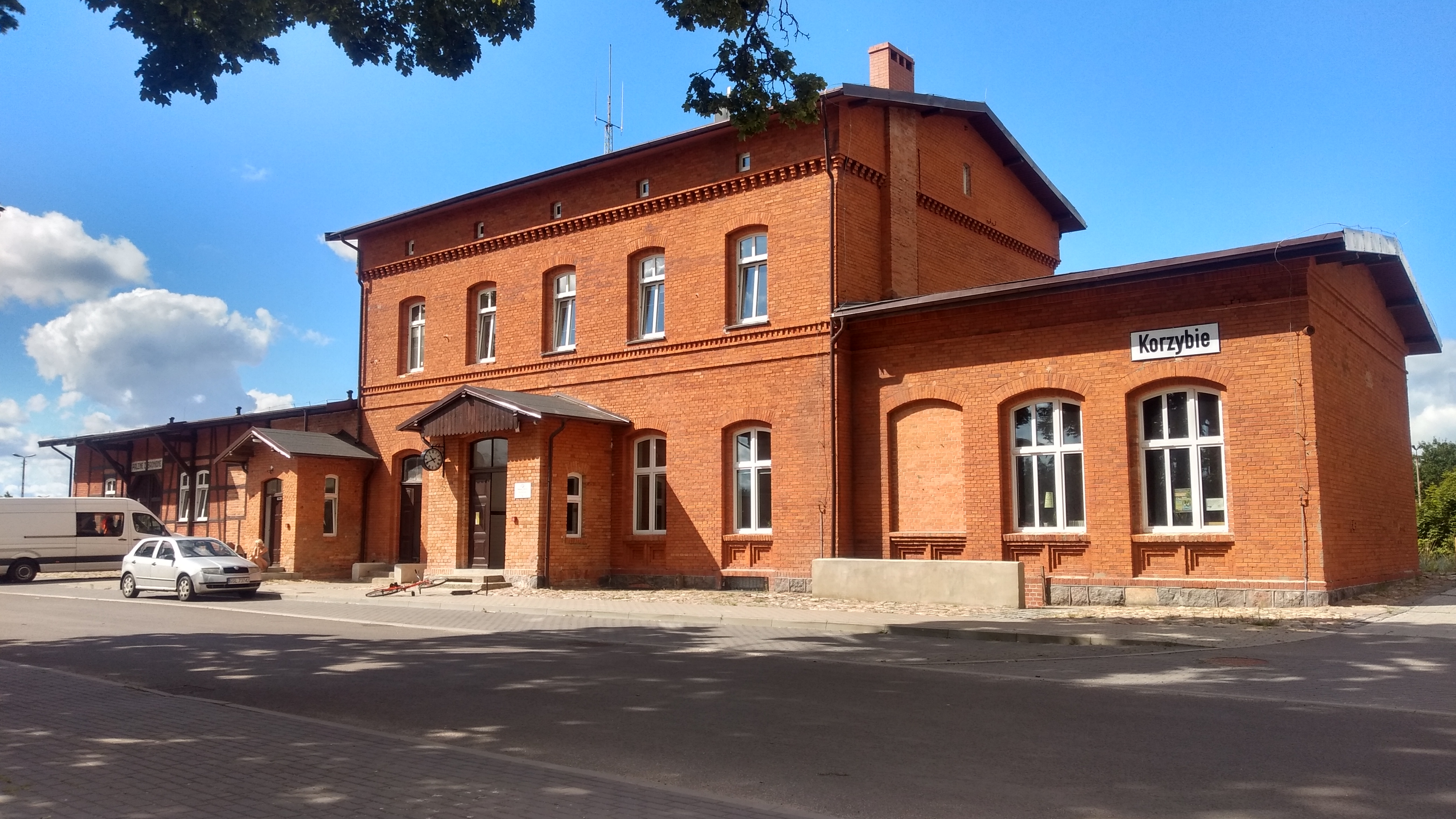

General information
- Location: Korzybie; Poland
- Coordinates: 54°18′N 16°54′E
- Owner: Polskie Koleje Państwowe S.A.
- Line: 212: Lipusz - Korzybie; 405: Piła Główna - Ustka Uroczysko; 418: Korzybie -Darłowo
- Platforms: 1 (2 other disused)
- Tracks: 1 (2 other disused)

Construction
- Structure type: Building: Yes; Depot: No (demolished); Water tower: Yes

History
- Former names: Zollbrück (Pommern)

Services
Preceding station	Polregio	Following station
Kępice towards Miastko, Szczecinek or Chojnice	PR	Wrząca Pomorska towards Słupsk
Location

Korzybie is a PKP railway station, formerly a regional junction station, in Korzybie (Pomeranian Voivodeship), Poland.

== History ==
Historically, the station complex included freight and passenger ticket offices, a telegraph, two signal boxes, a base for security and track-maintenance personnel, an electricians’ workshop, a health clinic, a fire station, a water tower and holiday cottages for railway employees. The upper floor of the station building contained staff accommodation (the station master lived there), while the basement housed a shelter, boiler room and civil-defence stores.

In the 21st century the station building was acquired and renovated by the Gmina Kępice. The premises now house a branch of the Public Library of the Town and Gmina of Kępice, a children’s play area, a training and community room with kitchen facilities, and several guest rooms. The refurbishment was financed by a PLN 1.3 million grant from the National Programme for the Development of Libraries.

== Lines crossing the station ==
Start station	End station	Line type
Piła	Ustka	Passenger/Freight
Korzybie	Darłowo	Dismantled
Grzmiąca	Korzybie	Dismantled
Lipusz	Korzybie	Closed

== Train services ==
The station is served by the following services:

- Regional services (R) Słupsk — Miastko
- Regional services (R) Słupsk — Miastko — Szczecinek
- Regional services (R) Słupsk — Miastko — Szczecinek — Chojnice
