= Barcino =

Barcino may refer to:

- Barcelona, Spain – Barcino in Latin
- Barcino, Poland
  - Barcino (PKP station)
- Barcelonette, Barcino Nova in Latin
- Barcino (cnidarian), a genus of cnidarians in the family Barcinidae
