= Darłówko =

Coordinates: 54°26′N 16°23′E

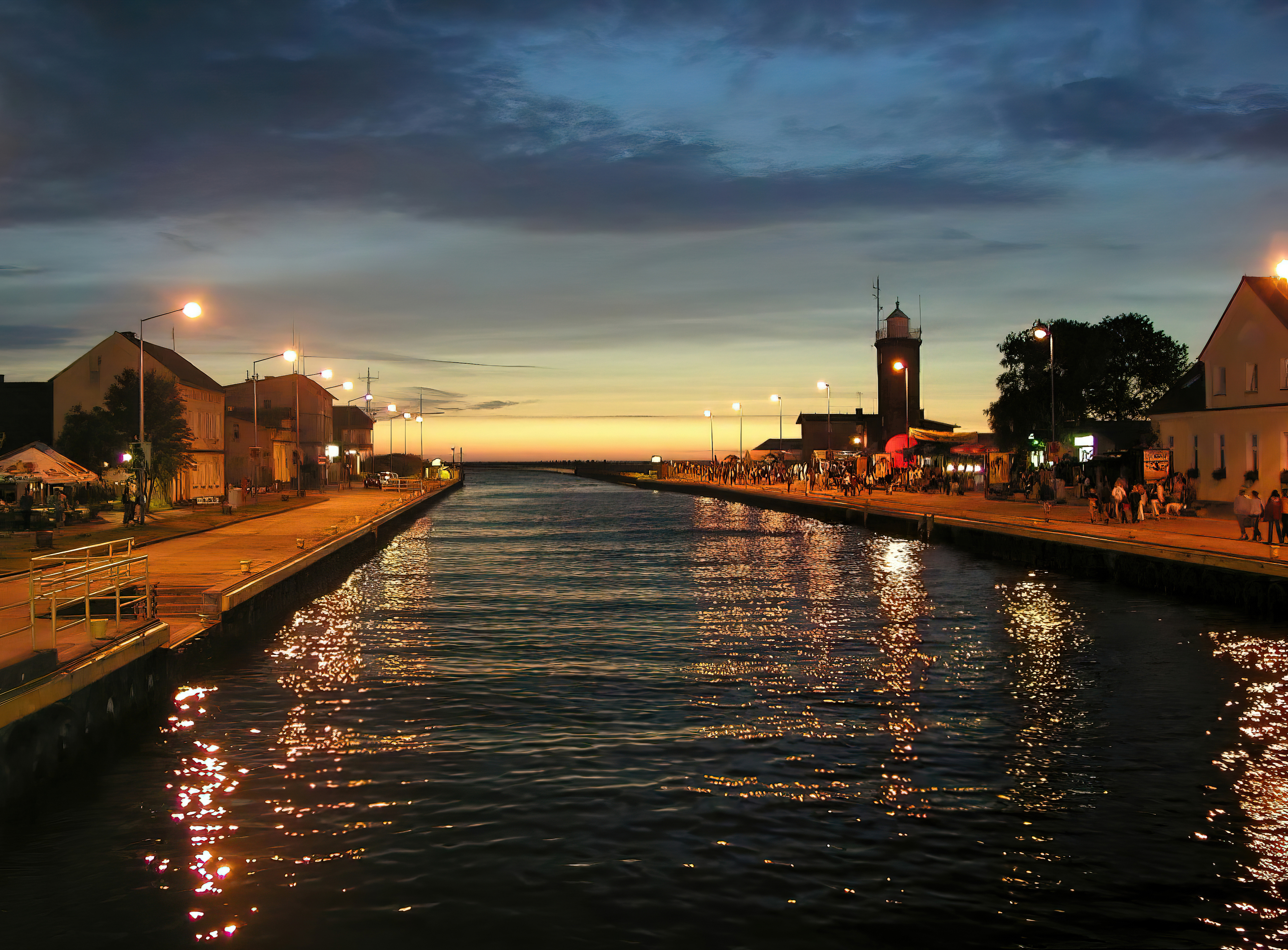
Darłówko, straddling the Wieprza, at night.

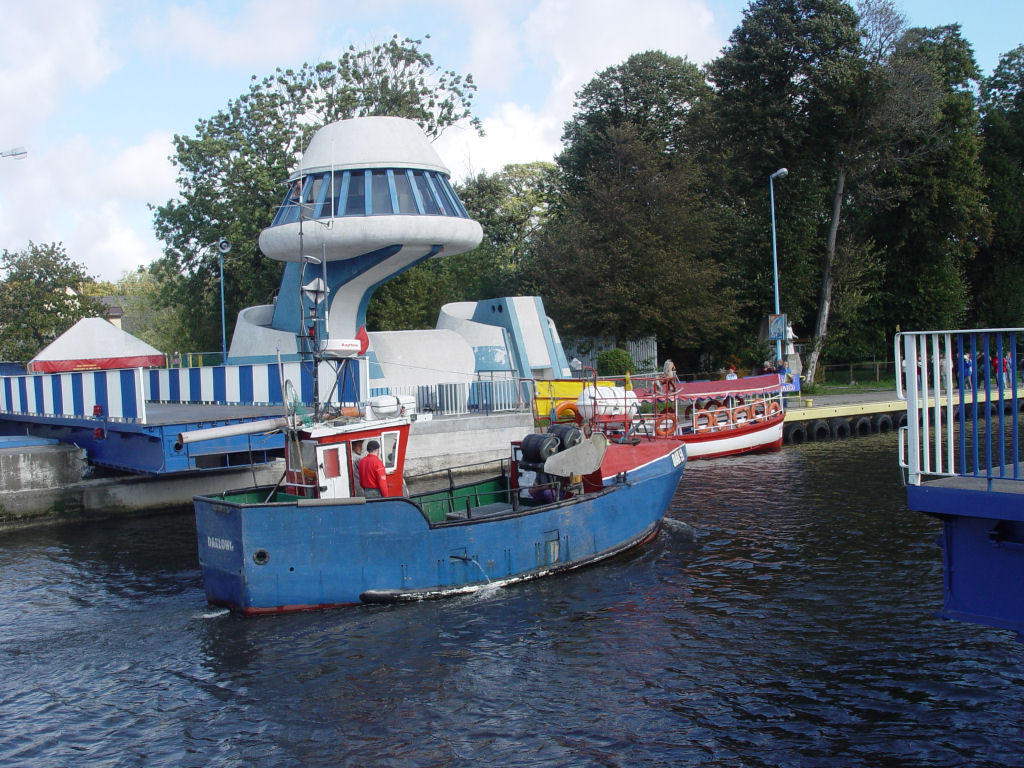
Retractable bridge

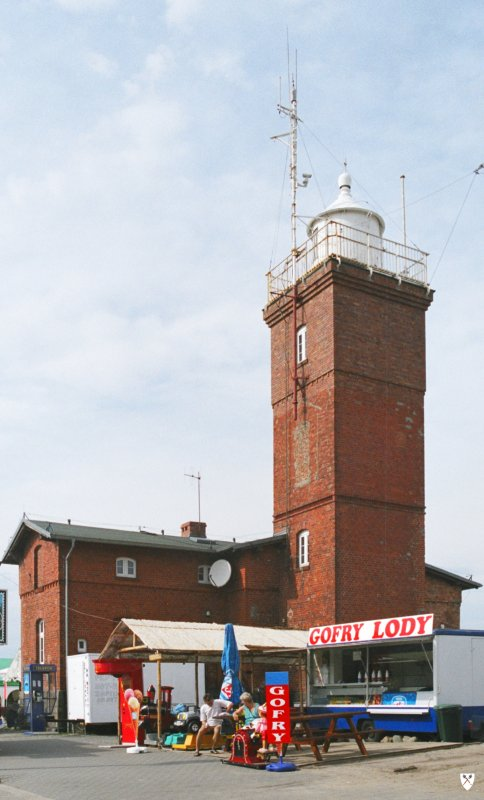
The lighthouse

Darłówko (German: Rügenwaldermünde) is a seaside neighborhood and a popular summertime resort in the town of Darłowo on the southern coast of the Baltic Sea in northern Poland. It is the site of a yearly gathering of old military vehicles, the largest of its kind in Europe, held at the end of Słowiańska street. Darłówko has two beaches, east and west, extending from either side of the Wieprza river mouth.

== Lighthouse ==
Located here is the shortest lighthouse on the Polish seacoast, at 21m in height. It is administered by the marine office in Słupsk.

== Boat to Bornholm ==
Until 29 August each year there is a connection by ship with Nexø on the Danish island of Bornholm. The catamaran "Jantar" carries 288 passengers, and caters mostly to the children from the summer camps nearby and from around the port of Ustka, which does not have a similar connection to Bornholm.

== Water park Jan ==
"Park Wodny Jan" is a water park located at the end of Słowiańska street.

== See also ==
- Darłowo
