= Żelice Dolne =

- Village
- Location within Poland
- Coordinates: 54°13′23″N 16°55′35″E
- Country: Poland
- Voivodeship: Pomeranian
- County: Słupsk
- Gmina: Kępice
- Population: 58

Żelice Dolne [ʐɛˈlit͡sɛ ˈdɔlnɛ] is a village in the administrative district of Gmina Kępice, within Słupsk County, Pomeranian Voivodeship, in northern Poland.

For the history of the region, see History of Pomerania.
