= Węgorzyno, Pomeranian Voivodeship =

Węgorzyno
- Village
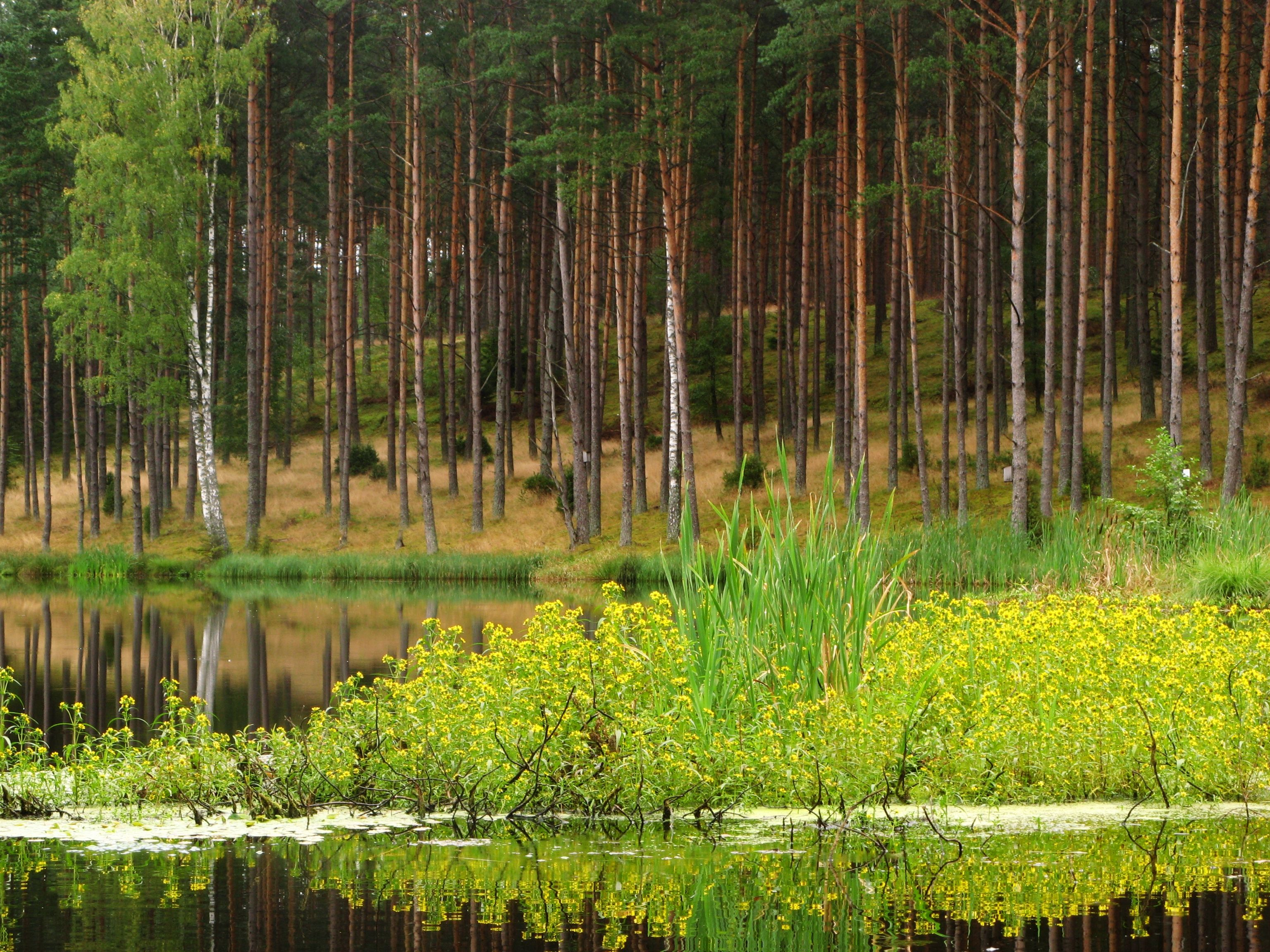

- Location within Poland
- Coordinates: 54°8′39″N 16°53′54″E
- Country: Poland
- Voivodeship: Pomeranian
- County: Słupsk
- Gmina: Kępice
- Population: 44
- Time zone: UTC+1 (CET)
  - Summer (DST): UTC+2 (CEST)
- Vehicle registration: GSL

Węgorzyno [vɛŋɡɔˈʐɨnɔ] (German: Vangerin) is a village in the administrative district of Gmina Kępice, within Słupsk County, Pomeranian Voivodeship, in northern Poland.
