= Podgóry-Kolonia =

- Settlement
- Location within Poland
- Coordinates: 54°11′37″N 16°45′10″E
- Country: Poland
- Voivodeship: Pomeranian
- County: Słupsk
- Gmina: Kępice

Podgóry-Kolonia [pɔdˈɡurɨ kɔˈlɔɲa] is a settlement in the administrative district of Gmina Kępice, within Słupsk County, Pomeranian Voivodeship, in northern Poland.

For the history of the region, see History of Pomerania.
