= Lipnik, Pomeranian Voivodeship =

Lipnik
- Settlement
- Location within Poland
- Coordinates: 54°11′57″N 16°57′26″E
- Country: Poland
- Voivodeship: Pomeranian
- County: Słupsk
- Gmina: Kępice

Lipnik (Polish pronunciation: [ˈlipɲik]) is a settlement in the administrative district of Gmina Kępice, within Słupsk County, Pomeranian Voivodeship, in northern Poland.

For the history of the region, see History of Pomerania.
