= Chorowo =

- Settlement
- Location within Poland
- Coordinates: 54°12′27″N 16°47′0″E
- Country: Poland
- Voivodeship: Pomeranian
- County: Słupsk
- Gmina: Kępice
- Population: 70

Chorowo [xɔˈrɔvɔ] is a settlement in the administrative district of Gmina Kępice, within Słupsk County, Pomeranian Voivodeship, in northern Poland.

For the history of the region, see History of Pomerania.
