= Brzezinka, Słupsk County =

Brzezinka
- Settlement
- Location within Poland
- Coordinates: 54°12′43″N 16°43′56″E
- Country: Poland
- Voivodeship: Pomeranian
- County: Słupsk
- Gmina: Kępice
- Population: 9
- Time zone: UTC+1 (CET)
  - Summer (DST): UTC+2 (CEST)
- Vehicle registration: GSL

Brzezinka (Polish: [bʐɛˈʑiŋka]) is a settlement in the administrative district of Gmina Kępice, within Słupsk County, Pomeranian Voivodeship, in northern Poland. It is located in the historic region of Pomerania.

== History ==
The area became part of the emerging Polish state in the 10th century. Following Poland's fragmentation, it formed part of various splinter duchies, incl. the Duchy of Pomerania. From the 18th century it was part of the Kingdom of Prussia, and from 1871 it was also part of Germany. Following Germany's defeat in World War II in 1945, the area became again part of Poland.
