= Biesowiczki =

- Settlement
- Location within Poland
- Coordinates: 54°10′54″N 16°53′59″E
- Country: Poland
- Voivodeship: Pomeranian
- County: Słupsk
- Gmina: Kępice
- Population: 12

Biesowiczki [bjɛsɔˈvit͡ʂki] (German: Beßwitzer Glashütte) is a settlement in the administrative district of Gmina Kępice, within Słupsk County, Pomeranian Voivodeship, in northern Poland.

== See also ==
- History of Pomerania
