= Lothar Bisky =

German politician (1941–2013)

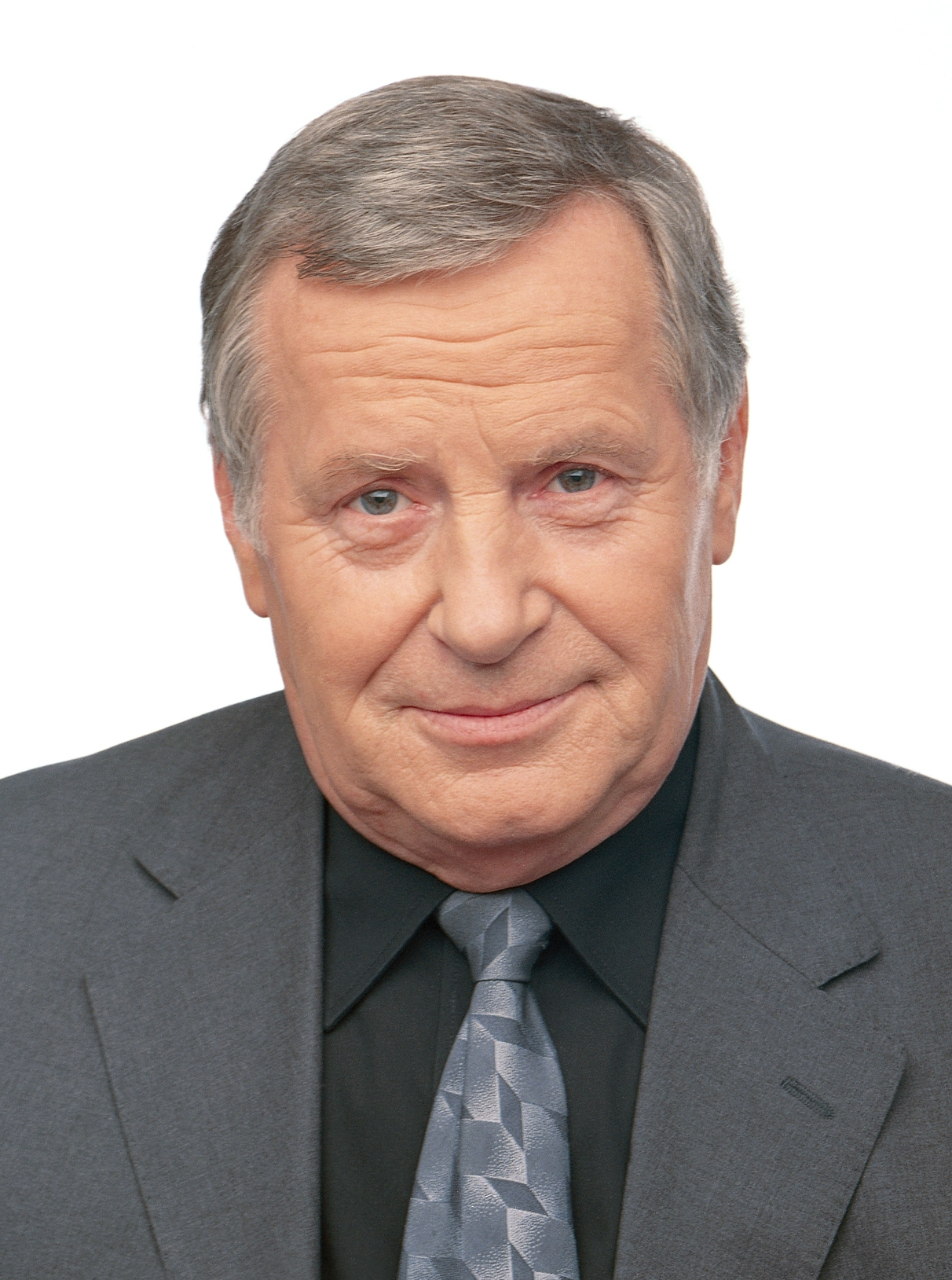
- Official portrait, 2005

Chairman of The Left
- In office 16 June 2007 – 15 May 2010 Serving with Oskar Lafontaine
- Preceded by: himself (as Leader of the Party of Democratic Socialism)
- Succeeded by: Gesine Lötzsch

Chairman of the Party of Democratic Socialism
- In office 29 June 2003 – 15 June 2007
- Preceded by: Gabi Zimmer
- Succeeded by: himself (as co-leader of The Left)
- In office 31 January 1993 – 14 October 2000
- Preceded by: Gregor Gysi
- Succeeded by: Gabi Zimmer

Member of the European Parliament for Germany
- In office 14 July 2009 – 13 August 2013
- Succeeded by: Martina Michels

Member of the Bundestag for Brandenburg
- In office 18 October 2005 – 14 July 2009
- Succeeded by: Steffen Hultsch
- Constituency: The Left Party.PDS List

Vice President of the Landtag of Brandenburg (on proposal of the PDS-group)
- In office 13 October 2004 – 20 October 2005
- Preceded by: Position established
- Succeeded by: Gerlinde Stobrawa

Leader of the PDS in Landtag of Brandenburg
- In office 26 October 1990 – 13 October 2004
- Preceded by: Position established
- Succeeded by: Dagmar Enkelmann

Member of the Landtag of Brandenburg
- In office 26 October 1990 – 20 October 2005
- Preceded by: Constituency established
- Succeeded by: Kerstin Meier
- Constituency: PDS List

Member of the Volkskammer for Potsdam
- In office 5 April 1990 – 2 October 1990
- Preceded by: Constituency established
- Succeeded by: Constituency abolished

Head of the Culture Department of the Central Committee
- In office 14 November 1989 – 3 December 1989
- Secretary: Klaus Höpcke
- Preceded by: Ursula Ragwitz
- Succeeded by: Position abolished

Personal details
- Born: 17 August 1941 Zollbrück, Pomerania, Germany (now Korzybie, Poland)
- Died: 13 August 2013 (aged 71) Leipzig, Germany
- Party: SED (1963–1989); PDS (1989–2007); The Left (2007–2013)
- Website: lothar-bisky.de

Lothar Bisky (17 August 1941 – 13 August 2013) was a German politician. He was the chairman of the Party of Democratic Socialism (PDS), the successor of East Germany's Socialist Unity Party (SED). In June 2007, he became co-chairman of The Left (Die Linke) party, formed by a merger of the PDS and the much smaller Labour and Social Justice – The Electoral Alternative. From 2007 until 2010, he was the President of the Party of the European Left. Also, he was the Publisher of the socialist newspaper Neues Deutschland.

== Background ==
Bisky was born in Zollbrück, Pomerania, Germany (now Korzybie, Pomeranian Voivodeship, Poland), from where he came after 1945 as refugee to Schleswig-Holstein in northern West Germany. In order to get a free university education he emigrated to Communist GDR at the age of 18, and after facing initial doubts due to his heritage was allowed to join the Socialist Unity Party in 1963, but did not rise to leadership positions until shortly after the fall of communism and the resulting purge of hardliners from the party. He was rector of the University of Film and Television (Potsdam-Babelsberg) from 1986 to 1990. In 1991 he became a member of the board of directors of regional television channel ORB (now part of RBB).

== Stasi informer ==
In 1995, it was discovered that Bisky had been an informer for the Stasi. The Stasi records on his wife referred to his activities as an informant. Subsequent investigations revealed that Bisky was registered by the Stasi with the code names of Bienert between 1966 and 1970, and as Klaus Heine from 1987. Lothar Bisky was also described in Stasi records as zuverlässig (reliable), the highest level of trust for an informer.

When Bisky was promoted, the Main Directorate for Reconnaissance (German: Hauptverwaltung Aufklärung) of the Stasi issued a statement where Bisky was described as "a reliable comrade, who strictly follows orders and always is honest with the Ministry for State Security (Stasi)" ("ein zuverlässiger Genosse, der sich strikt an die gegebenen Anweisungen hält und gegenüber dem MfS stets ehrlich war").

== Political career ==
In 1990, he was a member of the Volkskammer and beginning in 1990 he was a member of the state parliament in Brandenburg.

He was chairman of the PDS from 1993 until his resignation in 2000 over a defeat for the executive committee on support for United Nations military intervention. He was re-elected chairman in 2003 after this "left turn" had cost the party its seats in the Bundestag in 2002. Bisky was seen to be on the moderate, social democratic wing of the party and was a long-time close ally of the party's most prominent figure, Gregor Gysi. He was often regarded for his abilities to lead meaningful discussions between parties of completely opposite viewpoints, be it within his own party or in media events with other groups.

The party returned strongly to the Bundestag in the 2005 election. Bisky, one of 54 Left MPs, was nominated by his party to become one of the six vice presidents of the Bundestag. When the new Bundestag was constituted on 18 October, however, he failed three times to be elected. Several MPs explained this with the fact that he was an informant of the Stasi. Later, he failed a fourth time, and subsequently gave up his bid for the vice president position which was given to Petra Pau instead.

== Personal life ==
Lothar Bisky was married and the father of three sons. His oldest son, Jens Bisky, is a journalist and writer and the second-oldest, Norbert Bisky, is a painter. His youngest son, Stephan Bisky, died in late 2008 while working towards his neuro-informatics doctorate at the University of Edinburgh.

He died in a hospital in Leipzig as a result of falling down the stairs in his apartment in August 2013.
