= Żelice, Pomeranian Voivodeship =

Żelice
- Village
- Location within Poland
- Coordinates: 54°13′24″N 16°56′12″E
- Country: Poland
- Voivodeship: Pomeranian
- County: Słupsk
- Gmina: Kępice
- Population: 60

Żelice [ʐɛˈlit͡sɛ] is a village in the administrative district of Gmina Kępice, in Słupsk County, Pomeranian Voivodeship, in northern Poland.
