= Trzcianka railway station =

Railway station in Trzcianka, Poland

Coordinates: 53.0337°N 16.4660°E

Trzcianka
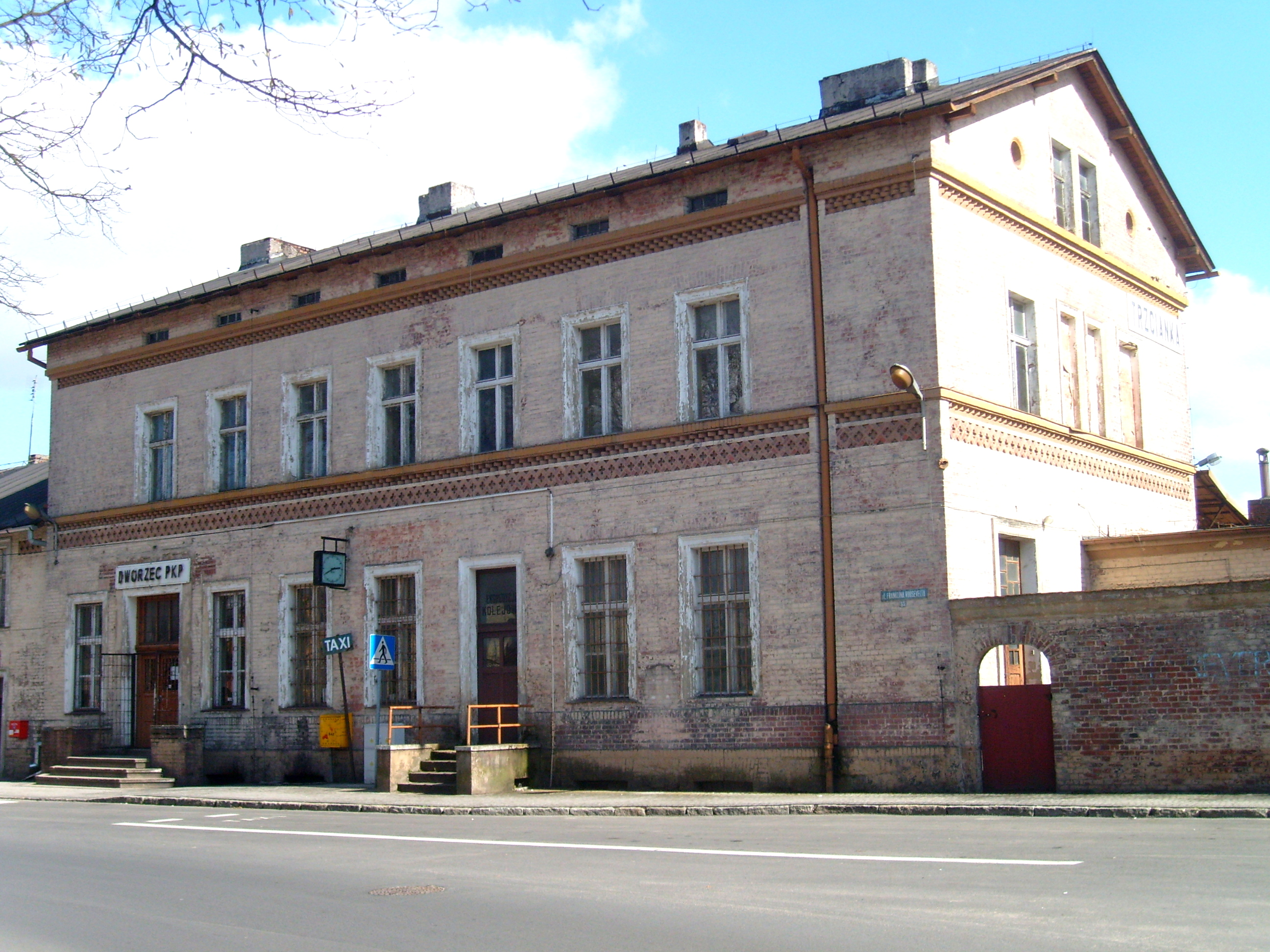
- Trzcianka railway station

General information
- Location: Trzcianka, Greater Poland Voivodeship; Poland
- System: Railway Station
- Operator: PKP; Polregio
- Line: 203: Tczew–Kostrzyn railway

History
- Opened: 1851; 175 years ago
- Former names: Schönlanke

Services
| Preceding station | PKP Intercity | Following station |
|---|---|---|
| Piła Główna towards Gdynia Główna | TLK | Wieleń towards Kostrzyn |
| Preceding station | Polregio | Following station |
| Siedlisko Czarnkowskie towards Krzyż | PR | Biała Pilska towards Chojnice |
Location
- Location within Poland

Trzcianka railway station is a railway station serving the town of Trzcianka, in the Greater Poland Voivodeship, Poland. The station opened in 1851 and is located on the Tczew–Kostrzyn railway. The train services are operated by PKP and Polregio.

== Train services ==
The station is served by the following service(s):

- Intercity services Szczecin - Stargard - Krzyz - Pila - Bydgoszcz - Torun - Kutno - Lowicz - Warsaw - Lublin - Rzeszow - Przemysl
- Intercity services Gorzow Wielkopolskie - Krzyz - Pila - Bydgoszcz - Torun - Kutno - Lowicz - Warsaw
- Intercity services (TLK) Gdynia Główna — Kostrzyn
- Regional services (R) Krzyz - Pila - Chojnice
