= Jabłoniec, Słupsk County =

Jabłoniec
- Settlement
- Location within Poland
- Coordinates: 54°14′4″N 16°59′54″E
- Country: Poland
- Voivodeship: Pomeranian
- County: Słupsk
- Gmina: Kępice
- Population: 0

Jabłoniec [jaˈbwɔɲɛt͡s] is a former settlement in the administrative district of Gmina Kępice, within Słupsk County, Pomeranian Voivodeship, in northern Poland.

For the history of the region, see History of Pomerania.
