= Mzdowiec =

- Settlement
- Location within Poland
- Coordinates: 54°10′41″N 16°46′2″E
- Country: Poland
- Voivodeship: Pomeranian
- County: Słupsk
- Gmina: Kępice
- Population: 39

Mzdowiec [ˈmzdɔvjɛt͡s] is a settlement in the administrative district of Gmina Kępice, within Słupsk County, Pomeranian Voivodeship, in northern Poland.

For the history of the region, see History of Pomerania.
