= Kawcze, Pomeranian Voivodeship =

Kawcze
- Village
- Location within Poland
- Coordinates: 54°04′06″N 16°53′08″E
- Country: Poland
- Voivodeship: Pomeranian
- County: Bytów
- Gmina: Miastko
- Population: 239

Kawcze [ˈkaft͡ʂɛ] (German: Kaffzig) is a village in Gmina Miastko, Bytów County, Pomeranian Voivodeship, in northern Poland.

From 1975 to 1998 the village was in Słupsk Voivodeship.

== Transport ==
Kawcze lies along the voivodeship road. In Kawcze there is a PKP railway station.

== See also ==
- Kawcze (PKP station)
