= Radzikowo =

- Settlement
- Location within Poland
- Coordinates: 54°17′20″N 17°0′48″E
- Country: Poland
- Voivodeship: Pomeranian
- County: Słupsk
- Gmina: Kępice
- Population: 0

Radzikowo [rad͡ʑiˈkɔvɔ] is a former settlement in the administrative district of Gmina Kępice, within Słupsk County, Pomeranian Voivodeship, in northern Poland.

For the history of the region, see History of Pomerania.
