= Kotłowo, Pomeranian Voivodeship =

Kotłowo
- Settlement
- Location within Poland
- Coordinates: 54°16′56″N 16°59′8″E
- Country: Poland
- Voivodeship: Pomeranian
- County: Słupsk
- Gmina: Kępice
- Population: 49

Kotłowo [kɔˈtwɔvɔ] is a settlement in the administrative district of Gmina Kępice, within Słupsk County, Pomeranian Voivodeship, in northern Poland.
