= Osowo, Słupsk County =

Osowo
- Village
- Location within Poland
- Coordinates: 54°12′58″N 16°48′37″E
- Country: Poland
- Voivodeship: Pomeranian
- County: Słupsk
- Gmina: Kępice
- Population: 270

Osowo [ɔˈsɔvɔ] (German: Wussow) is a village in the administrative district of Gmina Kępice, within Słupsk County, Pomeranian Voivodeship, in northern Poland.

For the history of the region, see History of Pomerania.
