= Kawka, Pomeranian Voivodeship =

Kawka
- Settlement
- Location within Poland
- Coordinates: 54°11′29″N 16°53′43″E
- Country: Poland
- Voivodeship: Pomeranian
- County: Słupsk
- Gmina: Kępice
- Population: 30

Kawka [ˈkafka] is a settlement in the administrative district of Gmina Kępice, located within Słupsk County, Pomeranian Voivodeship, in northern Poland.

For the history of the region, see History of Pomerania.
