= Osieczki =

- Settlement
- Location within Poland
- Coordinates: 54°16′11″N 16°53′21″E
- Country: Poland
- Voivodeship: Pomeranian
- County: Słupsk
- Gmina: Kępice

Osieczki [ɔˈɕɛt͡ʂki] is a settlement in the administrative district of Gmina Kępice, within Słupsk County, Pomeranian Voivodeship, in northern Poland.

For the history of the region, see History of Pomerania.
