= Łużki, Pomeranian Voivodeship =

Łużki
- Settlement
- Location within Poland
- Coordinates: 54°13′56″N 16°51′13″E
- Country: Poland
- Voivodeship: Pomeranian
- County: Słupsk
- Gmina: Kępice
- Population: 70

Łużki [ˈwuʂki] is a settlement in the administrative district of Gmina Kępice, within Słupsk County, Pomeranian Voivodeship, in northern Poland.

For the history of the region, see History of Pomerania.
