= Gościeradz, Słupsk County =

Gościeradz
- Settlement
- Location within Poland
- Coordinates: 54°17′59″N 16°54′17″E
- Country: Poland
- Voivodeship: Pomeranian
- County: Słupsk
- Gmina: Kępice
- Population: 21

Gościeradz (Polish: [ɡɔɕˈt͡ɕɛrat͡s]) is a settlement in the administrative district of Gmina Kępice, within Słupsk County, Pomeranian Voivodeship, in northern Poland.

For the history of the region, see History of Pomerania.
