= Bronowo, Słupsk County =

Bronowo
- Village
- Location within Poland
- Coordinates: 54°15′33″N 17°0′30″E
- Country: Poland
- Voivodeship: Pomeranian
- County: Słupsk
- Gmina: Kępice
- Population: 160

Bronowo [brɔˈnɔvɔ] is a village in the administrative district of Gmina Kępice, within Słupsk County, Pomeranian Voivodeship, in northern Poland.

For the history of the region, see History of Pomerania.
