= Wieprza =

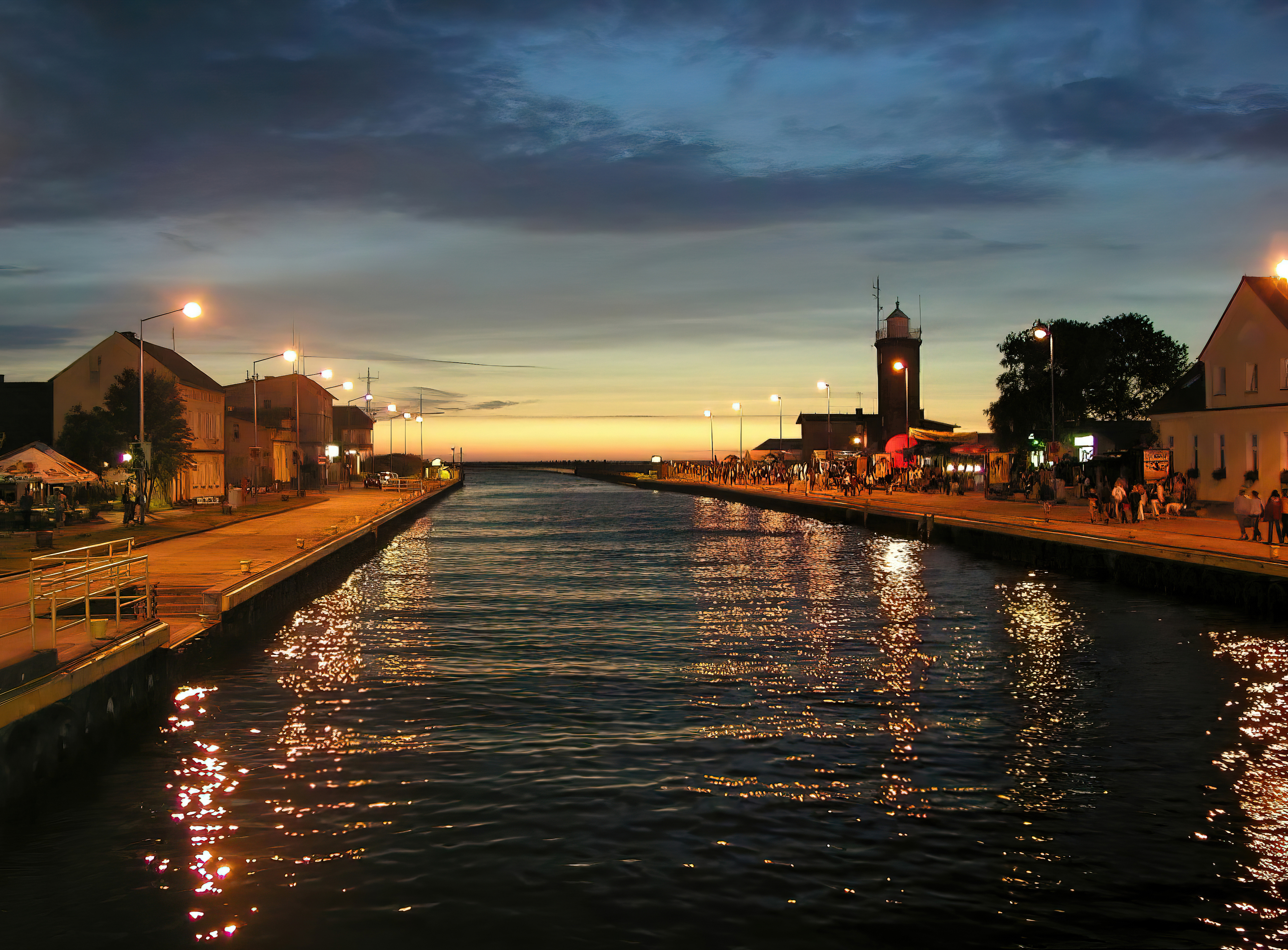
- Wieprza river mouth in Darłówko

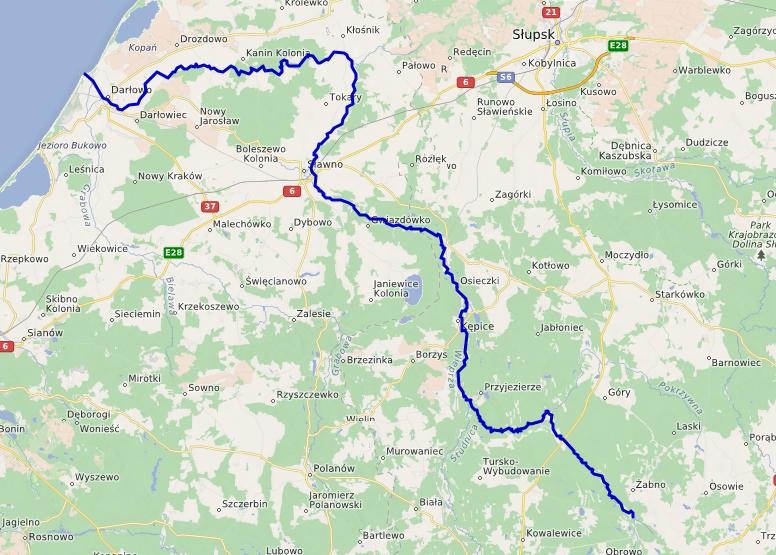

- Location of the mouth in Poland

Location
- Country: Poland
- Voivodeship: Pomeranian; West Pomeranian

Physical characteristics
- Source
  - location: Lake Kołoleż
  - coordinates: 54°2′46″N 17°12′22″E
- Mouth: Baltic Sea
  - location: Darłowo
  - coordinates: 54°26′25″N 16°22′38″E

The Wieprza (German: Wipper) is a river in north-western Poland in the region of Pomerania, a tributary of the Baltic Sea, with a length of 112 km (70 mi) and a basin area of 2,170 km^{2} (840 sq mi).

== Towns ==
- Kępice
- Sławno
- Darłowo

== See also ==
- Rivers of Poland
- List of rivers of Europe
