= Barwino =

- Village
- Location within Poland
- Coordinates: 54°17′23″N 16°54′52″E
- Country: Poland
- Voivodeship: Pomeranian
- County: Słupsk
- Gmina: Kępice
- Population: 174

Barwino [barˈvinɔ]) is a village in the administrative district of Gmina Kępice, within Słupsk County, Pomeranian Voivodeship, in northern Poland.
