= Przyjezierze, Pomeranian Voivodeship =

Przyjezierze
- Village
- Location within Poland
- Coordinates: 54°11′3″N 16°55′23″E
- Country: Poland
- Voivodeship: Pomeranian
- County: Słupsk
- Gmina: Kępice
- Population: 33

Przyjezierze [pʂɨjɛˈʑɛʐɛ] is a village in the administrative district of Gmina Kępice, within Słupsk County, Pomeranian Voivodeship, in northern Poland.

For the history of the region, see History of Pomerania.
