= Walter Flex =

German writer (1887–1917)

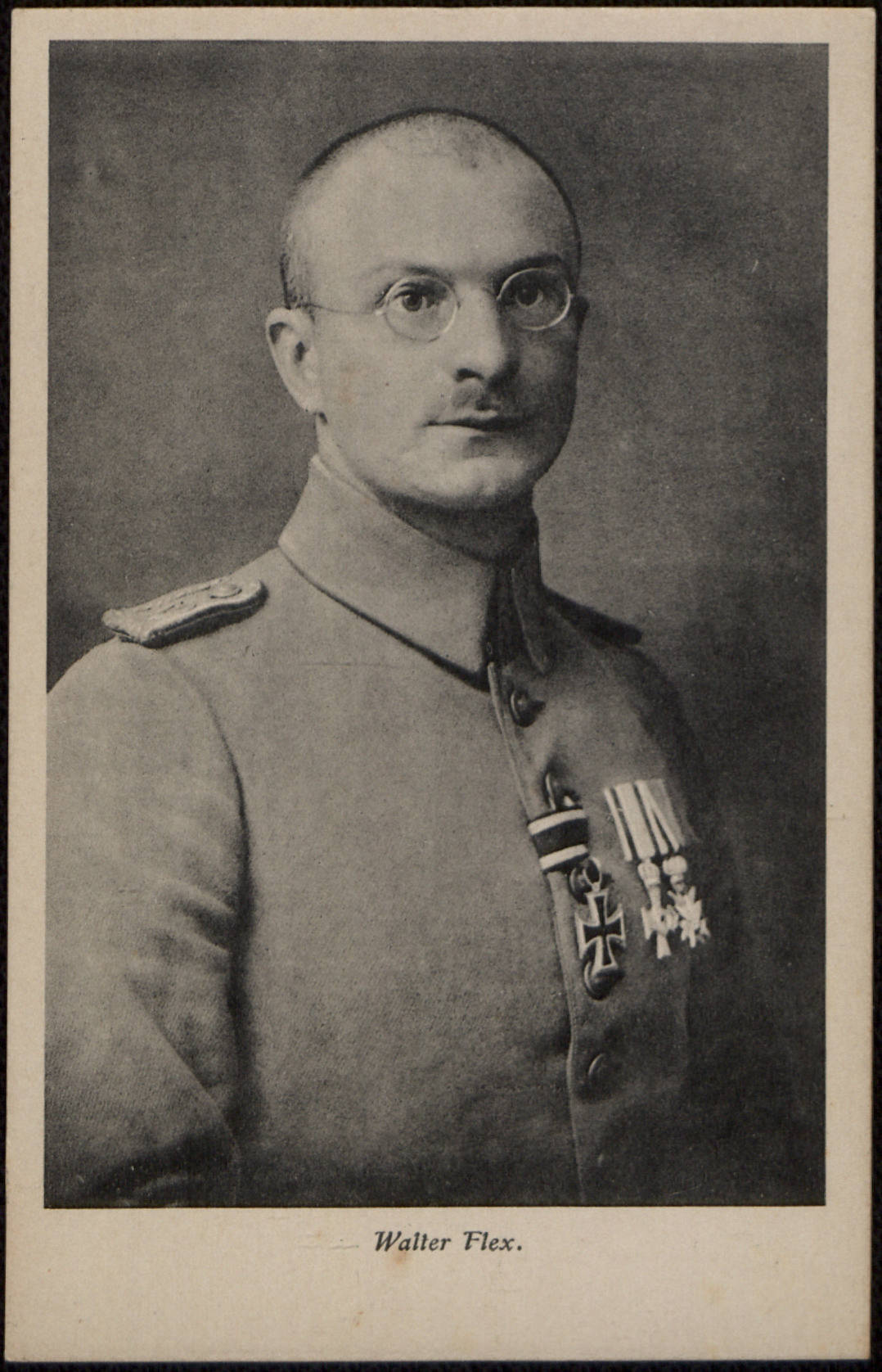
- Born: 6 July 1887; Eisenach, Saxe-Weimar-Eisenach, German Empire
- Died: 16 October 1917 (aged 30); Pöide Parish, Governorate of Livonia, Russia
- Cause of death: Died of wounds
- Occupations: Author, lyricist

Walter Flex (6 July 1887 – 16 October 1917) was a German author of The Wanderer between the Two Worlds: An Experience of War (Der Wanderer zwischen beiden Welten) of 1916, a war novel dealing with themes of humanity, friendship, and suffering during World War I. Due to his idealism about Prussian virtues and the Great War, as well as the posthumous popularity of his writings, Walter Flex is sometimes compared to Allied war poets Rupert Brooke and Alan Seeger.

== Biography ==
Walter Flex's first grave at the Pöide cemetery

Walter Flex was born at Eisenach, in the Grand Duchy of Saxe-Weimar-Eisenach, on July 6, 1887. The second of four sons, Walter's father, a secondary school teacher, was a fervent admirer of Otto von Bismarck, and all four of his sons were brought up to revere the former German Chancellor.

Flex had a happy childhood and showed no interest in the world until the Second Anglo-Boer War began in 1898. Due to his sympathy for "the underdog", Flex, like many other Germans of his time, sympathised with the Boer Republics in their battle against the British Empire.

Flex went to the University of Erlangen where he studied German, thanks to the award of a bursary.

According to Tim Cross, "Walter Flex's first attempt at drama was the tragedy Demetrius, about the Tsarist Pretender. In his following works for the stage, social problems form the core, as in Lothar, Die Bauernführer, Das heilige Blut, and Der Kanzler Klaus von Bismarck. These revolve around the premise that society is necessary. Each individual is like a thread, insignificant, disposable, and only makes sense if he is a thread woven into the fabric of the carpet. Interesting as these plays are in the context in which they were written, it cannot be claimed that Flex was an original writer as a dramatist, as he laboured much under the influence of Hebbel. His poetry is the least distinguished of his output, and appears more as an exercise towards the prose works such as Wallenstein and Der Wanderer."

Flex was successful academically and became a teacher like his father. His first appointment was as a private tutor to the family of Chancellor von Bismarck. A later appointment was to the family of Baron von Leesen, but this was interrupted by the outbreak of the Great War in August 1914.

Despite weak ligaments in his right hand, Flex volunteered for the Imperial German Army in his mother's birthplace of Rawitsch and was assigned to the 50th Infantry. By September 1914, Flex saw combat in the Argonne.

According to Tim Cross, "His poetic outpourings on the war were prolific. Two collections, Sonne und Schild and Im Felde zwischen Tag und Nacht were produced in the first months of the war. His body, soul, and literary talent were placed wholly at the disposal of the war-effort. The Christmas Fable for the 50th Regiment earned him the Order of the Red Eagle with Crown."

While going through officer training at Posen in early 1915, Flex met Ernst Wurche, a fellow member of the Wandervogel youth movement. Wurche lived by the motto, "To stay pure is to mature." Wurche also always carried three books in his backpack: the New Testament, the poems of Goethe, and Friedrich Nietzsche's Also Sprach Zarathustra.

Flex viewed Wurche as the epitome of the new German and made his friend the subject of the novella Der Wanderer zwischen Beiden Welten ("A Wanderer between Two Worlds"), which has never been out of print since its first publication.

Taking part in Operation Albion, Flex was wounded in action. He died of his wounds at Oti Manor, in Saaremaa on October 16, 1917.

Walter Flex was buried in the cemetery of Peude Church in the village of the same name, on Saaremaa island, in modern Estonia.

His epitaph was a quote from one of his works Preußischer Fahneneid ("The Prussian Military Oath" written in 1915):

"Wer je auf Preußens Fahne schwört,
Hat nichts mehr, was ihm selbst gehört."

(Translation:

"He who on Prussia's banner swears
has nothing left that belongs to himself.")

== Legacy ==
His Wanderer zwischen beiden Welten was published in 1916, by Verlag C. H. Beck, and was well received. By 1917, over 700,000 copies had been printed in Germany—a testament to his extreme popularity with the wartime public.

Tim Cross compares Flex's posthumous popularity and the idealization of his wartime death with the similar cultus surrounding English war poet Rupert Brooke.

Under the Weimar Republic, Flex's reputation grew further. Between 1933 and 1945, Flex's romanticism and idealism were exploited for propaganda by the Nazi Party, which found his poetry and prose especially appealing and considered Flex the epitome of Aryan ideals.

According to Flex, however, it was "not national patriotism I represent, but demands for the moral good. When I wrote about the perpetuity of the German race and about the deliverence of the world by the Germanic, it had nothing to do with national egotism; rather it is a moral conviction which can be realized as much in the defeat or in the heroic sacrifice of a nation."

In 1940, Flex's body was moved from Estonia to a new military cemetery before of the Sackenheimer Tor at Königsberg (now Kaliningrad, Russia). Walter Flex's grave, along with the rest the city, was destroyed in Allied air raids and during the three-month siege previous to the city's surrender to the Red Army on April 9, 1945.

As a song, Flex's poem Wildgänse rauschen durch die Nacht gained popularity with the Wandervogel youth and was well known and sung in Germany until the 1970s.

During the time of (and partly due to his influence on) the German student movement, his reputation faded almost entirely .

== Memorial markers ==
- The house (built in 1723) where Flex lived during his student days (1906–1908) is at Friedrichstraße 16. Erlangen, Germany has a historical marker.
- A cenotaph is at Walter Flex's birthplace in Eisenach, Germany. The cross is a replica of the one at Peude which originally marked his grave. It was made by Eisenach-born Hermann Hosaeus. The inscription reads as follows:

Für
Kaiser und
Reich fiel
der kgl. [königlich] preuß. [preußische] Leutnant
Walter Flex
bei Peudehof
am 16. Oktober
1917
geb. [geboren] in
Eisenach
am 6. Juli
1887.
Wer
auf die
preußische
Fahne
schwört[,]
hat nichts
mehr[,]
was ihm
selber
gehört[.]

Translation:

For
the Kaiser
and the Empire
The Royal Prussian Lieutenant
Walter Flex fell
at Peudehof
on 16 October 1917,
born in Eisenach
on 6 July 1887.
"Whoever by the Prussian banner swears,
Has nothing left that belongs to himself."

- The New Cemetery (Neuer Friedhof), Eisenach, Germany has a tombstone for Flex.

== Works ==
- Briefe. In Verbindung mit Konrad Flex. München, C.H. Beck [1927]. 333 pp.
- Demetrius: Ein Trauerspiel. Berlin: [Fischer, 1909?]. 147 p.; 18 cm.
- Klaus von Bismarck: Eine Tragödie; [Bühnen u. Vereinen gegenüber Ms.] Berlin: Janke, 1913. 136 pp.
- Zwölf Bismarcks: 7 Novellen. Berlin: Janke, 1913.
- Das Volk in Eisen: Kriegsgesänge eines Kriegs-Freiwilligen. Ein Ehrendenkmal für meinen für Kaiser und Reich gefallenen lieben Bruder, den Lt. Otto Flex, Inf.-Reg. 160. Kriegsgesänge e. Kriegs-Freiwilligen . Second edition. Lissa i .P.: Eulitz, [ca. 1914]. 20 pp.
- Zwei eigenhändige Ansichtskarten mit Unterschrift. n.p.: n.p., [1914?].
- Der Kanzler Klaus von Bismarck. Eine Erzählung. Stuttgart, Evang. gesellschaft, [1915]. 196 p.; 20 cm.
- Der Wanderer zwischen beiden Welten (1916)
- Der Wanderer zwischen beiden Welten: Ein Kriegserlebnis. Third edition. München: Beck, 1917. 106 p.; 19 cm.
- Der Wanderer zwischen beiden Welten: Ein Kriegserlebnis. 687. bis 712. Taus. München, [1917]. Print run of copies 687,000 to 712,000. OCLC 186818957
- The Wanderer between the Two Worlds: An Experience of War. London: Rott Publishing, 2014. First translation into English by Brian Murdoch.
- Kriegspatenbriefe. 1, Leutnantsdienst: neue Gedichte aus dem Felde. Lissa : Eulitz, [1917]. 28 pp.
- Flex, Walter: Gesammelte Werke. München, Germany: C. H. Beck´sche Verlh. First edition. Vol. 1. (1925). xxxix pp., 450 pp.
- Flex, Walter: Gesammelte Werke. München, Germany: C. H. Beck´sche Verlh. First edition. Vol. 2. (1925). 540 pp.
- Flex, Walter: Gesammelte Werke. München, Germany: C. H. Beck´sche Verlh. Fourth edition. Vol. 1. (1936). 691 pp.; 20 cm.
- Flex, Walter: Gesammelte Werke. München, Germany: C. H. Beck´sche Verlh. Fourth edition. Vol. 2. (1936). 811 pp.; 20 cm.
- Flex, Walter: Gesammelte Werke. München, Germany: C. H. Beck´sche Verlh. Ninth edition. Vol. 1. (1944). 691 pp.
- Flex, Walter: Gesammelte Werke. München, Germany: C. H. Beck´sche Verlh. Ninth edition. Vol. 2. (1955). 539 pp.

== Memorial volume ==
- Walter Flex Gedenkheft [Hrsg. anläßl. d. 15. Todestages des Dichters] . (Title translation: Walter Flex Commemorative Booklet: Edited on the Occasion of the 15th Anniversary of the Poet's Death .] ) [Stendal, Breitestr. 55] [Karl August Richter] 1931.
