= Kuźnik, Pomeranian Voivodeship =

Village in Pomeranian, Poland

Kuźnik
- Settlement
- Location within Poland
- Coordinates: 54°16′2″N 17°0′43″E
- Country: Poland
- Voivodeship: Pomeranian
- County: Słupsk
- Gmina: Kępice
- Population: 0

Kuźnik [ˈkuʑnik] is a former settlement in the administrative district of Gmina Kępice, within Słupsk County, Pomeranian Voivodeship, in northern Poland.

For the history of the region, see History of Pomerania.
