= Przytocko =

- Village
- Location within Poland
- Coordinates: 54°7′11″N 16°50′11″E
- Country: Poland
- Voivodeship: Pomeranian
- County: Słupsk
- Gmina: Kępice
- Population: 402

Przytocko [pʂɨˈtɔt͡skɔ] (German: Pritzig) is a village in the administrative district of Gmina Kępice, within Słupsk County, Pomeranian Voivodeship, in northern Poland.

For the history of the region, see History of Pomerania.
