= Wild Geese (song) =

Wildgänse rauschen durch die Nacht
- by Walter Flex & Robert Götz
- Native name: Wild Geese Rush Through the Night
- Other name: Wild Geese
- Key: G Major
- Year: 1917
- Genre: War song
- Language: German

"Wildgänse rauschen durch die Nacht" (Wild geese rush through the night) is a war poem by Walter Flex. It was published in 1917 in his collection of poems Im Felde zwischen Nacht und Tag (In the (battle) field between day and night). The poem was also included in his 1916 novel Der Wanderer zwischen beiden Welten (The Wanderer Between Two Worlds).

The lyrics achieved popularity through a musical adaptation written by Robert Götz. Götz's melody existed as early as 1917 and the song became popular among members of the Wandervogel movement / Bündische Jugend society during the late 1920s. It is also sung in the Austrian, German and French (as "Les Oies sauvages") army.

== Creation ==
The date of creation of the lyrics are unknown. The inspiration for the poem is described in his memoirs The Wanderer Between Two Worlds:

I was lying as a war volunteer on the forest clearing plowed by grenades as I was a hundred nights before as a listening post and stared into the flickering light of the stormy night which was criss-crossed by the restless spotlights on German and French trenches. The roar of the oncoming night storm swelled up on me. Strange voices filled the quivering air. Over helmet tip and rifle barrel it sang and whistled, cutting, shrill and plaintive, and high over the hostile armies, which lurked opposite to each in the darkness, went with razor-sharp cry a migratory grey geese flight northbound. ... The cordon of our Silesian regiment stretched from Bois des Chevaliers to the Bois de Vérines, and the army of migratory wild geese ranged ghostlike above us all. Without seeing my intertwined lines in the darkness, I wrote on a scrap of paper a few verses: ..."

The Wanderer Between Two Worlds achieved great popularity in Germany. After participating in the Lake Naroch offensive, Flex returned to Berlin to write a series of reports on the offensive, which was published posthumously in 1919 as Die russische Frühjahrsoffensive 1916 (The Russian Spring Offensive of 1916). He died on 17 October 1917 from wounds sustained during Operation Albion.

== Poem ==
Wildgänse rauschen durch die Nacht
mit schrillem Schrei nach Norden.
Unstete (Note: archaic 'unstäte' in the original) Fahrt! Habt acht, habt acht!
Die Welt ist voller Morden.

Fahrt durch die nachtdurchwogte Welt,
graureisige Geschwader!
Fahlhelle zuckt, und Schlachtruf gellt,
weit wallt und wogt der Hader.

Rausch' zu, fahr' zu, du graues Heer!
Rauscht zu, fahrt zu nach Norden!
Fahrt ihr nach Süden übers Meer –
was ist aus uns geworden!

Wir sind wie ihr ein graues Heer
und fahr'n in Kaisers Namen,
und fahr'n wir ohne Wiederkehr,
rauscht uns im Herbst ein Amen!

Direct translation
Wild geese are rushing through the night
With shrilling cry northbound –
Unsteady way! Attention, be wary!
The world is full of murder.

Travel through the world surged through by the night,
Gray traveling squadrons!
Wan light quivers, and battle cry yells,
Far surges and heaves the quarrel.

Rush on, travel on, you gray-colored host!
Rush on, travel on to the north!
When you travel southwards over the sea –
What will have become of us!

We are like you a gray-colored host
And travel in the name of the emperor,
And if we travel without return,
Rush an amen for us in autumn!

Poetic translation
Wild geese are rushing through the night
With shrilling cry northbound their heading –
Attention, take care! Unsteady flight!
The world is full of murdering.

Fly through the world engulfed by night,
Gray soldier squadron!
Battle cry yelling, wan quivering light,
Far heaves the quarrels cauldron.

Gray-colored host, rush on, fly – flee!
Rush on, fly on to the north!
When you fly south across the sea –
What will our fate have brought forth!

We are like you a host in gray
We fly on the emperors call,
If sans return we fly away,
Rush an amen for us in fall!

== Melody ==
Source
