= Biesowice =

- Village
- Location within Poland
- Coordinates: 54°11′39″N 16°52′34″E
- Country: Poland
- Voivodeship: Pomeranian
- County: Słupsk
- Gmina: Kępice
- Population: 950

Biesowice [bjɛsɔˈvit͡sɛ] (German: Beßwitz) is a village in the administrative district of Gmina Kępice, within Słupsk County, Pomeranian Voivodeship, in northern Poland.

== See also ==
- History of Pomerania
