= Barcino, Poland =

Barcino
- Village
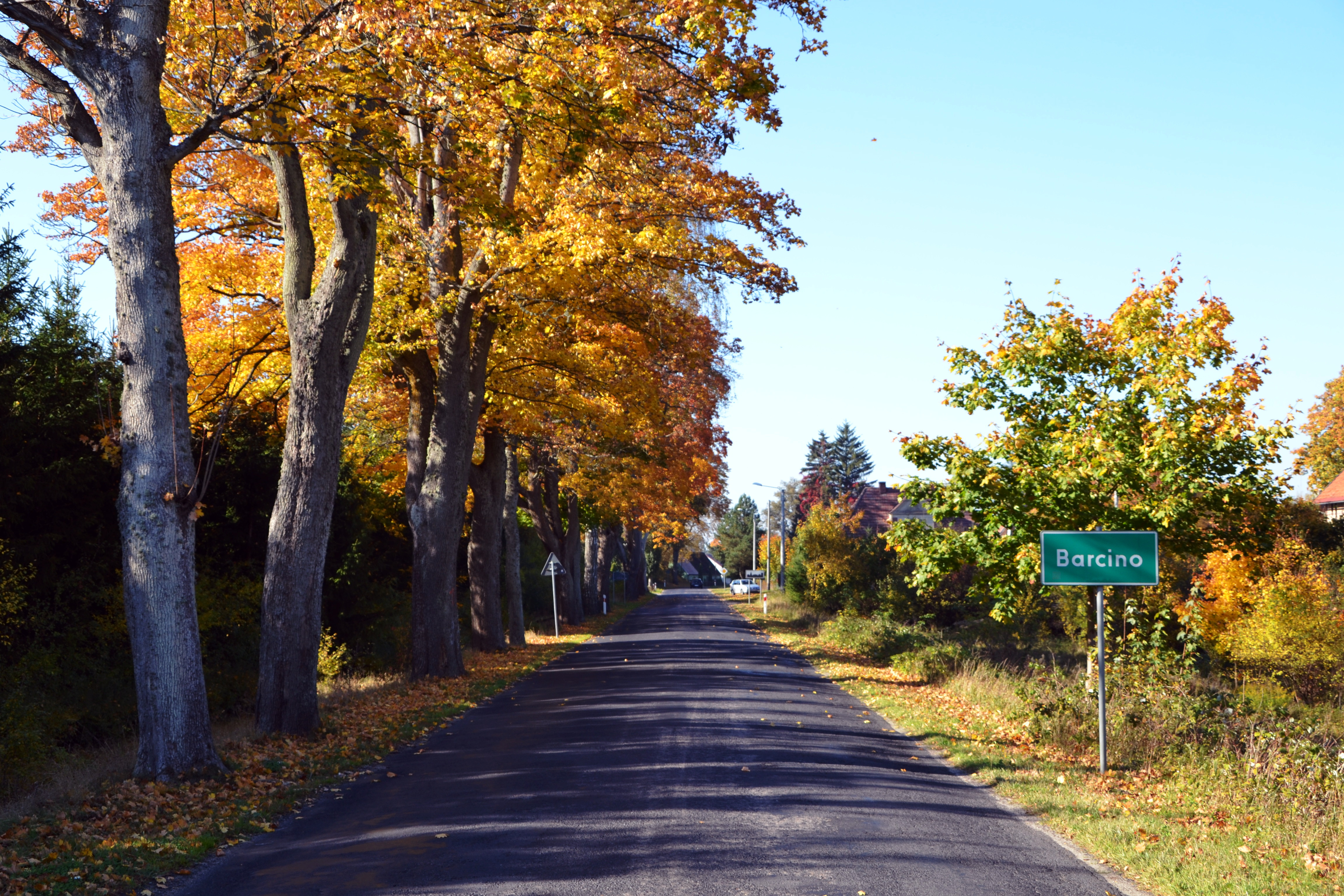
- Entry into the village

- Location within Poland
- Coordinates: 54°16′41″N 16°57′40″E
- Country: Poland
- Voivodeship: Pomeranian
- County: Słupsk
- Gmina: Kępice
- Population: 577

Barcino (Polish: [barˈt͡ɕinɔ]; German: Bartin) is a village in the administrative district of Gmina Kępice, within Słupsk County, Pomeranian Voivodeship, in northern Poland.

The village was once the site of an estate and manor which belonged to the Puttkamer noble family.

== Railway station ==
Barcino was a railway station in Barcino (54.2771°N 16.9619°E), Poland. Lines crossing the station are:

Start station	End station	Line type
Lipusz	Korzybie	Closed

== See also ==
- History of Pomerania
