= Gmina Kępice =

Gmina Kępice Kępice Commune
- Gmina
- Flag Coat of arms
- Interactive map of Gmina Kępice
- Coordinates (Kępice): 54°14′28″N 16°53′23″E
- Country: Poland
- Voivodeship: Pomeranian
- County: Słupsk County
- Seat: Kępice

Area
  - Total: 293.43 km^{2} (113.29 sq mi)

Population (2006)
  - Total: 9,688
  - Density: 33.02/km^{2} (85.51/sq mi)
  - Urban: 3,829
  - Rural: 5,859
- Website: http://kepice.pl/

Gmina Kępice is an urban-rural gmina (administrative district) in Słupsk County, Pomeranian Voivodeship, in northern Poland. Its seat is the town of Kępice, which lies approximately 27 kilometres (17 mi) south of Słupsk and 115 km (71 mi) west of the regional capital Gdańsk.

The gmina covers an area of 293.43 square kilometres (113.3 sq mi), and as of 2006 its total population is 9,688 (out of which the population of Kępice amounts to 3,829, and the population of the rural part of the gmina is 5,859).

== Villages ==
Apart from the town of Kępice, Gmina Kępice contains the villages and settlements of Barcino, Barwino, Biesowice, Biesowiczki, Borzysław, Bronowo, Bronowo-Kolonia, Brzezinka, Chorówko, Chorowo, Ciecholub, Darnowo, Gościeradz, Jabłoniec, Jabłonna, Kaczyno, Kawka, Korzybie, Kotłowo, Kuźnik, Lipnik, Łużki, Mielęcino, Mzdowiec, Mzdówko, Mzdowo, Obłęże, Osieczki, Osieki, Osowo, Płocko, Podgóry, Podgóry-Kolonia, Polichno, Przyjezierze, Przytocko, Pustowo, Radzikowo, Szoferajka, Warcino, Wąsochy, Węgorzyno, Zawistowo, Żelice and Żelice Dolne.

== Neighbouring gminas ==
Gmina Kępice is bordered by the gminas of Kobylnica, Miastko, Polanów, Sławno, Słupsk and Trzebielino.
