= Ciecholub =

- Village
- Location within Poland
- Coordinates: 54°10′30″N 16°52′35″E
- Country: Poland
- Voivodeship: (Pomeranian Voivodeship) Pomeranian
- County: Słupsk
- Gmina: Kępice
- Population: 161

Ciecholub [t͡ɕɛˈxɔlup] (German: Techlipp) is a village in the administrative district of Gmina Kępice, within Słupsk County, Pomeranian Voivodeship, in northern Poland.

For the history of the region, see History of Pomerania.
