= Kępice =

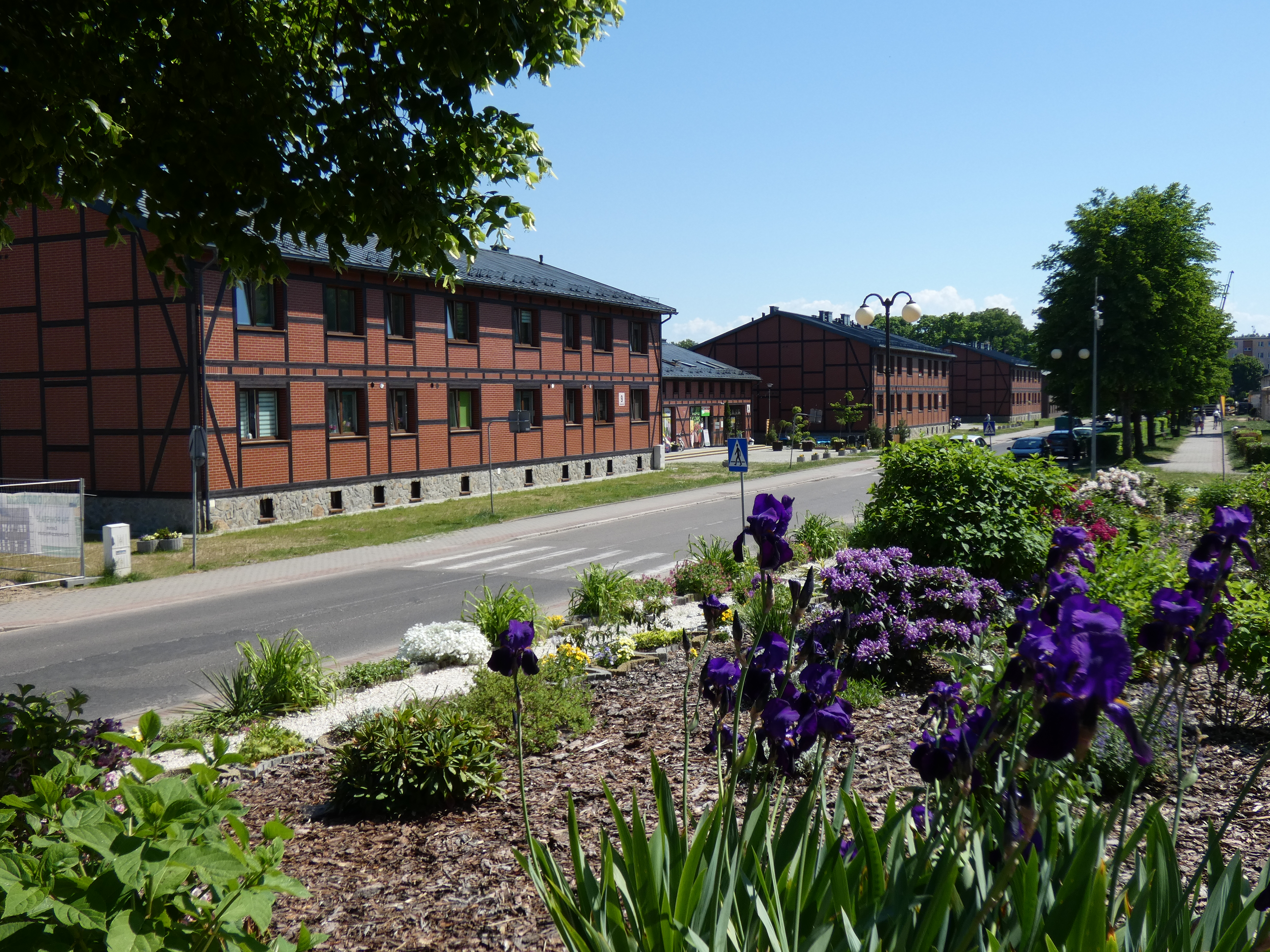
- Ulica Niepodległości (Independence Street) in Kępice

- Flag Coat of arms

- Location within Poland
- Coordinates: 54°14′28″N 16°53′23″E
- Country: Poland
- Voivodeship: Pomeranian
- County: Słupsk
- Gmina: Kępice
- Town rights: 1967

Government
  - Mayor: Przemysław Wolański

Area
  - Total: 6.11 km^{2} (2.36 sq mi)

Population (2017)
  - Total: 3,646
  - Density: 597/km^{2} (1,550/sq mi)
- Time zone: UTC+1 (CET)
  - Summer (DST): UTC+2 (CEST)
- Postal code: 77–230
- Vehicle registration: GSL
- Website: http://www.kepice.pl

Kępice [kɛmˈpʲit͡sɛ] (Kashubian: Kãpice, or Hômer; German: Hammermühle) is a town and seat of Gmina Kępice in Słupsk County, Pomeranian Voivodeship, northern Poland. It has 3,646 inhabitants and is 6.11 square kilometres (2.36 sq mi) in size.

== History ==
During World War II, the German administration operated two forced labour subcamps of the Stalag II-B prisoner-of-war camp for Allied POWs.

Kępice was granted town rights in 1967.
