= Piła Główna railway station =

Railway station in Piła, Poland

Piła Główna
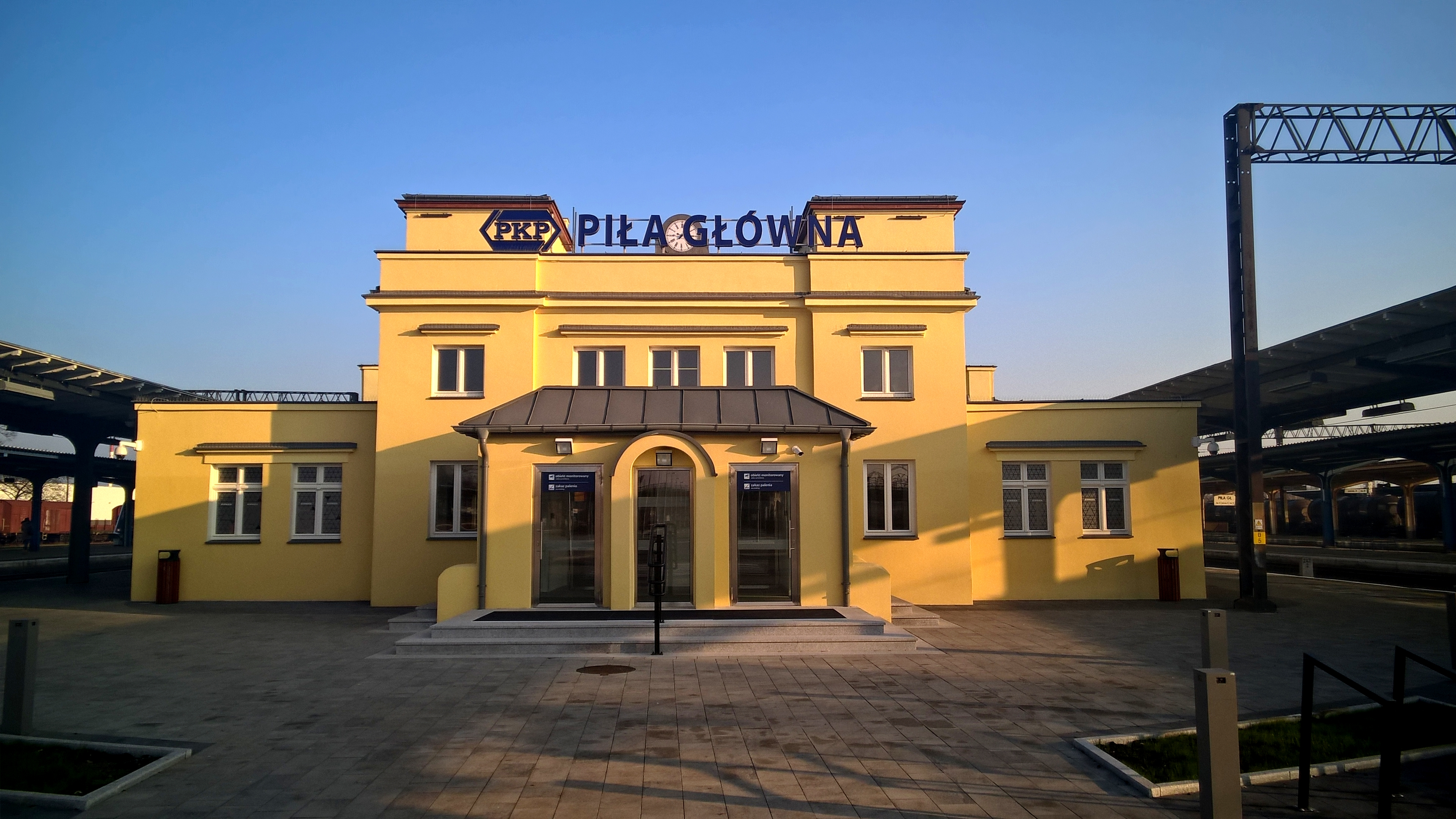
- Piła Główna railway station

General information
- Location: ul. Zygmunta Starego 1, Piła, Greater Poland Voivodeship; Poland
- Coordinates: 53°08′35″N 16°44′39″E
- System: Railway Station
- Operator: PKP; Polregio
- Lines: Kutno–Piła railway Poznań–Piła railway Tczew–Kostrzyn railway Piła–Ustka railway Piła–Ulikowo railway Bzowo Goraj–Piła railway (freight)
- Platforms: 10
- Tracks: 19

History
- Opened: 27 July 1851; 175 years ago
- Rebuilt: 2014–2015
- Former names: Schneidemühl

Services
| Preceding station | PKP Intercity | Following station |
|---|---|---|
| Krajenka towards Gdynia Główna | TLK | Trzcianka towards Kostrzyn |
| Preceding station | Polregio | Following station |
| Terminus | PR | Kaczory towards Bydgoszcz Główna |
| Szydłowo Krajeńskie towards Szczecin Główny | PR | Terminus |
| Stobno towards Krzyż | PR | Piła Podlasie towards Chojnice |
| Stara Łubianka towards Szczecinek | PR | Piła Kalina towards Poznań Główny |
Location
- Location within Poland

Piła Główna (lit. 'Piła Main') is the main railway station of the city of Piła, in the Greater Poland Voivodeship, Poland. The station opened on 27 July 1851.

== History ==
The station is one of the largest and most important railway junctions in northern Poland, located in the north western city of Piła. The complex is located in southern part of the centre of the city, at 1 Sigismund I the Old Street. Its construction began in 1853, when Pila belonged to the German Empire. The station was part of the newly built Prussian Eastern Railway, which opened in 1851 and reached Pila on 27 July 1851.

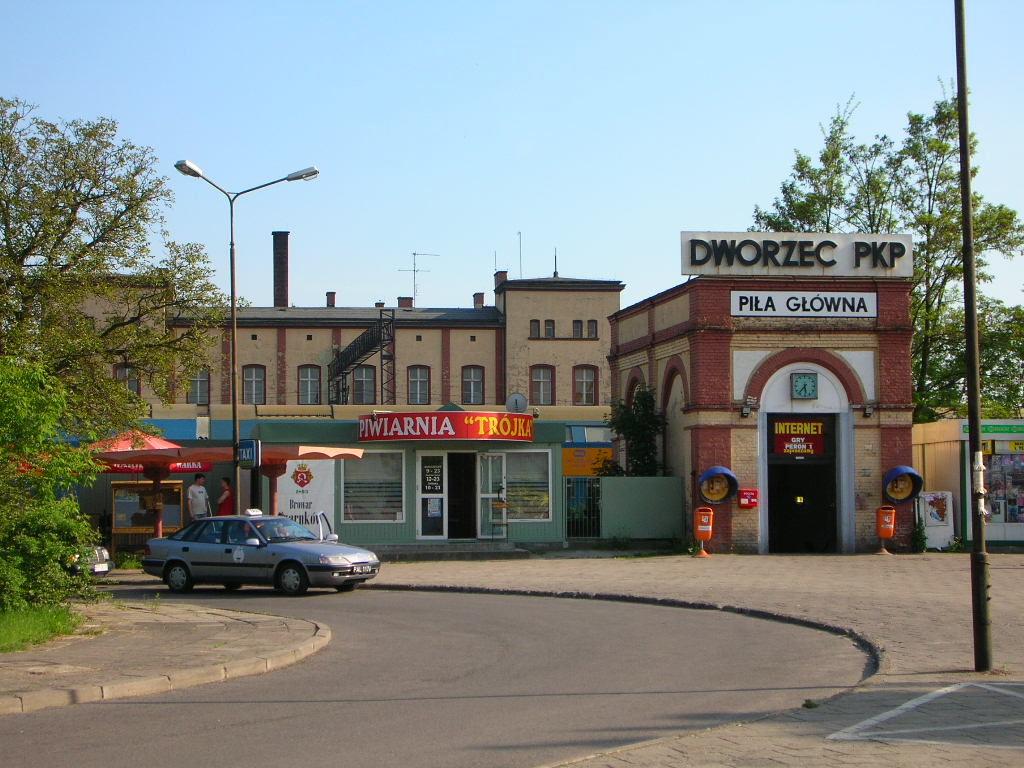
The entrance to the station

Construction of the complex was not completed until 1876, and in the subsequent years, many changes were introduced. Meanwhile, the importance of Piła as a junction grew, with construction of several other connections. In January 1871, a line to Złotów was opened, in May 1879, a line from Poznań to Szczecinek via Piła, and in November 1881, a line to Wałcz was completed. Within 30 years, Piła became a nexus of great importance, and in 1913, the station served some 575,000 people.

Currently, the station has ten platforms. All the tracks are electrified, electrification work being completed in 1990. Over the tracks is a 230-metre-long road overpass, built in 1975.

On 19 May 1988, there was a train crash involving a military transport train of the Polish Army at the station in which 10 soldiers died and 28 were injured.

== Modernisation ==
The station was rebuilt between May 2014 and October 2015. The modernised station was opened on 26 October 2015.

== Train services ==
The station is served by the following services:

- Intercity services (TLK) Gdynia Główna - Kostrzyn
- Regional services (PR) Piła - Bydgoszcz
- Regional services (PR) Szczecin - Stargard - Kalisz Pomorski - Pila
- Regional services (PR) Krzyz - Pila - Chojnice
- Regional services (PR) Szczecinek - Piła Główna - Poznań Główny

== Coach station ==
Near the station, close to the northern entrance, is a bus station of Przedsiebiorstwo Komunikacji Samochodowej.

== See also ==
- Okrąglak roundhouse in Piła
