= Aumühle =

- Municipality
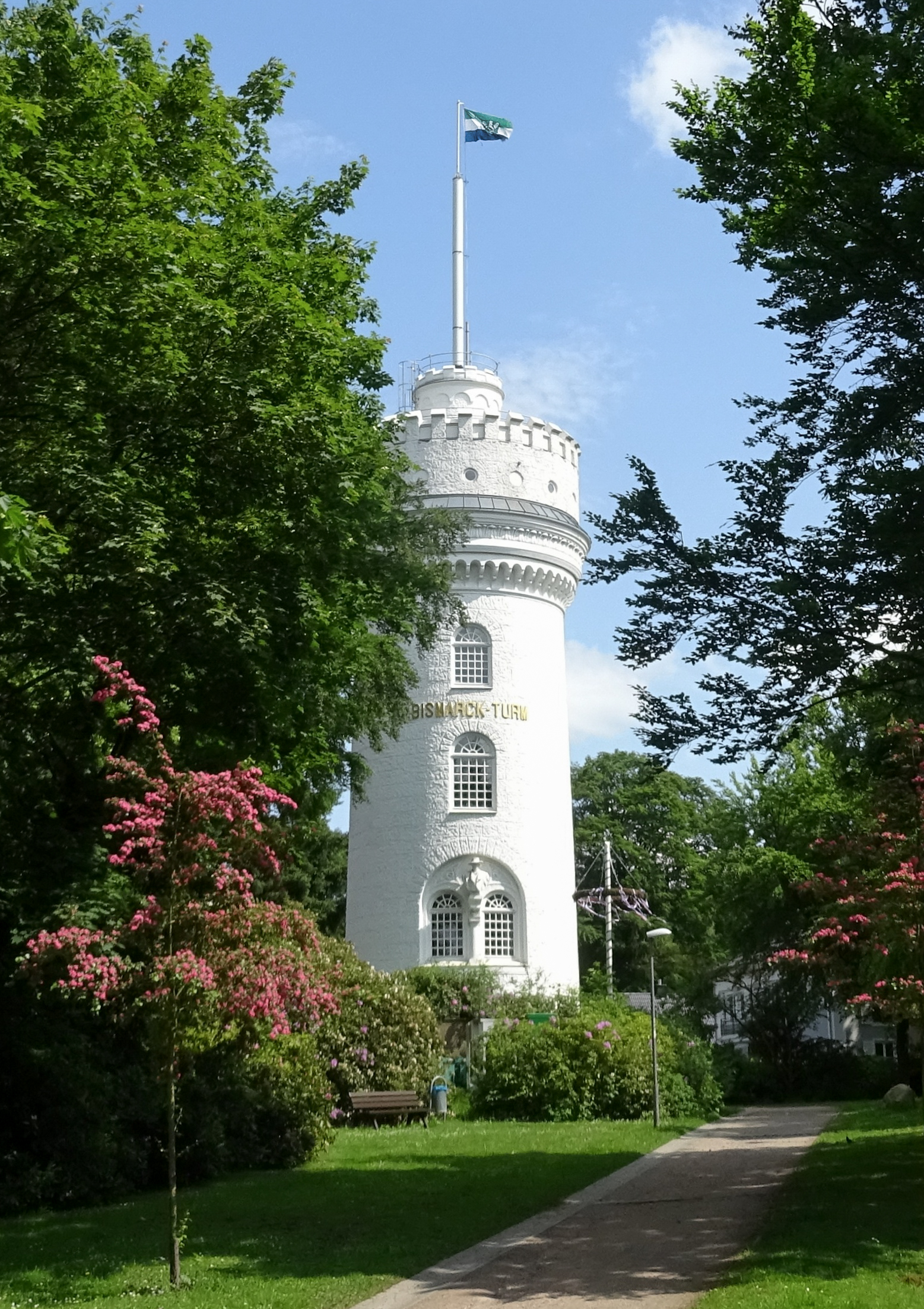
- Bismarck tower in Aumühle

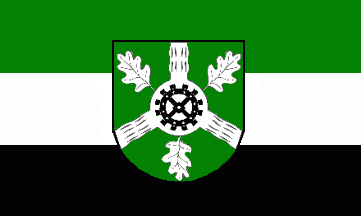
- Flag Coat of arms

- Location of Aumühle within Herzogtum Lauenburg district
- Interactive map of Aumühle
- Location within Germany Location within Schleswig-Holstein
- Coordinates: 53°31′54″N 10°18′55″E
- Country: Germany
- State: Schleswig-Holstein
- District: Herzogtum Lauenburg
- Municipal assoc.: Hohe Elbgeest

Government
  - Mayor: Knut Suhk

Area
  - Total: 3.47 km^{2} (1.34 sq mi)
- Elevation: 30 m (98 ft)

Population (2025-12-31)
  - Total: 3,241
  - Density: 934/km^{2} (2,420/sq mi)
- Time zone: UTC+01:00 (CET)
  - Summer (DST): UTC+02:00 (CEST)
- Postal codes: 21521
- Dialling codes: 04104
- Vehicle registration: RZ
- Website: Official website

Aumühle (German: [aʊˈmyːlə]) is a municipality in Schleswig-Holstein in northern Germany, about 21 km (14 mi) east of Hamburg. Its Friedrichsruh district is home to the family estate and mausoleum of Otto von Bismarck.

== Geography ==
Aumühle lies on the river Bille in the Sachsenwald, the largest forest in Schleswig-Holstein.

== History ==
In 1350 Aumühle was first mentioned in writing as Au-Mühle (mill on the river Au).

In 1846, a station on the newly-constructed Hamburg-Berlin railway line was opened at Friedrichsruh. Aumühle station itself was added in 1884.

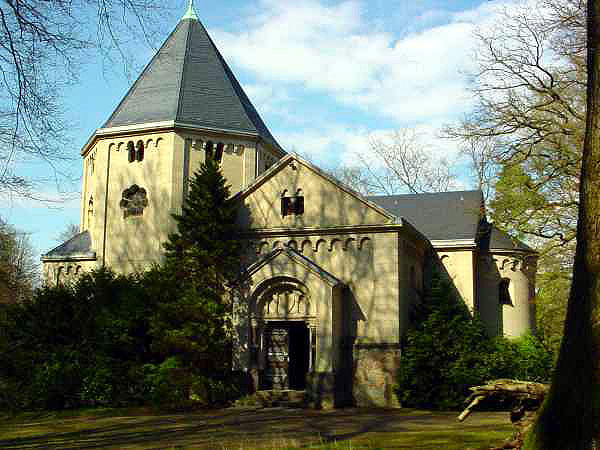
Bismarck Mausoleum, Friedrichsruh

In 1871 Kaiser Wilhelm I of Germany gifted the Sachsenwald forest, adjacent to the Au, to Otto von Bismarck in recognition of his services to the newly unified German nation. Bismarck had a manor house built there, opting to retain the historic name of Friedrichsruh. Bismarck now lies buried in the Bismarck Mausoleum situated there.

Karl Dönitz, the last head of state of Nazi Germany, moved to Aumühle after his release from Spandau Prison in 1956. He lived there until his death in 1980, and was buried in its Waldfriedhof cemetery. The German journalist and politician Olaf von Wrangel also lived in Aumühle.

== Transport ==
Aumühle is the eastern terminus of Hamburg S-Bahn line S2.

== Twin towns ==
Aumühle is twinned with:

- Mortagne-sur-Sèvre, France
- Sleen, today a part of Coevorden, Netherlands
