= Olaf von Wrangel =

German journalist and member of German Bundestag

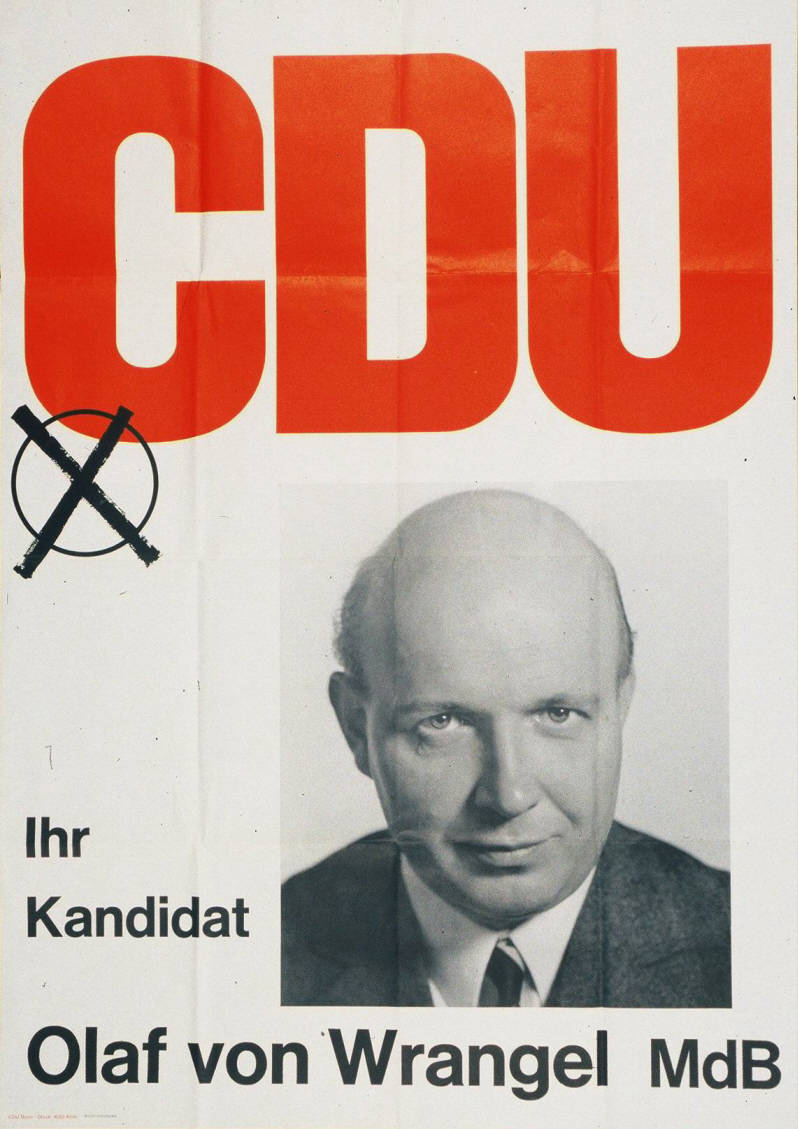
Election for Bundestag, Olaf von Wrangel, 1969

Olaf von Wrangel (July 20 1928, Tallinn (Reval), Estonia – September 29 2009, Aumühle, Germany) was a German journalist, radio- and television correspondent and politician for the Christian Democratic Union of Germany (CDU).

== Life ==
He was a member of Wrangel family. His father was lawyer and landowner Wilhelm von Wrangel and his mother was Annemarie Thomson. His grandfather was German general mayor Nikolaus Alexander von Wrangel. In his childhood his parents left with him at the end of World War II for Reichsgau Wartheland. In 1945, he was a soldier during the fights in Berlin. Wrangel went after World War II to a school in Osterode am Harz. In Hamburg, from 1949 to 1954 he studied history, sociology and law at the University of Hamburg. In 1953 he married Liselotte Mugrauer and they had three daughters. In 1974 Wrangel married Brigitta Lewens.

In 1954, Wrangel became a member of the CDU political party. From 1954 to 1956 he worked for German television station Nordwestdeutscher Rundfunk (NWDR) in Bonn. He became director of NDR studio in Bonn. In 1961, he became editor-in-chief for NDR. In 1962 Wrangel became second programme director for NDR and from 1982 to 1988 was programme director for NDR. From 1965 to 1982 Wrangel was member in German Bundestag.

== Books by Wrangel ==
- Liebeserklärung an die Bundesrepublik, 1971, Seewald Verlag Stuttgart

== Awards ==
- 1974: Komturcross of Order of the Dannebrog
- 1976: Order of Merit of the Federal Republic of Germany
