= Bismarck Mausoleum =

Burial site in northern Germany

Coordinates: 53.5277°N 10.3361°E

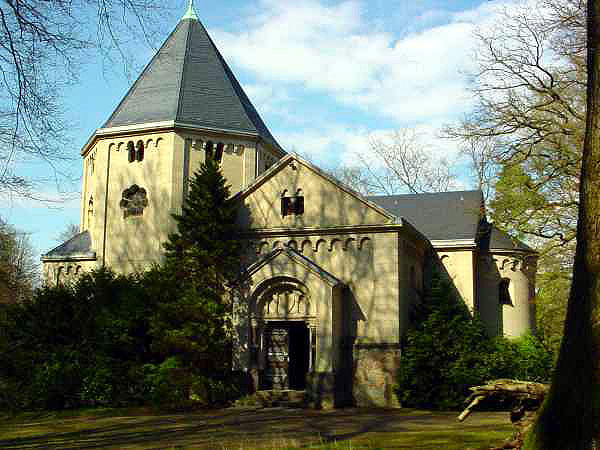
Bismarck Mausoleum in Friedrichsruh

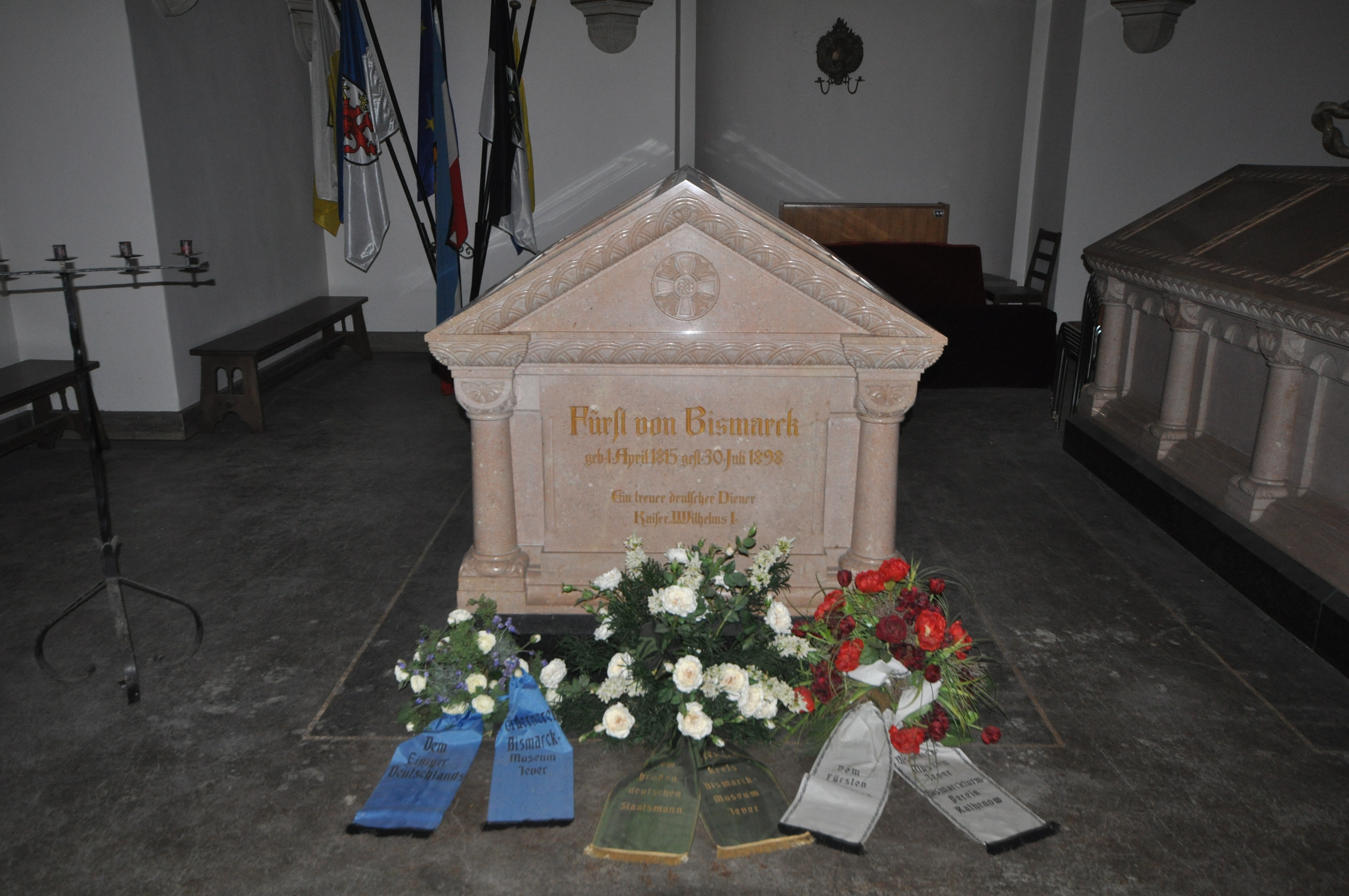
Bismarck's sarcophagus

The Bismarck Mausoleum is the mausoleum of Prince Otto von Bismarck and his wife Johanna von Puttkamer. It is on the Schneckenberg hill just outside Friedrichsruh, Schleswig-Holstein, in northern Germany. Bismarck was the first Chancellor of Germany (1871–1890). The chapel is now a protected monument.

== Description ==
In the upper part of the chapel is the grave of Otto von Bismarck. The epitaph is in his own words: "A faithful German servant of Emperor Wilhelm I." In the lower part, which is not accessible to the public, is the place of the family grave of the Bismarcks. His son, Herbert von Bismarck, and grandson, Otto Christian Archibald von Bismarck, along with their wives, are laid to rest there. In the area around the chapel lies the grave of another grandson, Gottfried Graf von Bismarck-Schönhausen. The chapel and the site are still owned by the Bismarck family, but can be visited and rented for private tours.

== History ==
Under the Gastein Convention negotiated by Bismarck in 1865, Prussia obtained the Duchy of Saxe-Lauenburg from the Austrian Empire. When Prussia established the German Empire in 1871, Bismarck was awarded the Saxony Forest as an endowment by Emperor Wilhelm I. Bismarck built his retirement home there, next to the Berlin–Hamburg Railway. He chose the site so that when he died he could be carried in state from his manor house down the railway to the mausoleum. Initially, Wilhelm II considered entombing Bismarck in the royal crypt of Berlin Cathedral. The poet Theodor Fontane argued against this, with his poem "Wo Bismarck liegen soll" ("Where Bismarck should lie"), which appeared in the newspaper on 3 August 1898, four days after Bismarck's death.

Half a year after his death, on 16 March 1899, the coffins of Otto von Bismarck and his wife, who had been buried at the Bismarck estate in Varzin, Pomerania (now Warcino, Poland), were ceremonially interred in two marble sarcophagi in the Friedrichsruh chapel. This date was chosen because it was the 11th anniversary of the funeral of Kaiser Wilhelm I. The funeral was attended by Wilhelm II, with his wife and a large entourage.

== See also ==
- Georg Ritter von Schönerer, Austrian Pan-Germanist and Bismarck admirer, whose grave is also in Aumühle.
