= Friedrichsruh =

Human settlement in Germany

Coordinates: 53.52946°N 10.34034°E

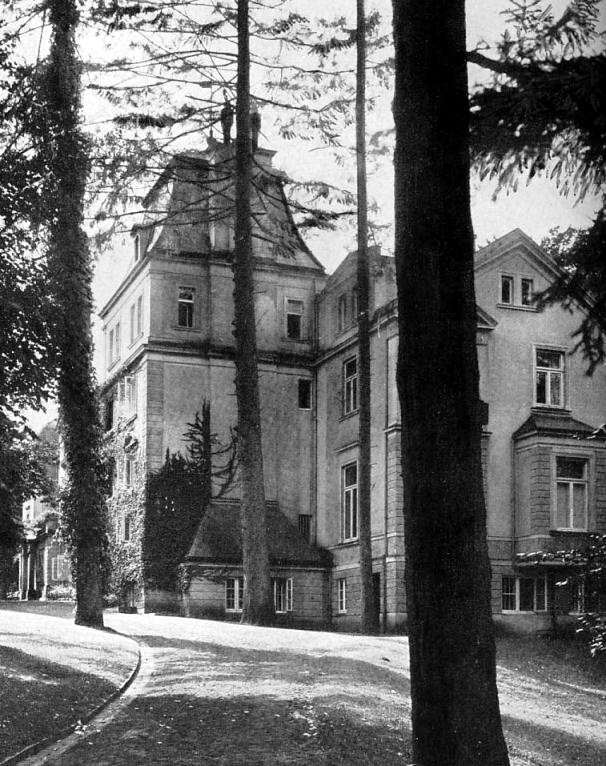
Friedrichsruh manor, 1915

Friedrichsruh (German pronunciation: [fʁiːdʁɪçsˈʁuː]) is a district in the municipality of Aumühle, Herzogtum Lauenburg district, Schleswig-Holstein, in northern Germany. Friedrichsruh manor is known as a residence of the princely House of Bismarck, mainly of Chancellor Otto von Bismarck from 1871 onwards.

== History ==
In the 18th century, the extended Sachsenwald forest in Saxe-Lauenburg east of Hamburg was a favoured hunting ground for Count Frederick of Lippe-Biesterfeld (1706–1781). In 1763 he had a lodge erected in the woods, named Friedrichsruh ("Frederick's Rest"), which upon his death changed hands several times. In the early 19th century, the premises were rebuilt as a country inn and guesthouse, which after the opening of the Hamburg-Berlin railway line running nearby became a popular destination for Hamburg citizens.

After the victory over France and the German unification of 1871, Chancellor Otto von Bismarck received the Sachsenwald estates as a present from Emperor William I. Bismarck had the former inn restored as a manor house and retained the name of Friedrichsruh. After his death he was entombed in the Bismarck Mausoleum on the Schneckenberg hill, just outside Friedrichsruh, on 16 March 1899.

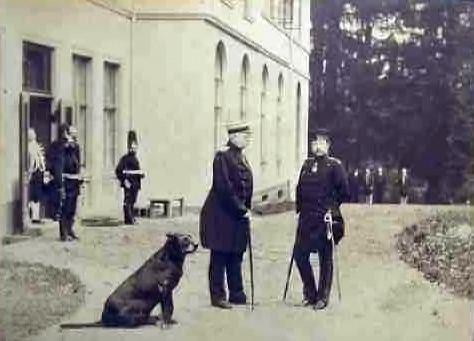
Bismarck and Emperor William II in Friedrichsruh (1888)

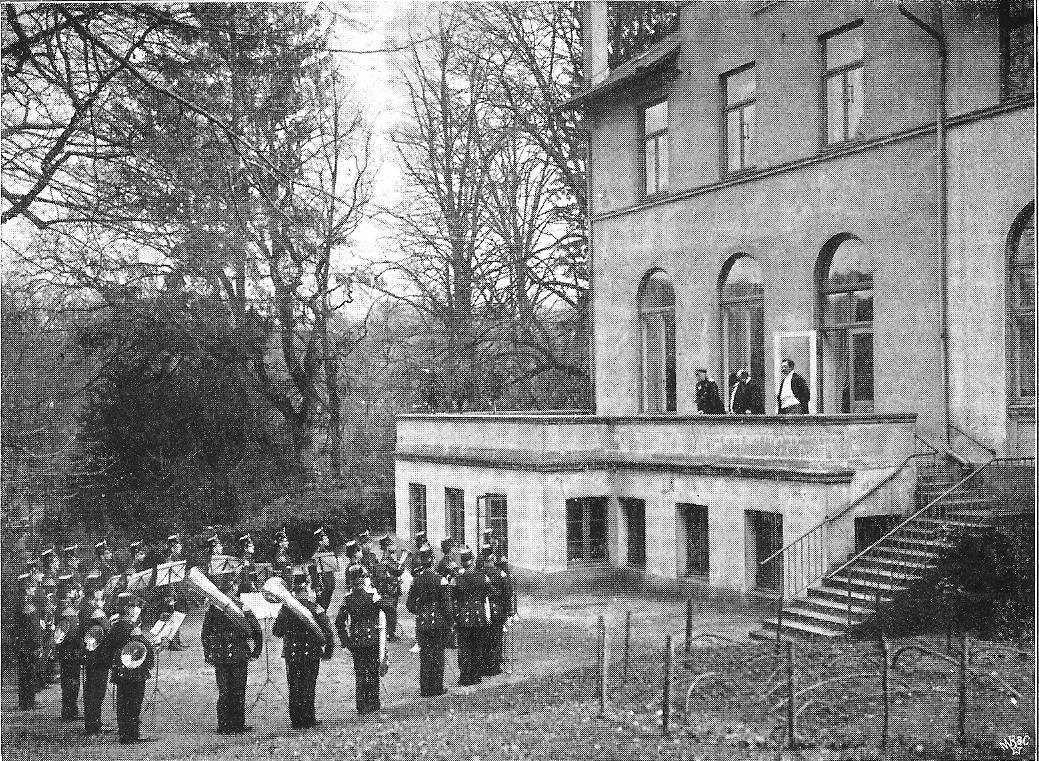
Bismarck receives the marching band of the Lauenburgisches Jäger-Bataillon Nr. 9 (1902)

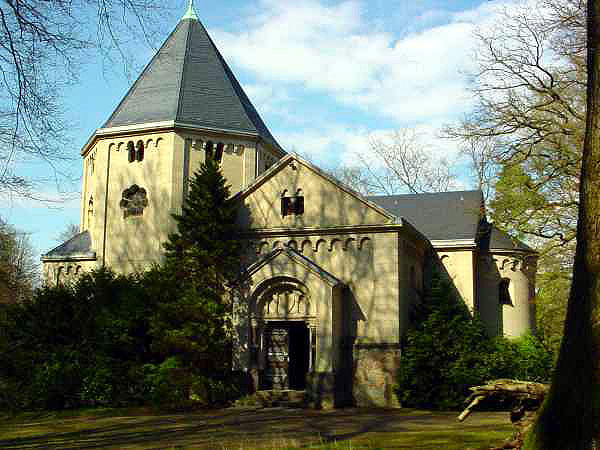
Bismarck Mausoleum Friedrichsruh

In the last days of World War II, in 1945, Friedrichsruh manor was destroyed during a RAF raid due to the (false) rumor that Heinrich Himmler was hiding there. Actually, it served as the headquarters of the Swedish White Buses rescue programme led by Folke Bernadotte, clearly visible by Red Cross markings on its roof. After the war, the premises were rebuilt at the behest of Otto Christian Archibald von Bismarck (1897–1975).

His son, Prince Ferdinand von Bismarck, managed the estate until his death in 2013, while his wife Elisabeth beautified the park including greenhouses with butterflies. They received guests such as King Willem-Alexander of the Netherlands, a godson of Prince Ferdinand, his parents Prince Claus and Queen Beatrix, the kings Carl XVI Gustaf of Sweden and Juan Carlos I of Spain with their wives, as well as the Duke and Duchess of Windsor at Friedrichsruh.

The German press reported that it is disputed if Prince Ferdinand left the estate to his third son Count Gregor von Bismarck-Schönhausen (b. 1964) due to his mental illness. Today the managed forest area of Sachsenwald amounts to about 6,000 hectares, of which 4,500 still belong to the House of Bismarck. The gardens with the butterfly houses are open to the public, as are the Bismarck Museum and the Bismarck Mausoleum.

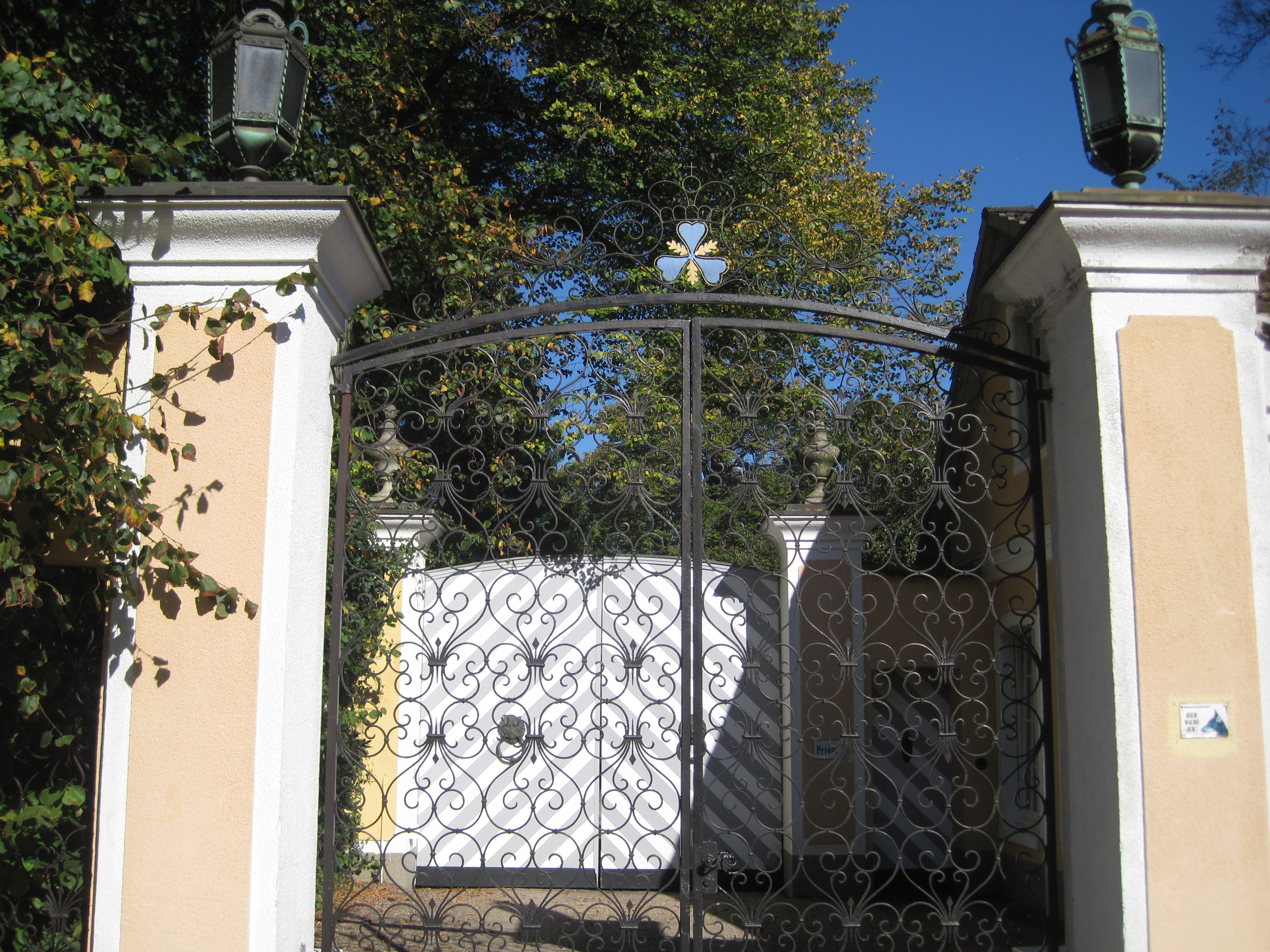
Gate to the manor house

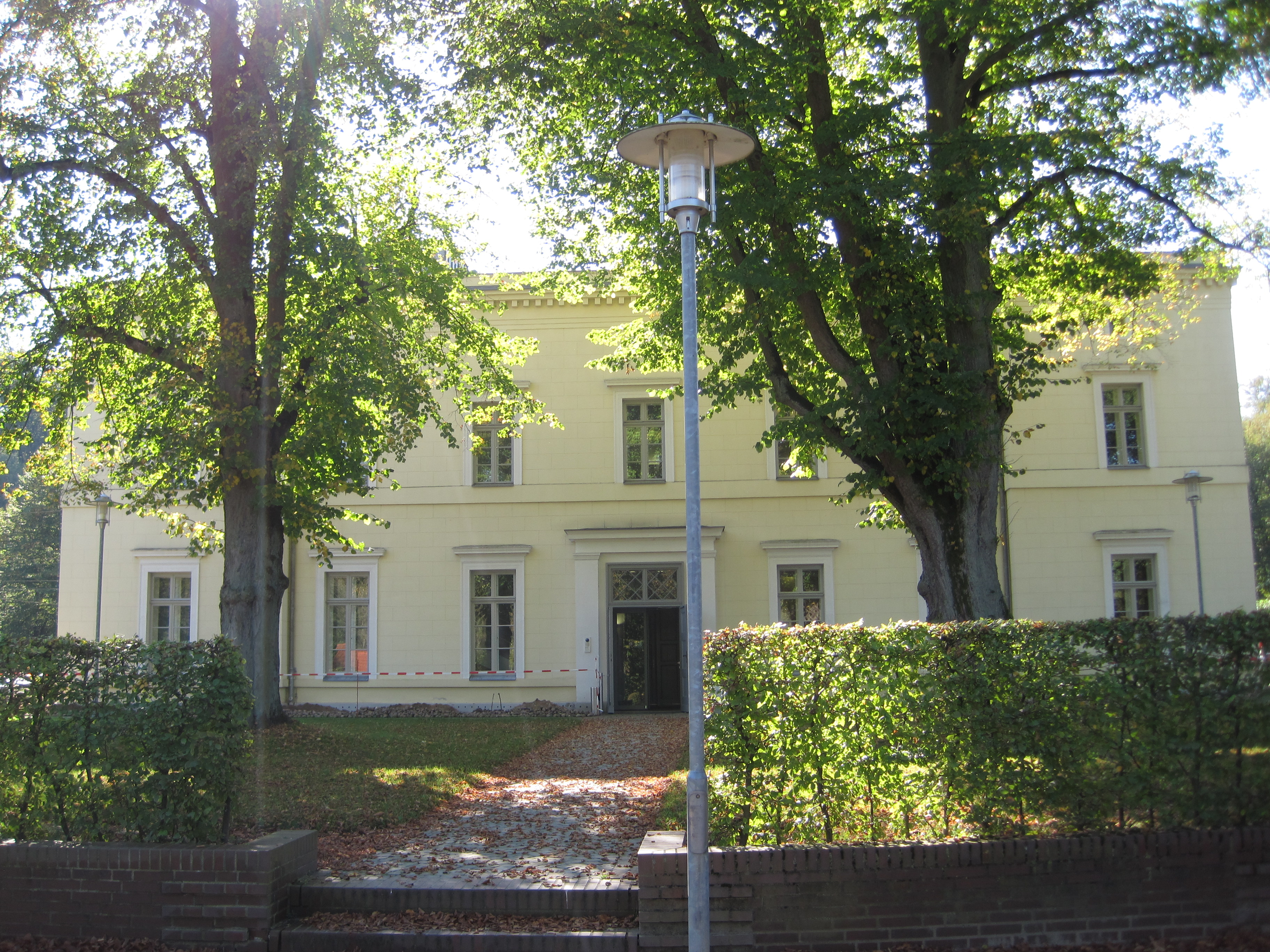
Otto-von-Bismarck Foundation Friedrichsruh

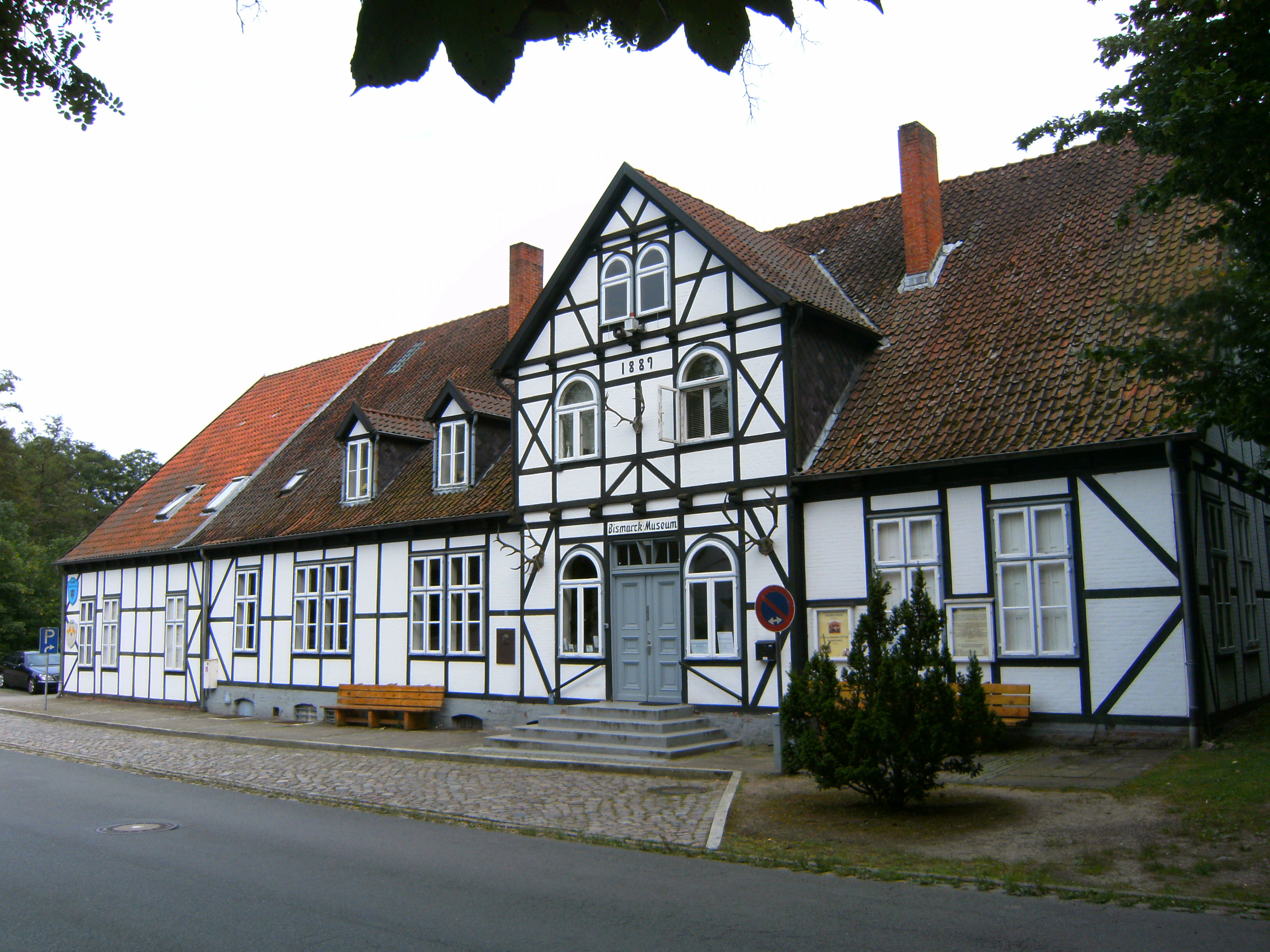
Bismarck-Museum Friedrichsruh

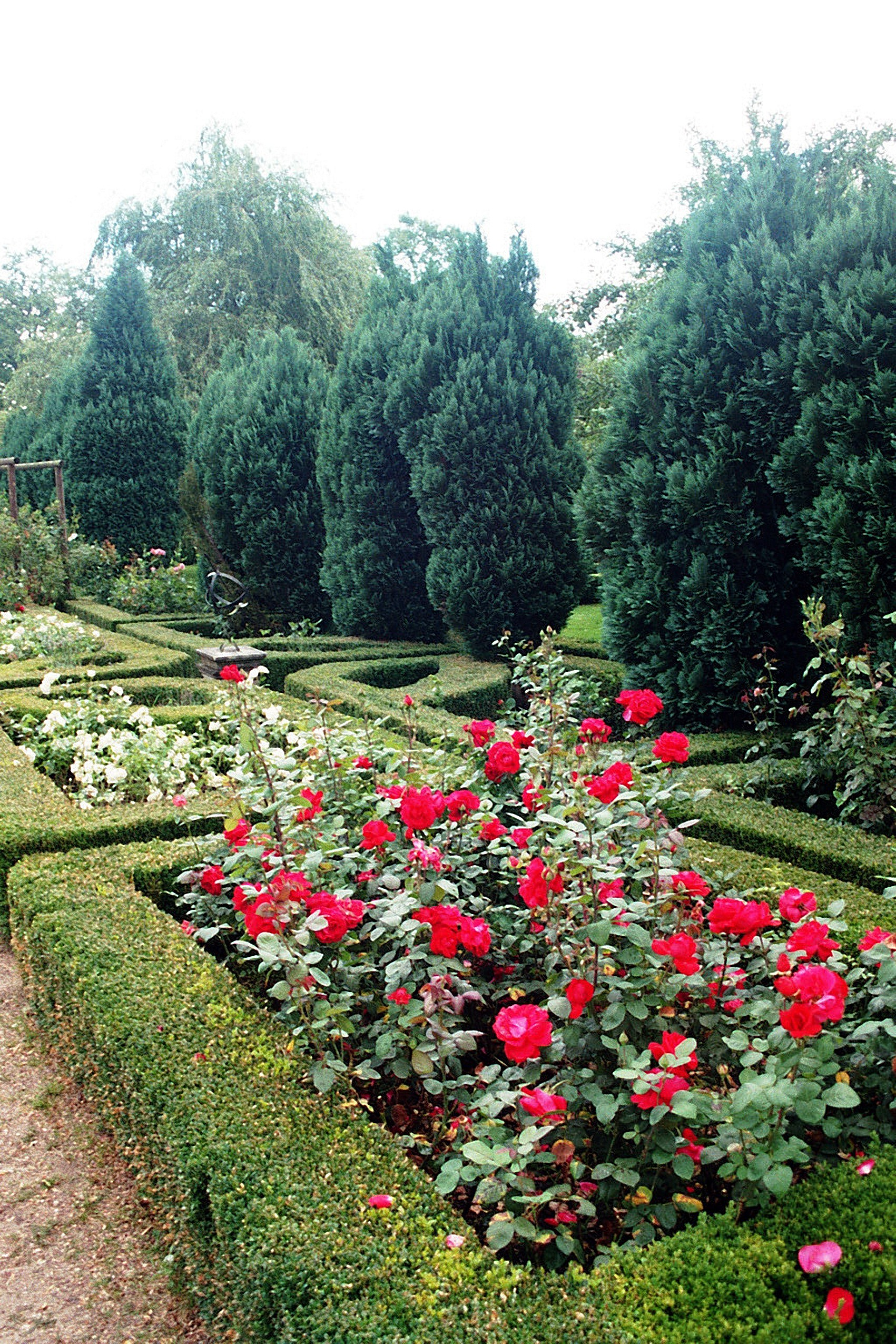
Rose Garden

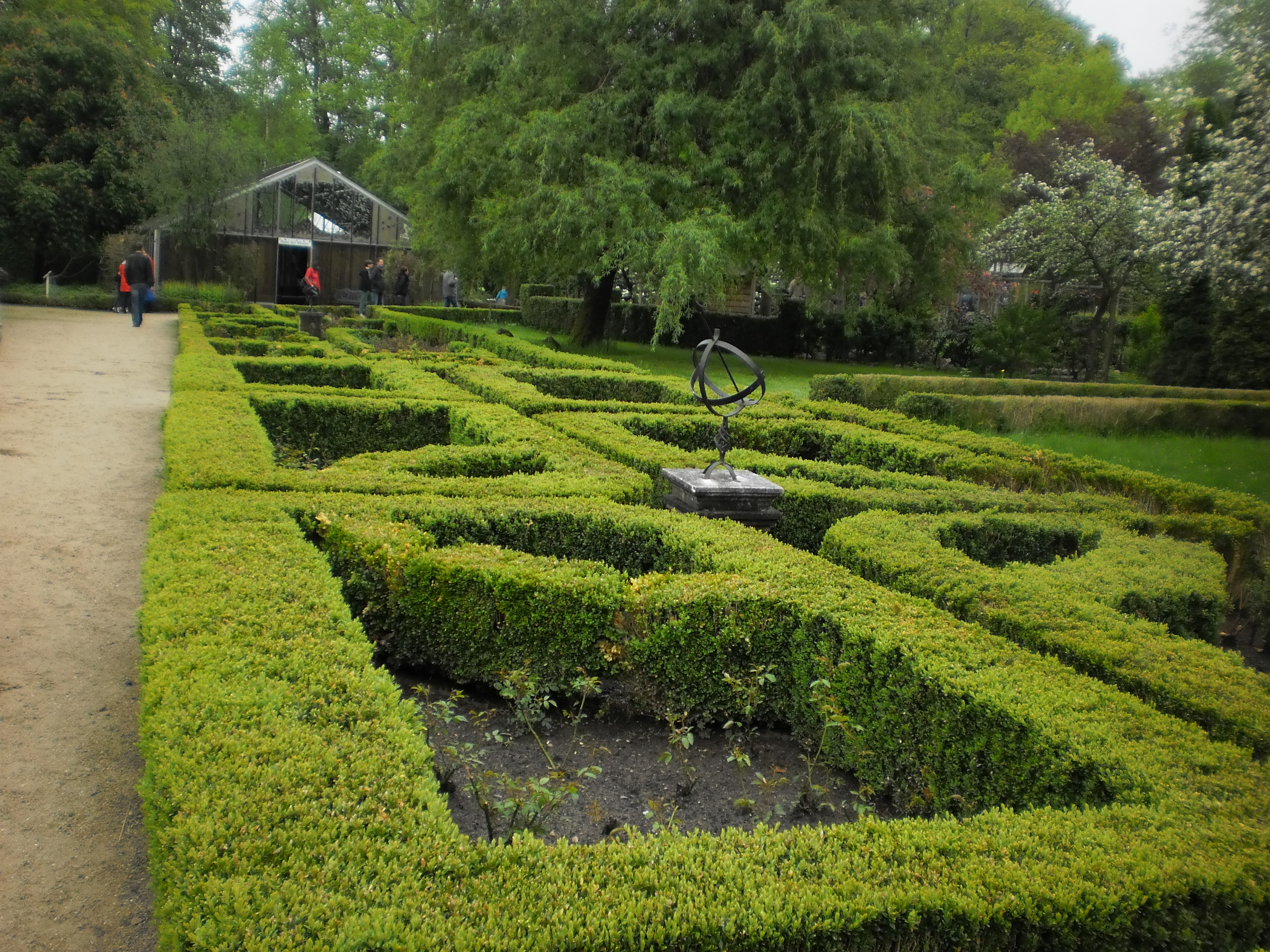
Butterfly Garden

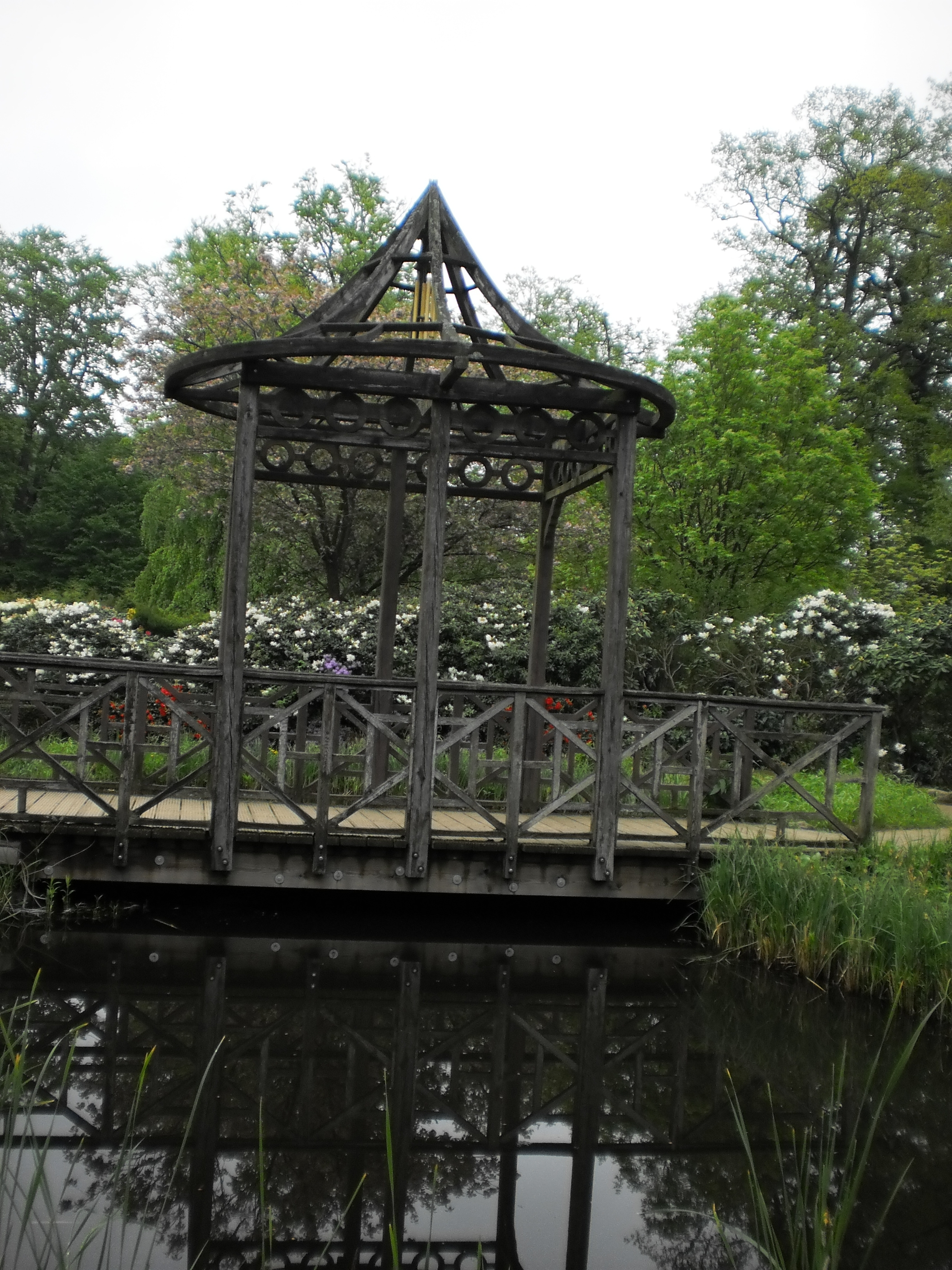
Bridge in the park
