= Sachsenwald =

Forest near Hamburg, Germany

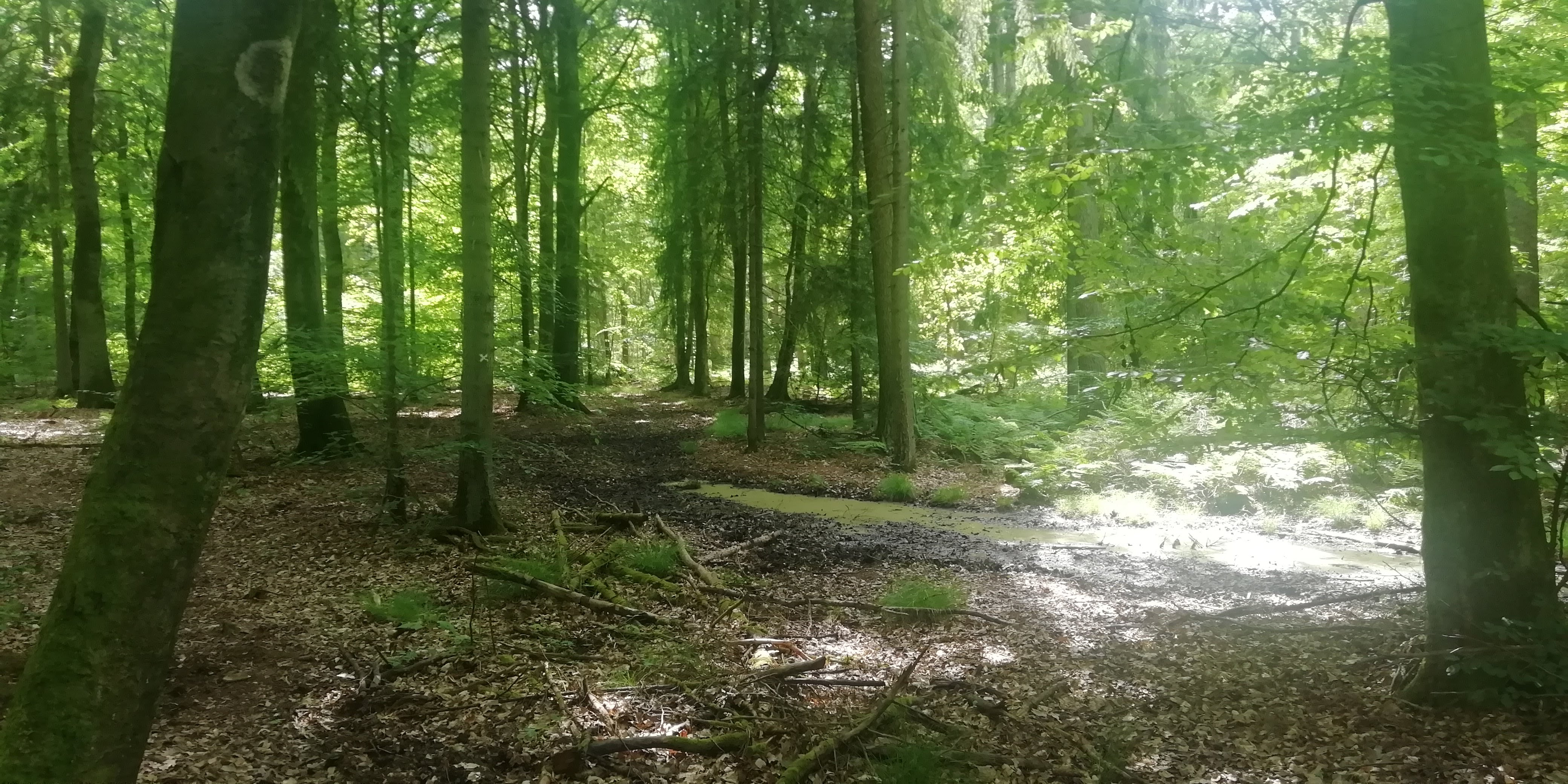

- Sachsenwald in the Duchy of Lauenburg. Amt Hohe Elbgeest shown in light red.

Geography
- Location: Germany, Schleswig-Holstein, Duchy of Lauenburg
- Coordinates: 53°32′N 10°22′E

Administration
- Owner: 67% Bismarck Family; 33% Eberhart von Rantzau
- Website: www.sachsenwald.de

The Sachsenwald (German pronunciation: [ˈzaksn̩valt]) is a forest near Hamburg, Germany. The forest derives its name, which can be translated as Saxon woods or Saxony forest, from being located in the former Duchy of Saxe-Lauenburg, which itself is a part of the greater Lower Saxony region as defined by the former Duchy of Saxony. Until 2026, the forest was an unincorporated area in the district of Herzogtum Lauenburg (Duchy of Lauenburg) in Schleswig-Holstein. The Sachsenwald has an area of 68 km^{2} (26 mi^{2}) and is the largest contiguous forest area in Schleswig-Holstein.

Large parts of the forest belong to the House of Bismarck since 1871, who still have their headquarters at Friedrichsruh Castle on the edge of the Sachsenwald.

== History ==
The Sachsenwald are the remnants of the ancient old-growth forest which used to cover most of northern Germany.

The Sachsenwald was given to Otto von Bismarck in 1871 by Wilhelm I in recognition of his services to the founding of the German Empire. The forest area amounts to about 6,000 hectares (15,000 acres), of which 4,500 still belong to the House of Bismarck, residing at Friedrichsruh. From 1989 until 2003, Ferdinand von Bismarck sold 2,250 hectares (roughly one third) to the shipowner Eberhart von Rantzau, owner of the Deutsche Afrika-Linien.

The Red Army Faction (RAF) built a secret weapons depot in the Sachsenwald named Daphne, where a revolver, machine guns, and fake IDs were stored. On 16 November 1982, Christian Klar, an RAF-member and terrorist, would be arrested near Friedrichsruh in the Sachsenwald while on his way to the, at that point known, depot.

== Politics ==
The Sachsenwald was part of the collective municipality (Amt) of Aumühle-Wohltorf until 2008, when Aumühle-Wohltorf was disbanded and all territories in it folded into the Amt Hohe Elbgeest, which the Sachsenwald remains a part of to this day.

Due to being uninhabited, the Sachsenwald has no municipal government. It is however formally administered and represented by a Gutsvorsteher (roughly 'estate manager'), the office of which being equal to that of mayor. Due to being an equal position to mayor, the Gutsvorsteher is a nonvoting member of the Amt's board (Amtsausschuss). Gutsvorsteher is Andreas Illgner, an employee of Gregor von Bismarck.

=== Alleged tax haven ===
Due to the special historical status of the forest area, Georg von Bismarck has allegedly used the Sachsenwald as a tax haven. The municipal trade tax rate – set by a Gutsvorsteher nominated by von Bismarck – has remained unchanged since 1958 at a rate about half that of nearby Hamburg. In October 2024, it was reported that at least 21 firms were registered in Sachsenwald, including several real estate companies, an investment consultancy, a trust company, and more than ten subsidiaries of international companies. All of these companies officially reside in von Bismarck's hut, including, reportedly, companies with millions of euros in annual revenue. Journalists have raised serious doubts whether any business was taking place in the forest hut, which could suggest the companies have been evading taxes, as municipal trade taxes are due to the municipality in which the economic activity takes place.

== Religion ==
The Sachsenwald was the meeting place of the Sachsenwald Coven, the first ever Wiccan Coven in Germany. It was established during imbolc 1969 in Hamburg, but exclusively met in the Sachsenwald until 2013. Due to most members of the coven living in Hamburg and wanting a shorter journey to meetings, the coven would change its policy and also allow meetings to take place in Hamburg. After several years of almost exclusively meeting in Hamburg, the coven would change its name to Coven Hamburg on imbolc 2017.

== Gallery ==
=== Photos ===
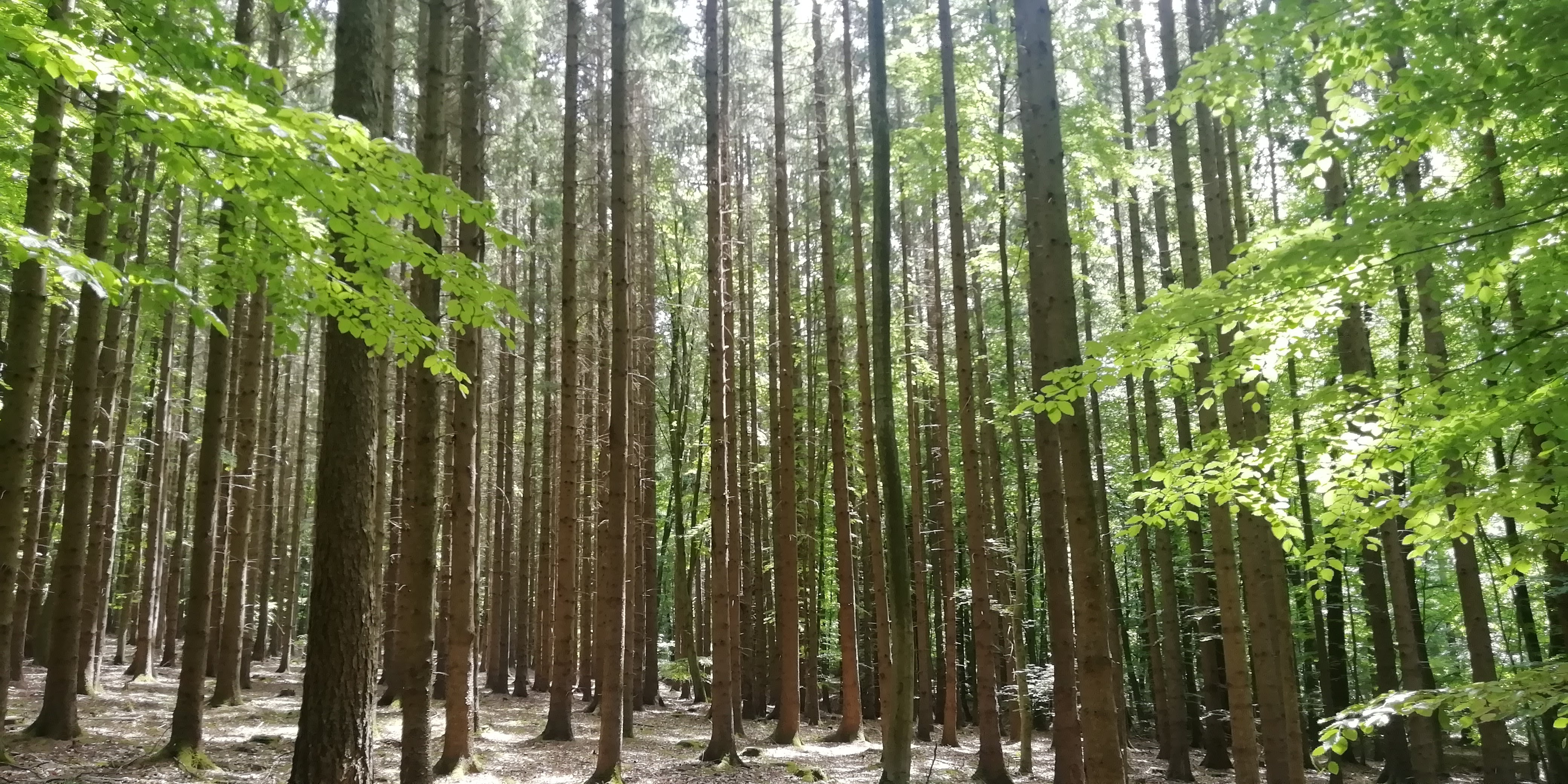
Trees in the western Sachsenwald

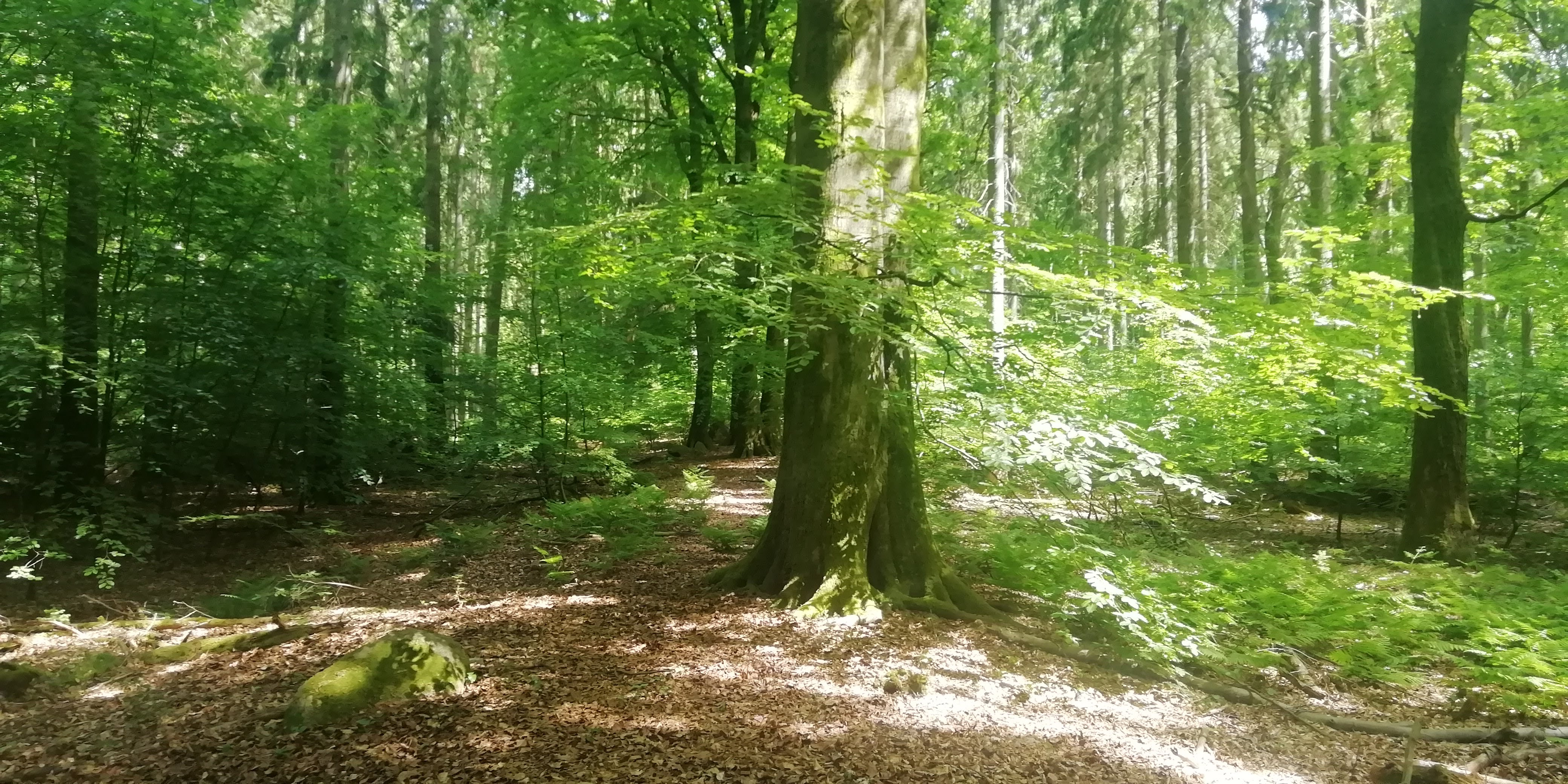
Long barrow in the western Sachsenwald

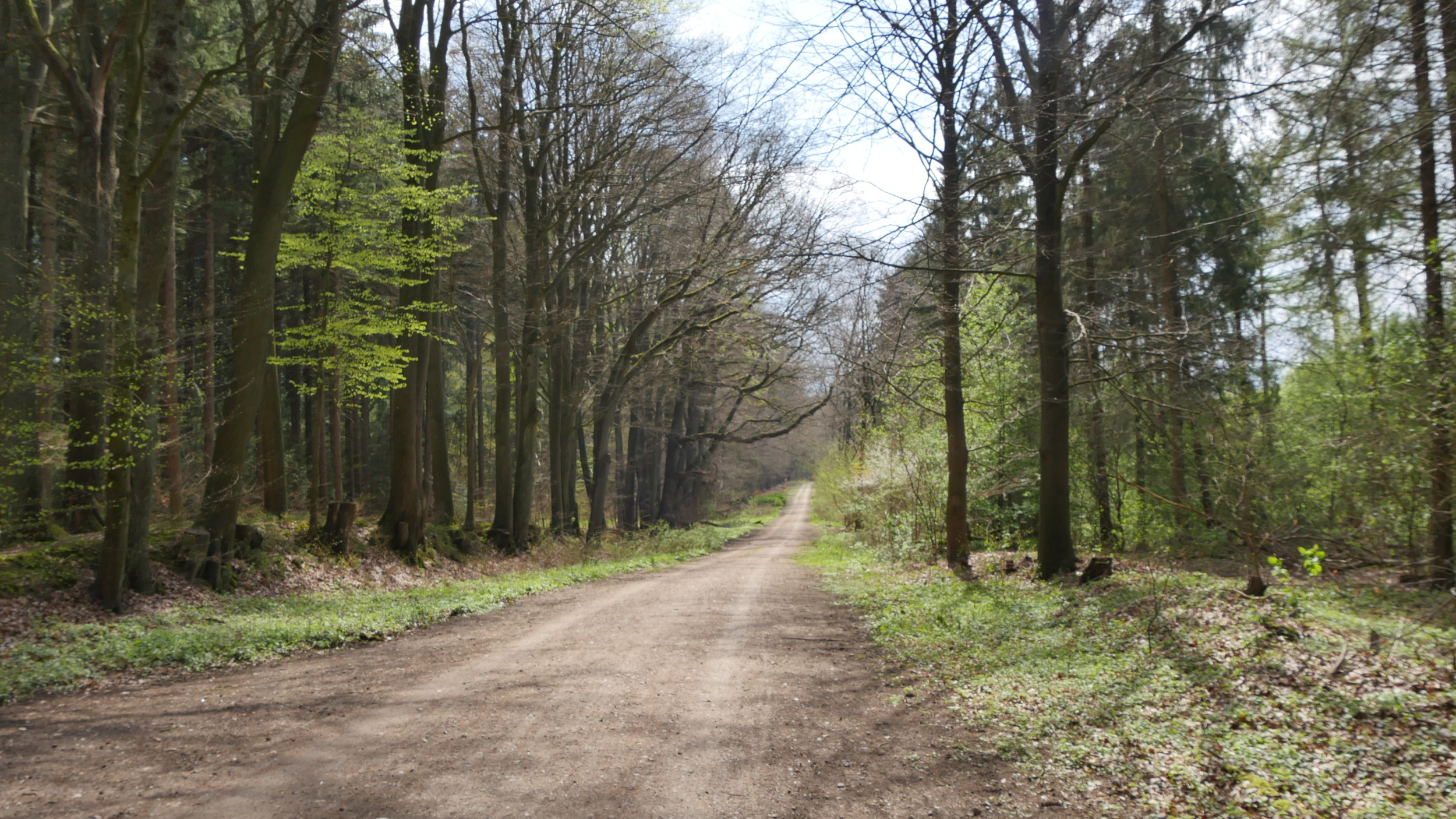
Wentorfer Lohe next to the Sachsenwald

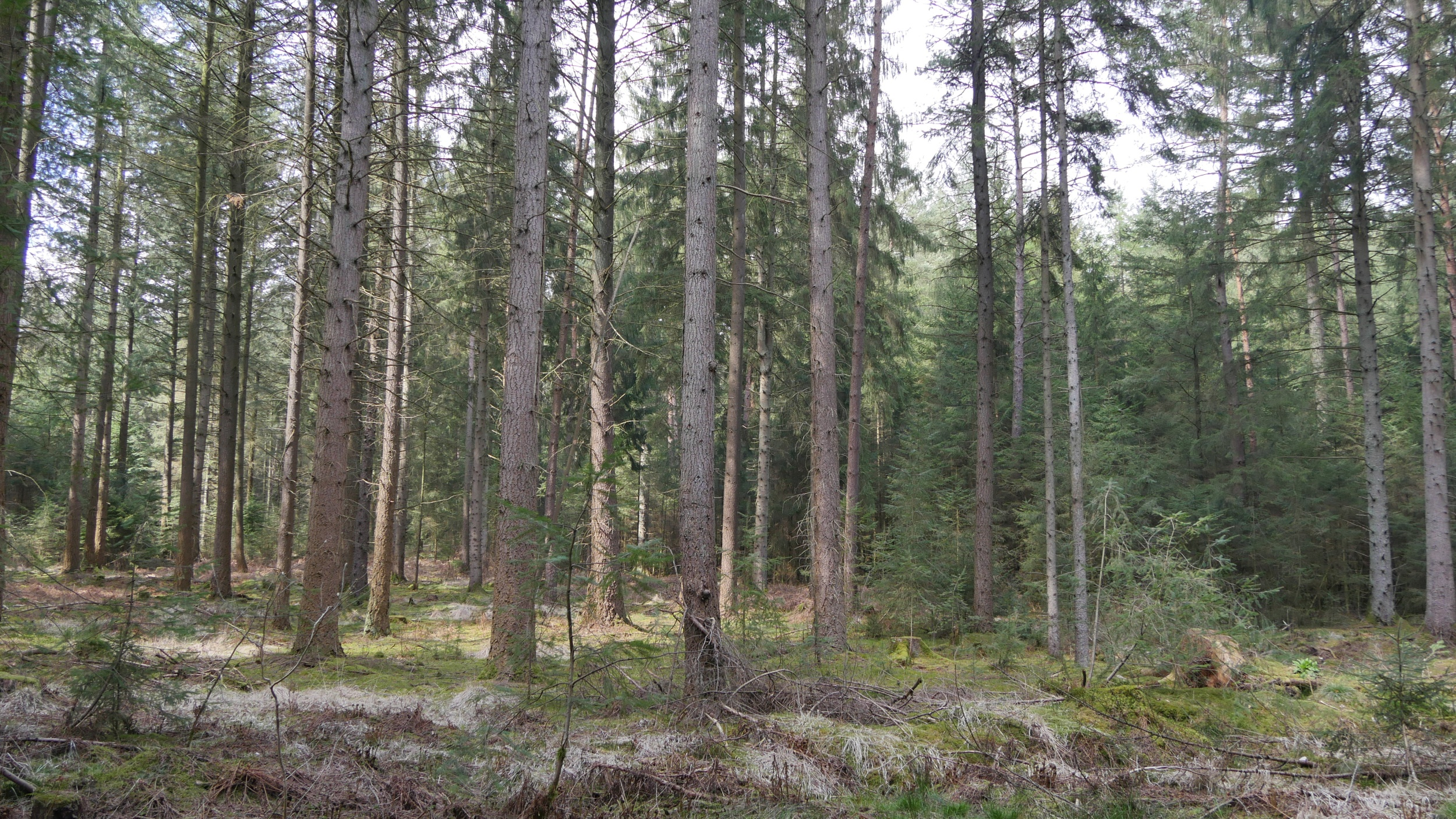
Sachsenwald by Aumühle

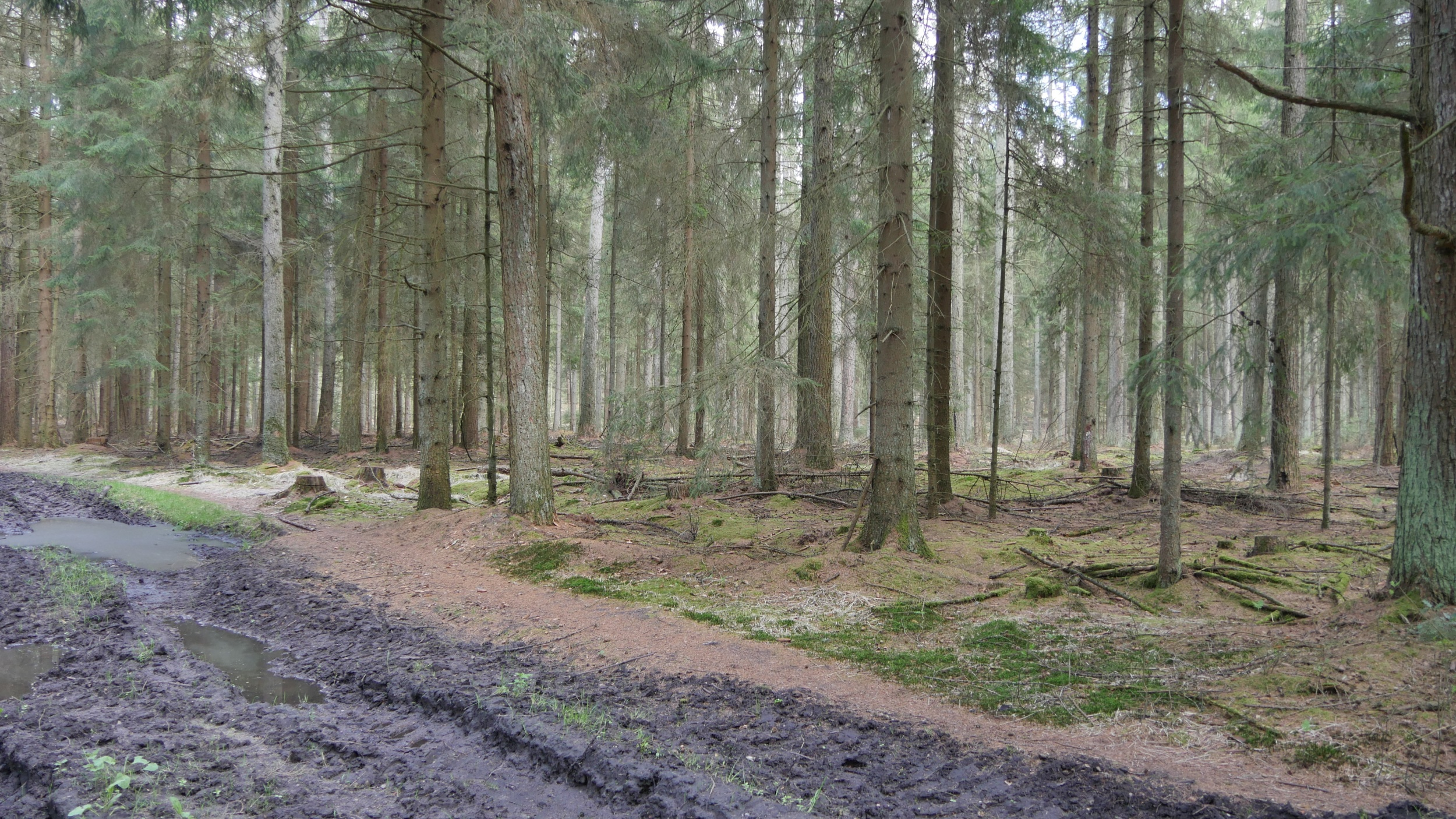
Sachsenwald by Aumühle

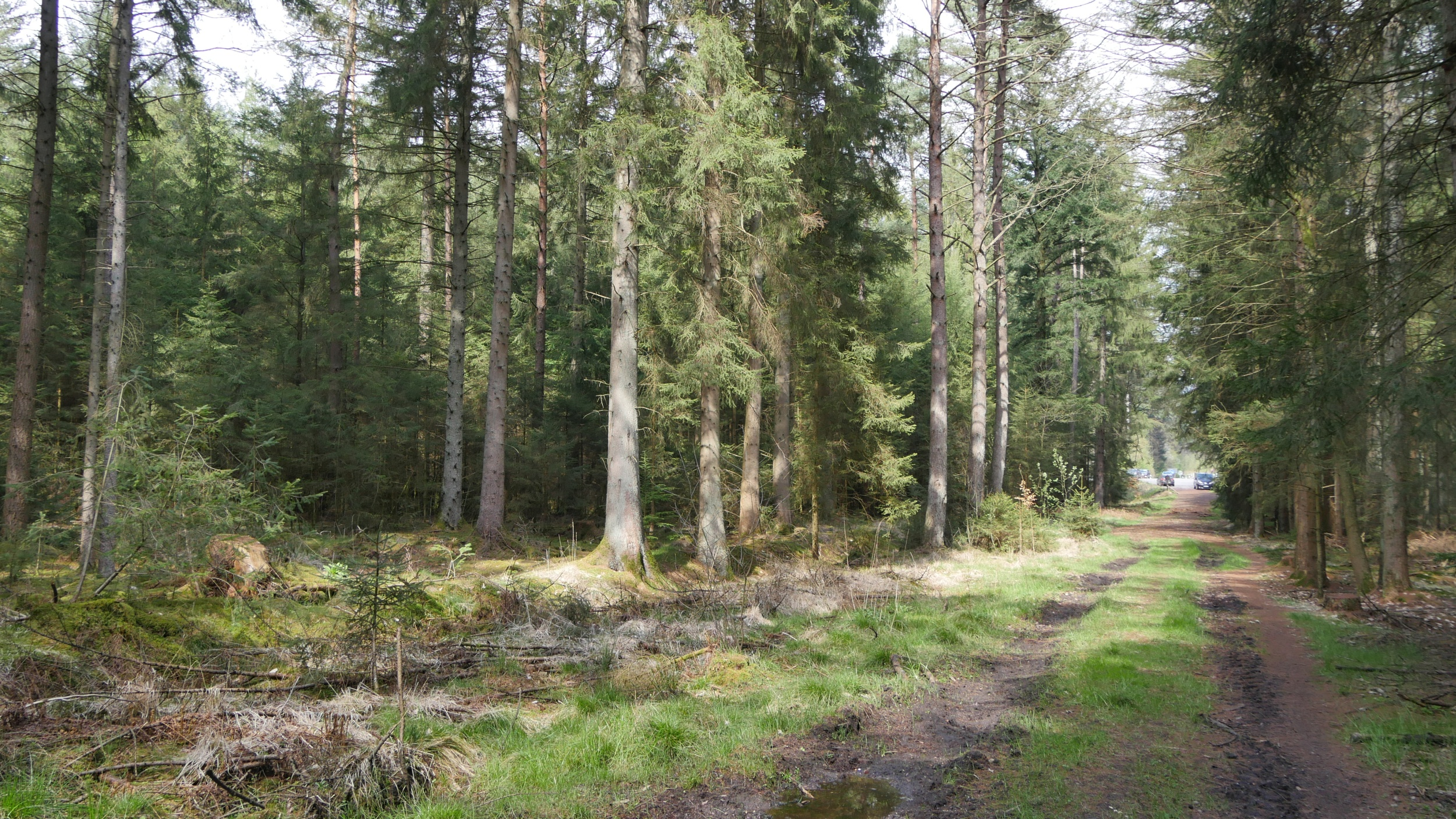
Sachsenwald by Aumühle

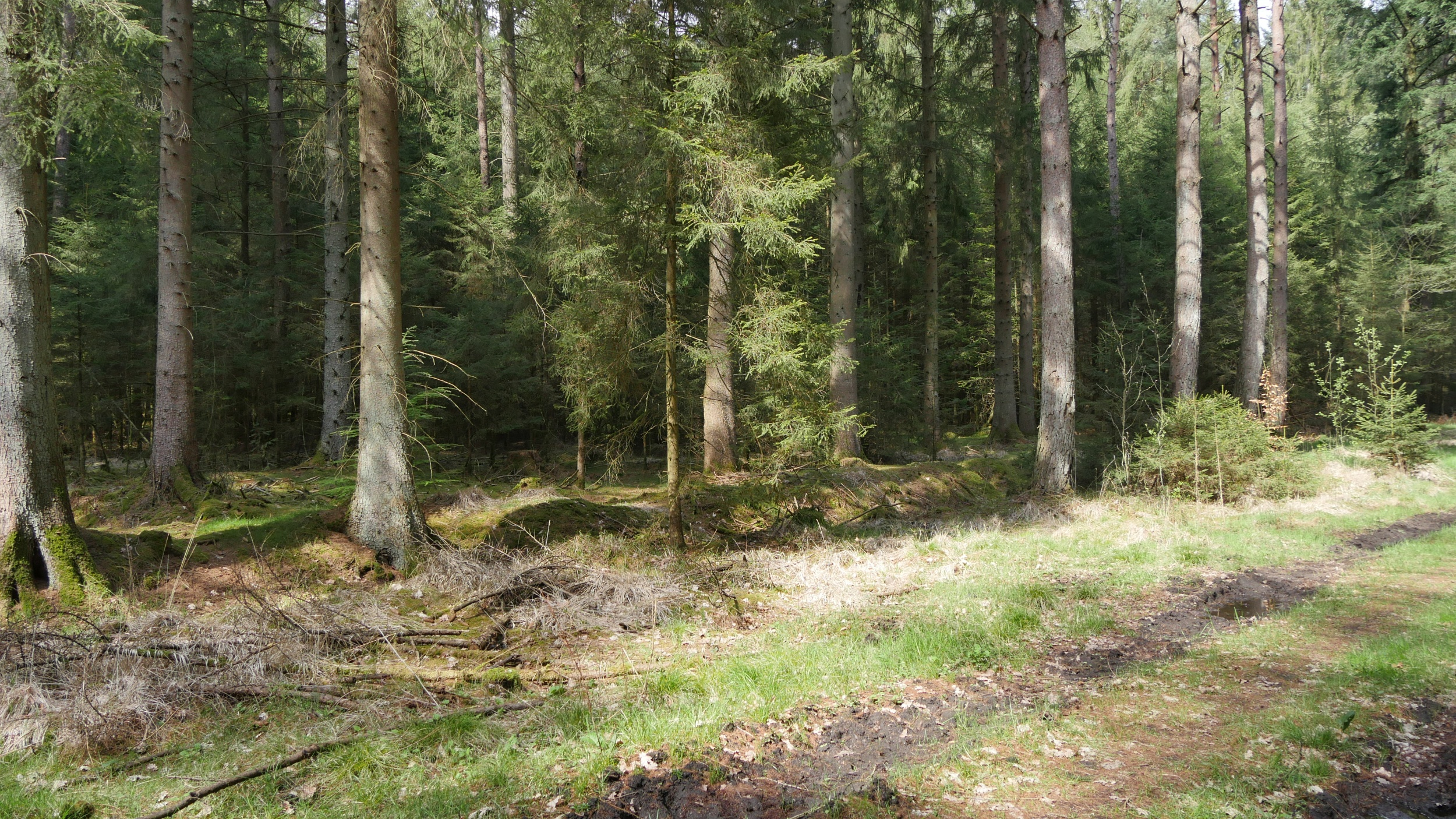
Sachsenwald by Aumühle

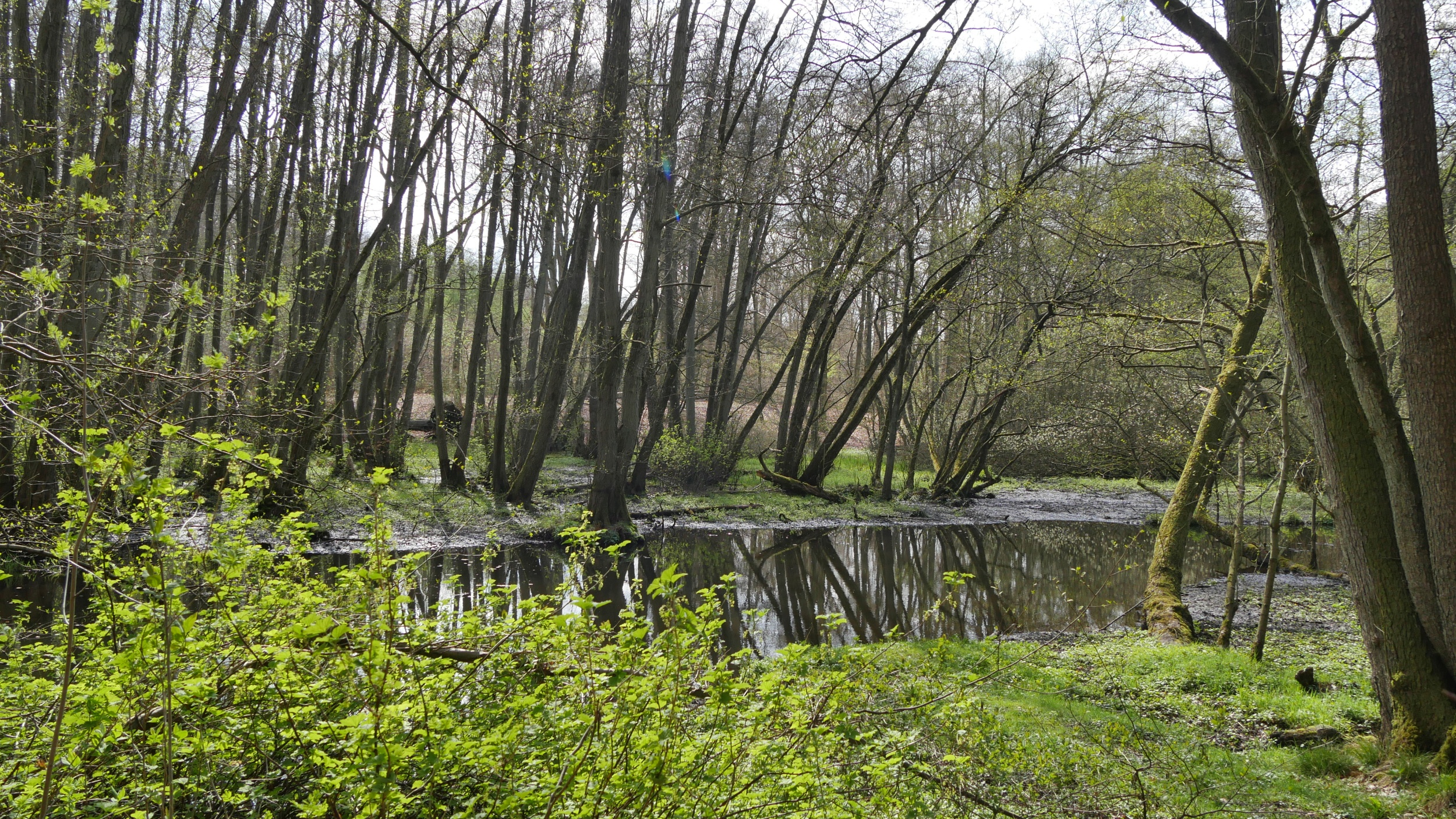
Schwarze Au in the Sachsenwald by Aumühle

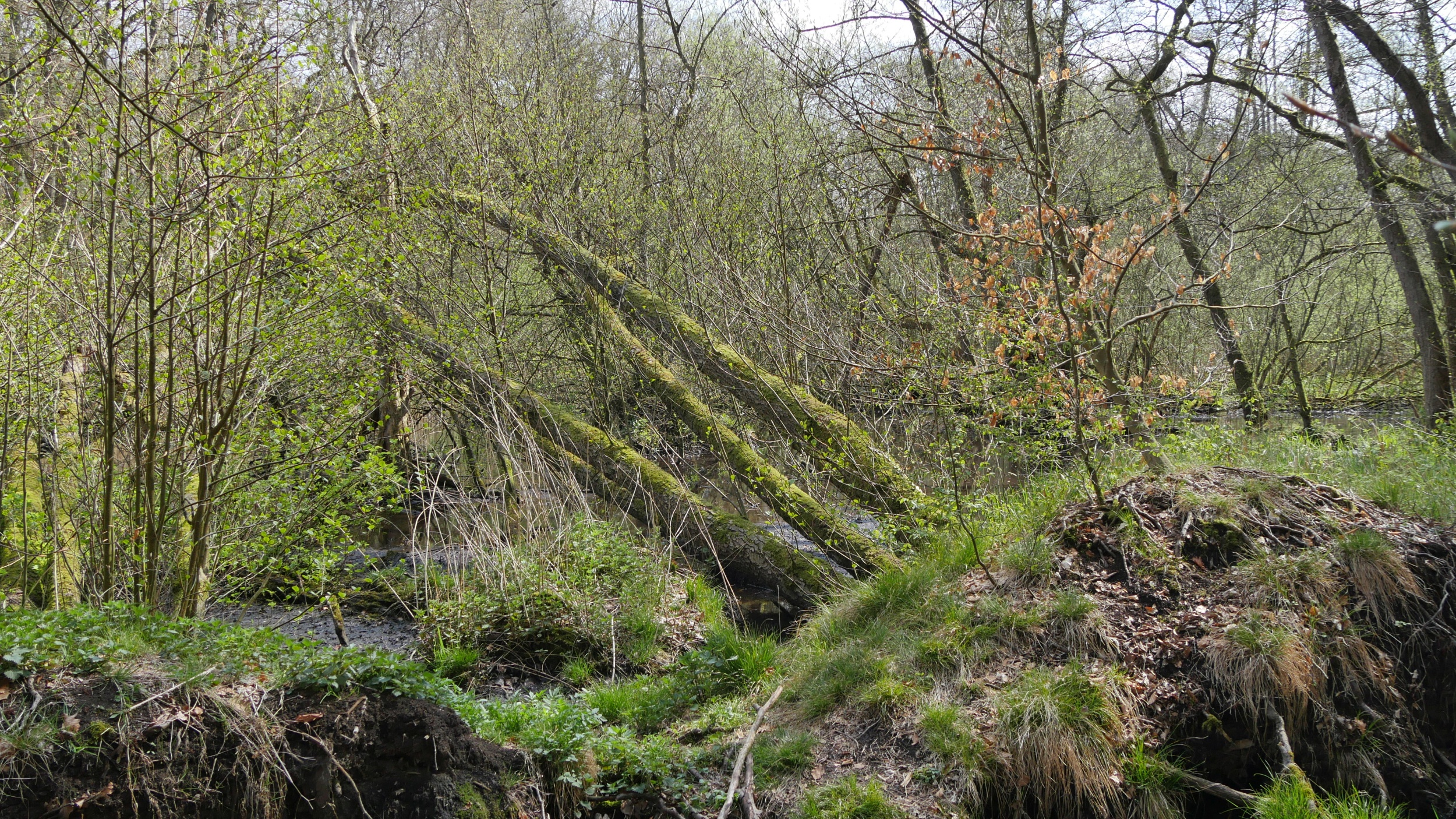
Schwarze Au in the Sachsenwald by Aumühle

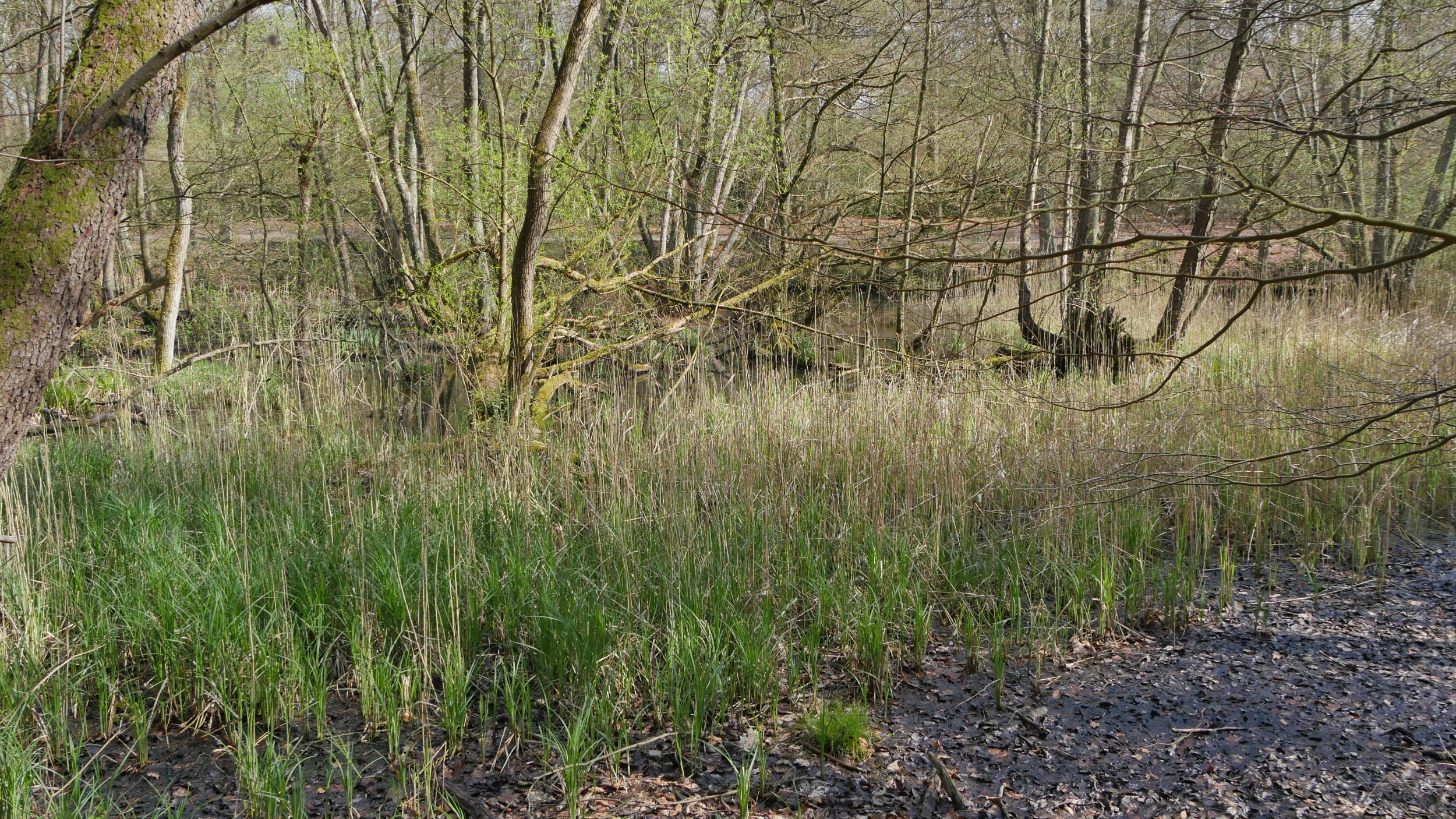
Schwarze Au in the Sachsenwald by Aumühle

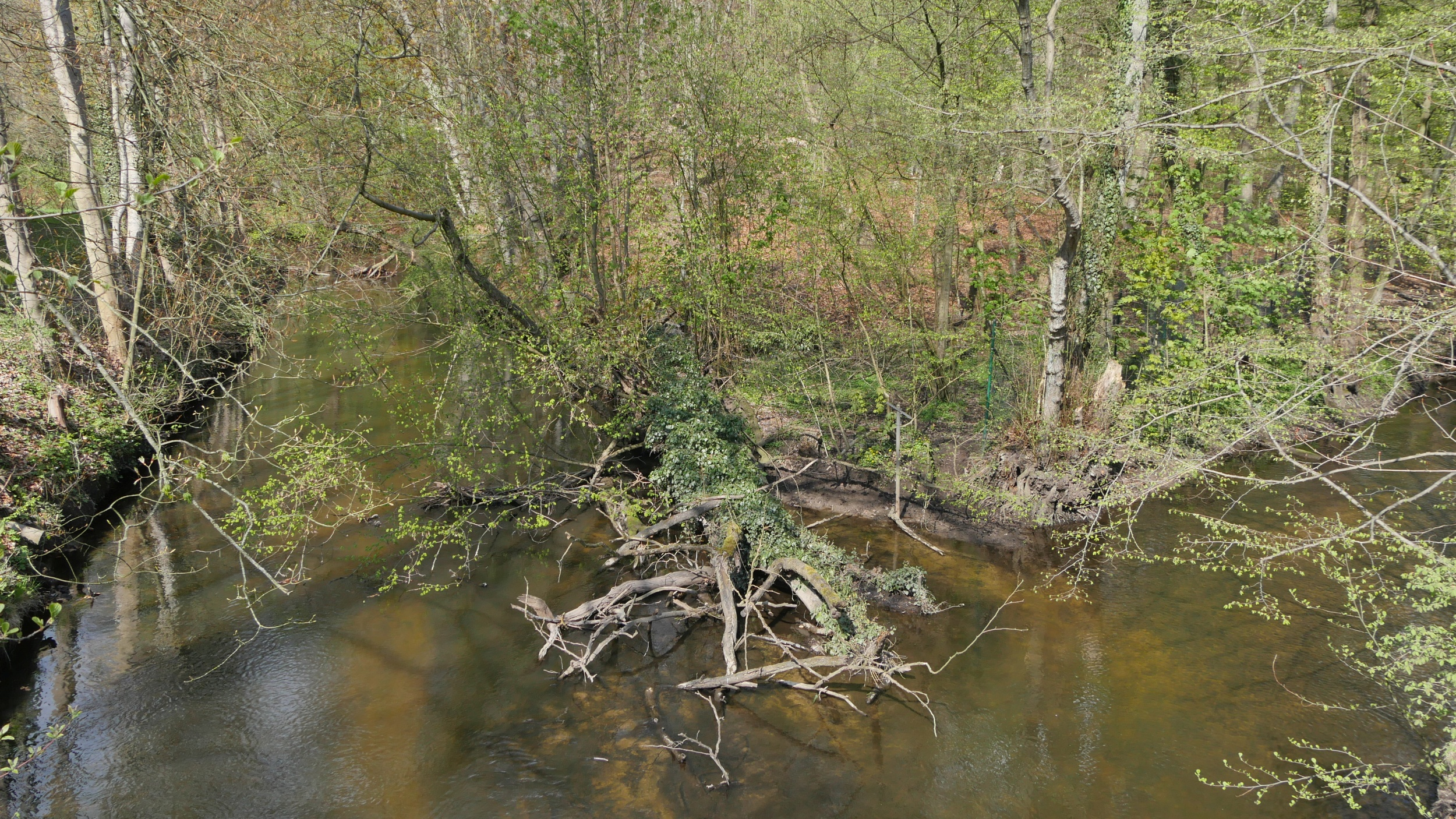
Schwarze Au flowing into the Bille in the Sachsenwald

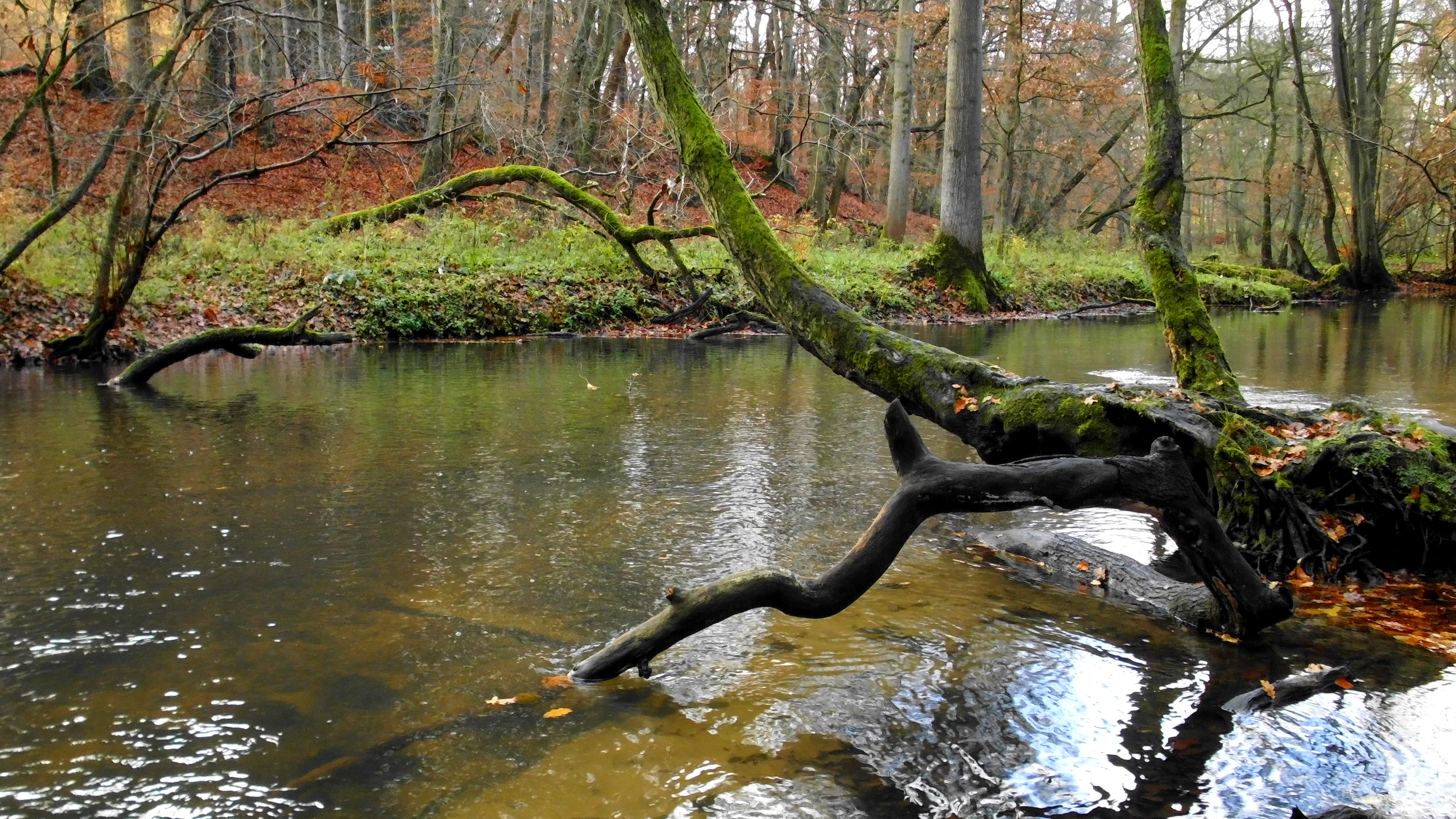
Bille in the Billetal nature reserve in the Sachsenwald

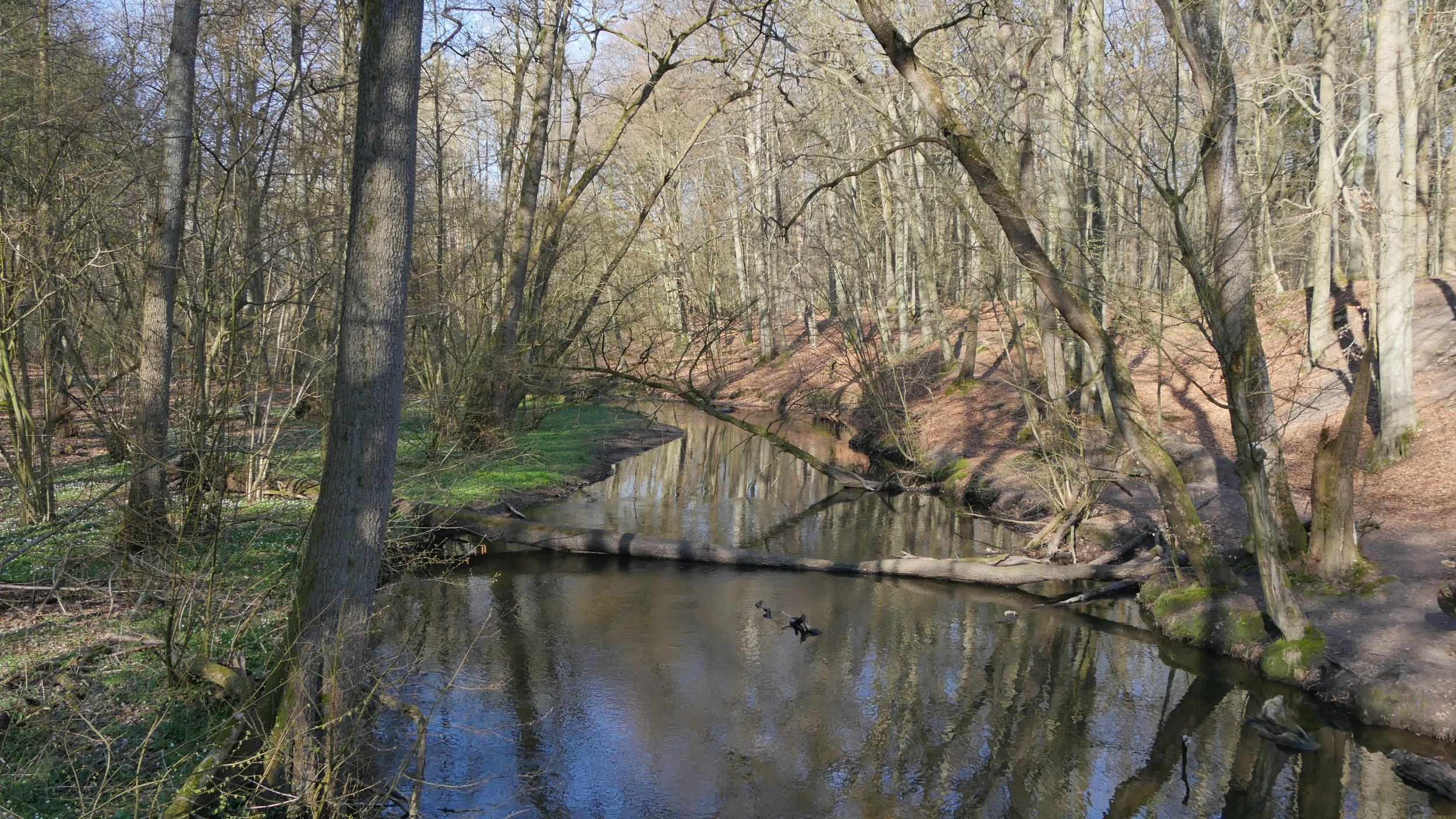
Bille flowing through the Sachsenwald

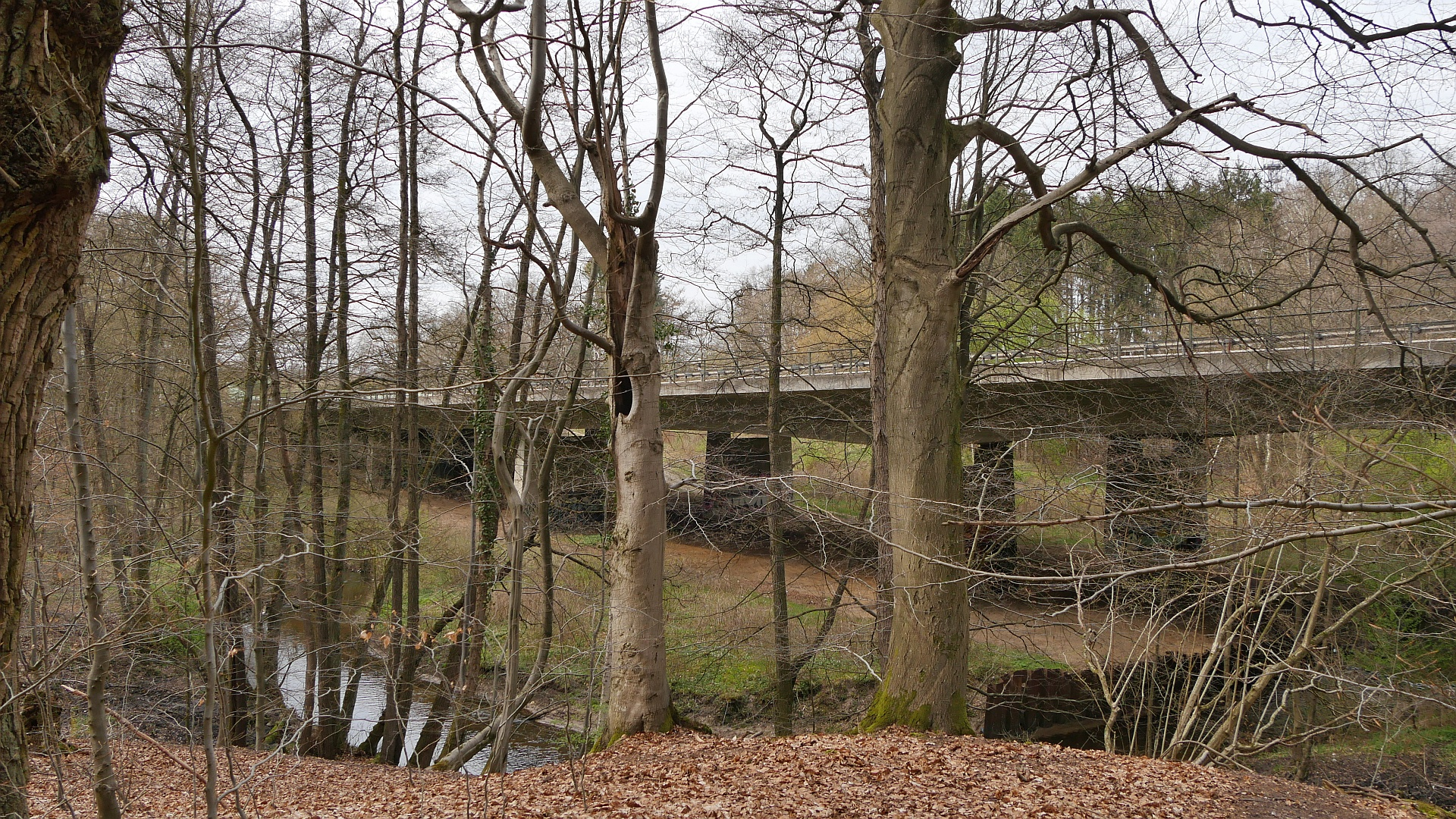
Bundesautobahn 24 bridge over the Bille in the Sachsenwald

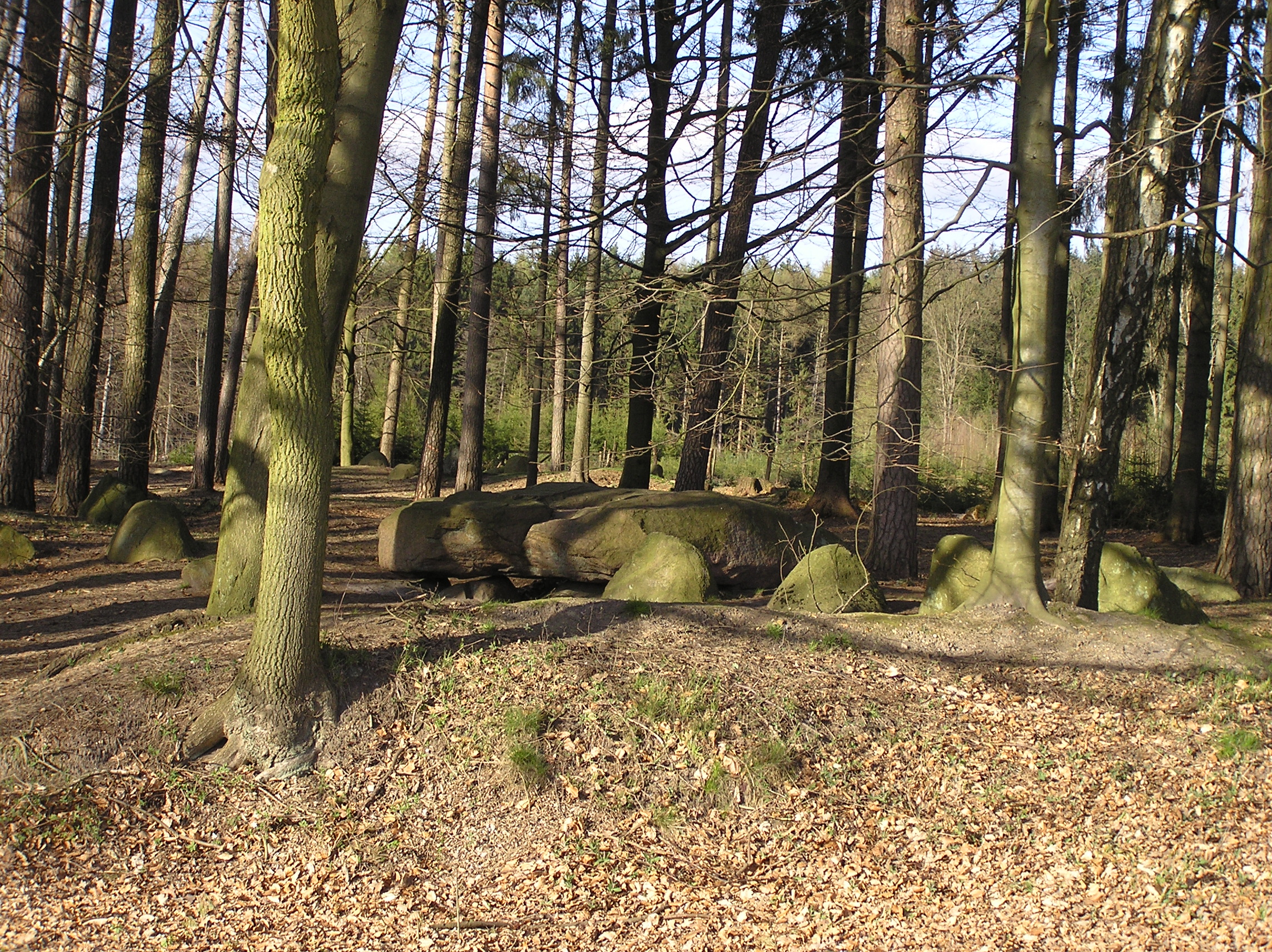
Dassendorf Riesenbett in the southern Sachsenwald

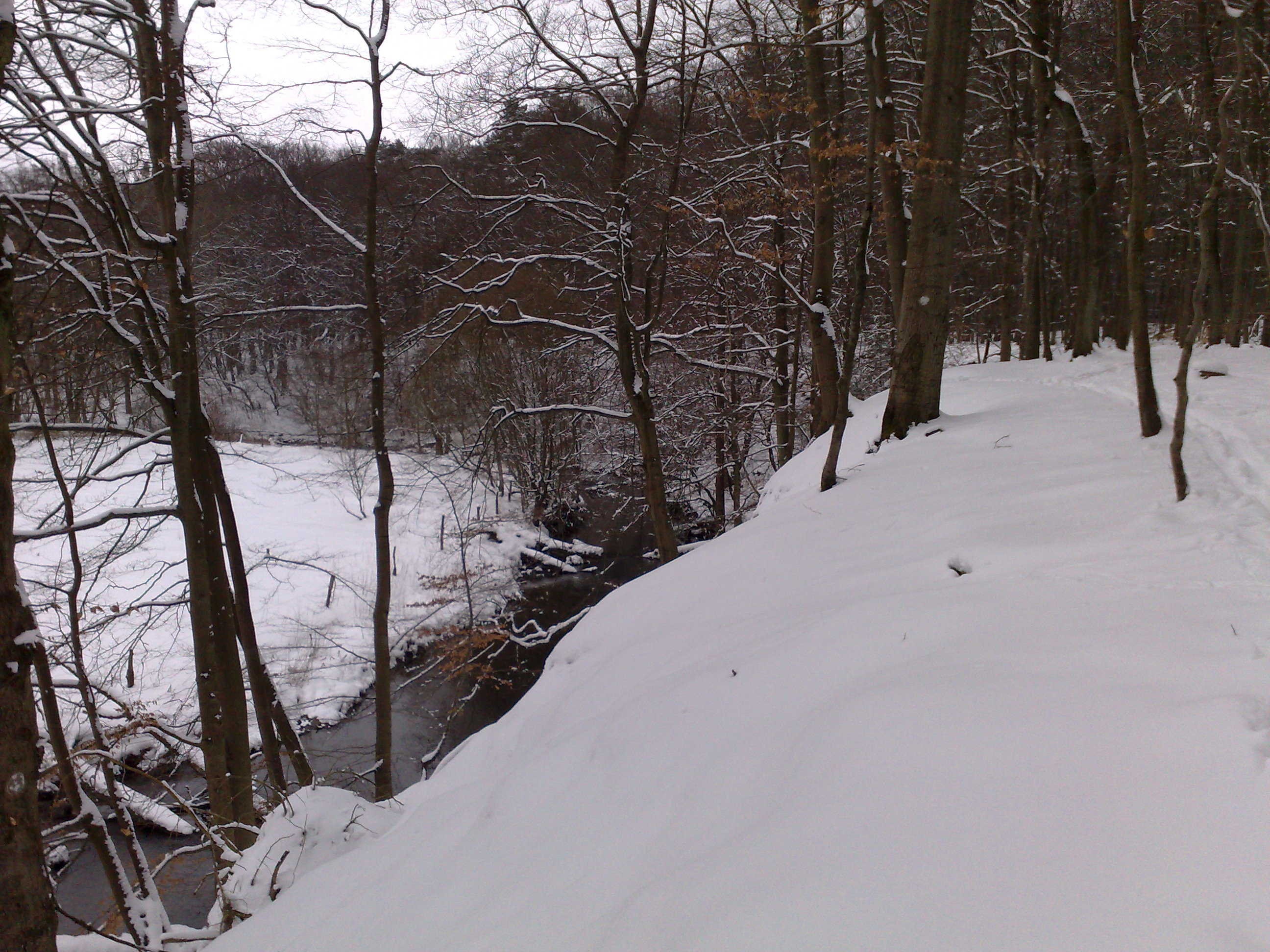
Bille as seen from the Sachsenwald in Winter

=== Art ===
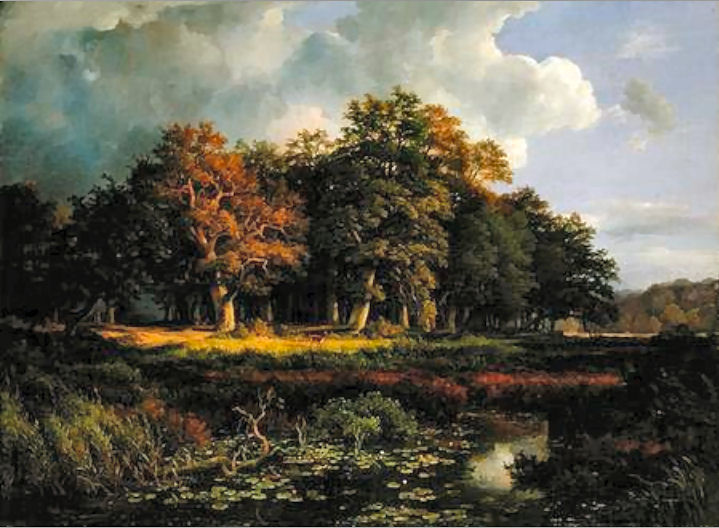
The Sachsenwald in the 19th century. Painting by Adolph Friedrich Vollmer (1852)

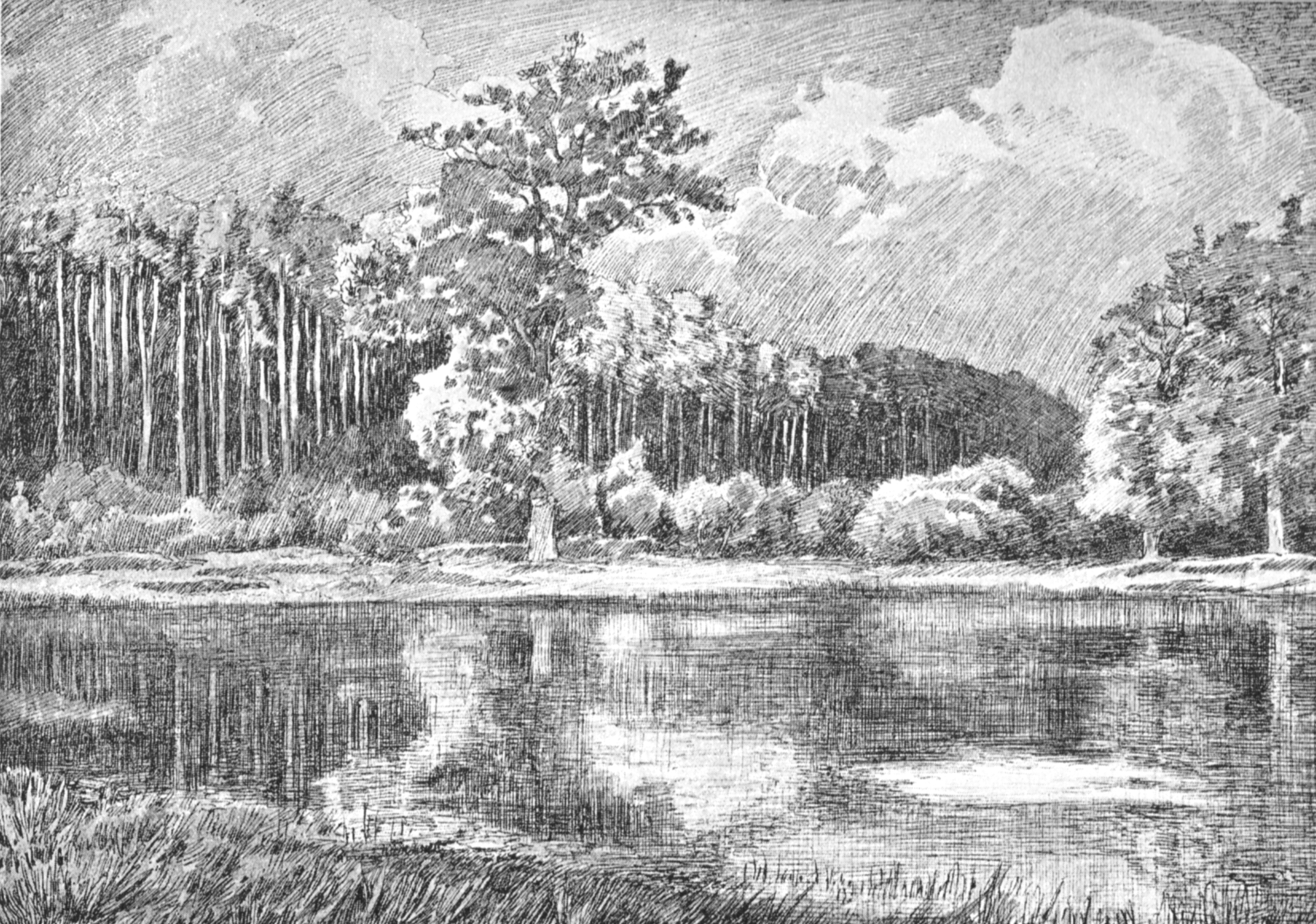
Drawing of the Sachsenwald from the Book Schleswig-Holstein meerumschlungen (1895)

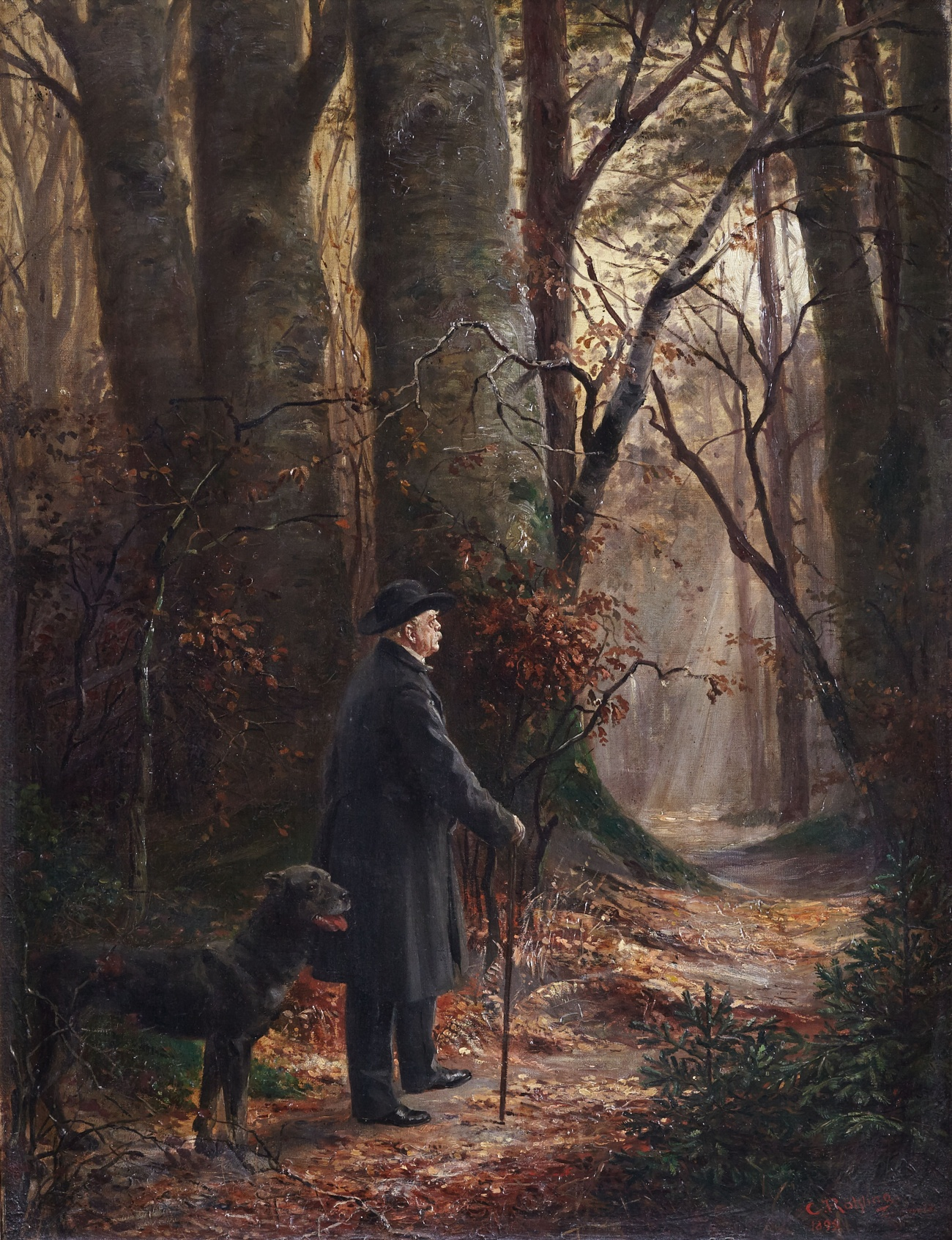
Bismarck with his Great Dane in the Sachsenwald by Carl Röhling (1998)
