= Himmelpforten (Samtgemeinde) =

Coordinates: 53.617°N 9.300°E

Himmelpforten is a former Samtgemeinde ("collective municipality") in the district of Stade, in Lower Saxony, Germany. Its seat was in the village Himmelpforten. It was disbanded on 1 January 2014, when it was merged with the Samtgemeinde Oldendorf to form the new Samtgemeinde Oldendorf-Himmelpforten.

The Samtgemeinde Himmelpforten consisted of the following municipalities:

1. Düdenbüttel
2. Engelschoff
3. Großenwörden
4. Hammah
5. Himmelpforten
