= Himmelpforten Convent =

Convent in Lower Saxony, Germany

- Kloster Himmelpforten
- Location within Lower Saxony
- Interactive map of Himmelpforten Convent

Monastery information
- Other names: Conventus Porta Coeli (Latin); Klooster Hemelpoorten (Low German); Kloster Himmelpforten (German)
- Order: Cistercian; Lutheran Damsels' Convent
- Established: before 1255
- Disestablished: 1630, and again 1647
- Reestablished: 1634
- Dedication: Gate of Heaven
- Diocese: Archdiocese of Bremen
- Controlled churches: Abbey, St. Mary's Church, Großenwörden, and St. Peter's Church, Horst upon Oste

Architecture
- Functional status: defunct
- Style: early Gothic
- Groundbreaking: 1300
- Completion date: 1330

Site
- Location: Himmelpforten
- Coordinates: 53°36′52″N 9°18′17″E
- Visible remains: northern wall of the present Lutheran church

Himmelpforten Convent (Low Saxon: Klooster Hemelpoorten, German: Kloster Himmelpforten; Latin: Conventus Porta Coeli) was founded as a monastery of nuns following the Cistercian Rule during the 13th century in Himmelpforten, in today's Lower Saxony, Germany. During the 16th century, it was converted into use as a Lutheran Damsels' Convent. The Himmelpforten Convent was founded before 1255 and finally dissolved in 1647. The convent complex was built between 1300 and 1330. After 1645 the buildings, including the abbey, increasingly decayed, until they were little by little demolished. The dilapidated abbey was demolished in 1737 and replaced by today's St. Mary's Church which partially covers the foundations of the former abbey.

== History ==
The convent was founded in the mid-13th century on Westerberg hill in Rahden, a location later indicated by St. Andrew's Chapel. As the Cistercian Order had restricted the incorporation of the growing number of women's monastic communities who followed the Cistercian Rule, and since no existing deed neither records the incorporation of the Himmelpforten Convent, nor the appointment of a Father Abbot, as usual for an affiliated community of women, Porta Coeli most likely never officially joined that Order.

In 1244 and 1245 the Cistercian general chapter had determined that a monastery of nuns could be incorporated into the Cistercian Order only if the competent bishop and the competent cathedral chapter exempted the community's temporalities and spiritualities from their control. However, such a wide-ranging exemption from their sovereignty is exactly what Bremen Cathedral chapter and the prince-archbishop did not want, as is described below.

The convent's main benefactor, the Brobergen family (also spelt Broc(k)bergen, extinct in 1745) intended to make it their proprietary monastery. The Brobergens, holding allodial estates, tried to establish the nunnery as their power base out of the immediate prince-archiepiscopal reach, an idea also pursued by the Brobergens' kinsman Frederick of Haseldorf, but failed.

In their aim to establish unrivalled territorial control, the Bremen Cathedral Chapter, led by its then Provost Gerard of Lippe, besides fulfilling religious tasks of the Roman Catholic Archdiocese of Bremen also wielding the secular rule in the much smaller Prince-Archbishopric of Bremen, together with the prince-archbishop of Bremen, then Gerard's sick granduncle Gebhard of Lippe, since 1251 represented by Coadjutor Simon of Lippe, Prince-Bishop of Paderborn, being Gerard's uncle and Gebhard's nephew, managed to integrate the Porta Coeli convent and its holdings as a temporality within the prince-archiepiscopal sovereign territory.

With establishing Porta Coeli as a prince-archiepiscopal outpost to observe and surveil the peasants' ambitions Gerard and Simon of Lippe pursued Prince-Archbishop Gebhard's long-term project of enforcing the reign over the free peasants, e.g. manifesting in Gebhard's earlier subjection of the Stedingers. The integration of Himmelpforten Convent into the prince-archiepiscopal temporalities was fixed in a deed, issued in 1255, on the occasion of moving the convent to then Eylsede/ Eulsete village (literally: Eylo's/Eilhard's seat), later adopting the Low Saxon translation tor Hemmelporten or to der Himilporten of the convent's Latin name Porta Coeli (Gate of Heaven; modern standard German: Himmelpforten).

Eylsede was most likely chosen because its location adjacent to the Osten jurisdiction (Gericht Osten; in the Oste Marshes) and to Kehdingen, both forming corporate bodies of free peasants upholding a certain inner autonomy, claiming and at times gaining seat and franchise at the diets of the estates of the prince-archbishopric (Stiftsstände) and therefore suspected by the chapter and the prince-archbishop to rival their reign.

The deed of 1 May 1255, empowering the convent's Provost Albertus to steward its possessions and waiving the prince-archiepiscopal overlordship, explicitly mentions the donation of Großenwörden village by Frederick of Haseldorf, later canon at the Hamburg subchapter, who in 1250 on the occasion of joining clergy bestowed part of the allodial holdings of his family (extinct in the 1280s) in the Lamstedt Geest and the Oste Marshes on the nunnery. He also donated to other monasteries (Our Lady's Monastery in Stade, Zeven Monastery in Zeven, Harsefeld Archabbey in Harsefeld), but preferred Porta Coeli. The capitular deed also declared that the convent held all its possessions, donated by whom so ever, only by the virtue of the Bremen cathedral chapter, thus denying any exemption from territorial prince-archiepiscopal sovereignty.

In his will, Frederick of Haseldorf, meanwhile Prince-Bishop of Dorpat, bequeathed his personal belongings to Porta Coeli Convent, however Vitslav II, Prince of Rügen, captured and withheld the bequest, so that in 1291 the abbess of Porta Coeli waived its claim, likely in return for some form of compensation. The deed of waiver of 17 March 1291 shows the oldest preserved version of the nunnery's seal, since 1955 officially used by the Himmelpforten municipality.

Besides the Brobergens and Haseldorfs further noble families from the Elbe–Weser triangle (Bremian ministerialis such as the Marschalck family) bestowed land and dues on the convent. The Cistercian nuns elected a male provost as their legal warden as well as their representative at the diets of the prince-archbishopric. The provost and the convent's prioress stewarded its possessions together. Until the secularisation Porta Coeli's provosts were usually simultaneously capitular canons residing in Bremen city. This was because any candidate for provostship had to be confirmed in advance by the Bremen Cathedral Chapter.

The provost also wielded the summary jurisdiction in Porta Coeli's temporal judicature precinct. Furthermore the provost held the ius collationis in the Hechthausen parish. Besides the provost there was also a (ad)vocate (German: Vogt), exerting military protection, managing the Vorwerke, and exercising police function in the convent's jurisdictions. Each nun, and later each conventual, had a home of her own, with her personal maid. All feudal estates (Meierhöfe) in Eulsete (Himmelpforten) were let out on socage (Meierverhältnis) to farmers, and each comprised less land than a family needed for self-sustenance, so that the farmers, men and women alike, depended on work for the convent as farmhands and maids. The convent ran a village school, usually staffed with an educated schoolmaster, and therefore known for its higher standard than ordinary village schools.

In ecclesiastical respect Porta Coeli formed part of the archdeaconry connected in personal union with the Bremen cathedral provost, presiding over the cathedral chapter. His archdeaconry comprised Kehdingen, Vieland and the then vast Oldendorf parish. Before the establishment of Porta Coeli's abbey, which simultaneously served as the local parish church too, Eulsete had formed part of the St. Martin's parish in Oldendorf. Thus the new Himmelpforten parish with the affiliate parishes of Großenwörden and Horst upon Oste formed part of the cathedral provost's archdeaconry too.

After having become Regent of Hadeln Magnus, the heir apparent of Saxe-Lauenburg, on 24 November 1498 allied with his father John V and Henry IV, Duke of Brunswick-Lüneburg in order to conquer the Land of Wursten, an autonomous peasants' corporation under the loose Bremian prince-archiepiscopal overlordship. For the threat of Wursten Bremen's Prince-Archbishop Johann Rode was prepared, since already on 16 November he and Hamburg's three burgomasters (upcoming, presiding, and outgoing), Johannes Huge, Hermen Langenbeck and Henning Buring had concluded a defensive alliance.

Rode appealed at the burghers of Bremen, Hamburg and Stade, which considered the areas downstream the rivers Elbe and Weser their own front yard existential for their free maritime trade connections, so the three Hanseatic cities supported Rode, who further won the Ditmarsians, free peasants under Bremen's loose overlordship. On 1 May 1499 Rode, the Land of Wursten, Hamburg and Bremen concluded a defensive alliance in favour of Wursten in case of another invasion by John XIV of Oldenburg, who had conquered westerly neighbouring Butjadingen in April with the help of the Great or Black Guard of ruthless and violent Dutch and East Frisian mercenaries.

Wursten was thus threatened by Oldenburg from the west and by Magnus from the east. In order to avoid war on two fronts Rode tried to ease the relation with Magnus, but in vain. On 1 August Rode, Bremen's cathedral chapter, more prelates from the prince-archbishopric, as well as the cities of Bremen, Buxtehude, Hamburg, and Stade stipulated to supply 1,300 warriors and equipment to defend Wursten and / or invade Hadeln. Finally on 9 September 1499 Rode waged feud against John V and Magnus. The allied forces easily conquered the Land of Hadeln, defeating Magnus and even drove him out of Hadeln.

By 20 November 1499 Magnus hired the Great or Black Guard, prior operating in Oldenburg, for his purposes. They invaded the prince-archbishopric through the neighbouring Prince-Bishopric of Verden. The Guard southerly by-passed the fortified Buxtehude and Stade, leaving behind a wake of devastation on the countryside and in the monasteries (Altkloster, Neukloster, both localities of today's Buxtehude). Still in 1499 the Guard also looted Porta Coeli, which, however, could ransom itself from being set on fire, before in mid-January 1500 King John of Denmark finally hired the Guard and guaranteed for its safe conduct to his Holstein.

Under the squandering reign of Prince-Archbishop Christopher the Spendthrift the indebted ruler in 1541 ceded his revenues from Porta Coeli to his Chancery Secretary Steffen vom Stein for three years in lieu of a repayment. Christopher's financially burdensome prodigal lifestyle fostered the spreading of the Reformation in the prince-archbishopric. The conversion of the nuns followed the adoption of Lutheranism among the noble families from whom they originated.

The convent's aim was to care for noble women, which was to be maintained and thus it became a Lutheran Damsels' Convent. "The ancestors primarily dedicated, founded and endowed noble … monasteries with estates so that their descendants … who had no desire or were uncomfortable to get married, could be admitted to them and sustained in them." As far as known today, there were no commoners accepted among the nuns and later Lutheran conventuals. The nuns and conventuals originated - amongst others - from the families Brobergen, von der Brock, von Campe, von der Decken, Drew(e)s, von Gruben, von Hadeln, Haken, von der Hude, von Issendorff, von der Kuhla, von der Lieth, Marschalck, Plate, von Reimershausen, Rönne, Voss, and von Weyhe.

By 1550/1555 the convent's provost, wielding the ius nominandi in Großenwörden, Hechthausen and in Horst upon Oste nominated the first Lutheran preacher for St. Peter's Church in Horst, whom then the competent archdeacon, in personal union the cathedral provost of the Bremen chapter, invested according to his ius investiendi. This is taken as evidence that by then the Reformation of the conventuals must have been completed. In 1556 the provost also nominated the first Lutheran preacher for the abbey of Porta Coeli, who was also invested. In 1581 a fire destroyed farms and convent buildings in Himmelpforten.

In the Thirty Years' War after the Battle of Lutter on 17/27 August 1626^{O.S./N.S.} the Catholic Leaguist forces invaded the Bremian prince-archbishopric, capturing one fortified city after the other. After the surrender of Stade on 27 April/7 May 1628^{O.S./N.S.} the Leaguists occupied all the state, including Himmelpforten. Between 1628 and 1629 most Protestant preachers fled the area. In September 1629 the Imperial Commission of Restitution ordered Himmelpforten Convent to hand in a complete register of all its possessions and revenues. Prioress Gerdruth von Campe informed Provost Franz Marschalck, then residing in safe Bremen out of reach for the Leaguist occupants and the Restitution Commission, who on 8/18 October 1629^{O.S./N.S.} personally delivered the demanded information to the Commission then residing in Verden upon Aller.

On 19/29 November^{O.S./N.S.} the Commission's subdelegates, Jacob Brummer and Wilhelm Schröder, arrived at Himmelpforten Convent in order to sight the situation there. Much of the chattels had been plundered by the Leaguists since their invasion. The livestock then counted four horses, two cows and one calf, 15 fattening pigs, 25 breeding pigs, five piglets and uncounted geese, ducks and chickens.

The subdelegates found the abbey church untouched with all its furnishings, such as altars, religious paintings, pews, paraments, chasubles and other liturgical devices. They ordered the prioress to deliver all liturgical devices which they appropriated in favour of the Restitution Commission and brought them to Stade. The prioress made the men aware of the fact that the convent had more liturgical devices stored in a house in Stade. On 22 November/ 2 December 1629^{O.S./N.S.} all the seized liturgical devices from Himmelpforten and in Stade were handed over to the Jesuit Father Matthias Kalkhoven, and disappeared with the Jesuits in April 1632.

Only one chalice from 1422, preserved until today, remained with the convent. On 23 November/ 3 December 1629^{O.S./N.S.} the subdelegates returned to Himmelpforten and interrogated the conventuals as to alienations of convent possessions, but without learning anything new. Then the conventuals were ordered to the abbey quire to acknowledge the seizure of the convent by the Restitution Commission. They were told, that those who would convert to Catholicism until Christmas 1629, would be granted a lifelong annuity, whereas the others would lose their sustenance by Easter 1630 (i.e. 31 March^{N.S.}).

Provost Marschalck refused to deliver the convent's archive, which Henrich Moller in Hamburg held in pledge for an earlier credit to the convent. What happened to the archive is unclear, the credit was obviously never repaid so the archive was never restituted. Marschalck pleaded the Restitution Commission to have mercy on the conventuals who on their entry into the convent had bestowed estates or revenues on it and were without any means if expelled. With the prince-archbishopric plundered and suffering from occupation the conventuals could not hope to find any other refuge. However, the Restitution Commission refused.

On 6/16 May 1630^{O.S./N.S.} the Restitution Commission commissioned Philipp Lütringhausen, Albert Treckel and Chamber Councillor Thomas Runge to evict the conventuals and hand over the convent to the Jesuits in Stade. For 19/29 July^{O.S./N.S.} these three men, accompanied by Father Kalkhoven, gathered in Drochtersen the Kehdingen farmers tithing to the convent, and declared that from then on the tithe would be collected by the Jesuits. On 21/31 July^{O.S./N.S.} the three men, now coming from Stade, arrived again in Himmelpforten and the day after they requested the conventuals to leave their convent since they all steadfastly held on to the Lutheran faith. The men repeated that as Catholic converts the conventuals would be granted alimony.

The conventuals' pleas to allow them to stay acknowledging their steady service to the benefit of the convent and in respect of their faith, did not help it. On 6 August Provost Marschalck personally intervened again at the three men in favour of the conventuals, but in vain. Kalkhoven offered each conventual Rixdollar (Rtlr) 75 and two barrels of rye, if they would leave. The conventuals rejected any gifts. The conventuals were then announced to be violently evicted by noon 28 July/7 August^{O.S./N.S.}. With the administrator regnant, John Frederick, deposed and in exile, the conventuals and the provost were on their own and could not help it. So on 27 July/ 6 August 1630^{O.S./N.S.} the conventuals finally left.

Thereafter the three men formally seized the convent in favour of the new Jesuit college founded in Stade in order to Catholicise the local population. Jesuit Father Kalkhoven literally appropriated the abbatial ring, the kitchen pothook, the keys of the convent, and a sod from the convent garden, representing its landed estates. Kalkhoven also took possession of the Lutheran former abbey church by ceremonially posing his hands over the altar. Already on 26 July/ 5 August 1630^{O.S./N.S.} socage farmers from Himmelpforten had been gathered in order to make them render homage to their new lord, the Society of Jesus. Kalkhoven then usurped the title of Provost of Himmelpforten. Kalkhoven appointed Erich Raschke as administrator, later expelled by the Swedes who took Himmelpforten in early May 1632.

In the second half of April 1632, after the Swedish victory in the Battle of Rain, the Imperial and Leaguist forces, altogether 23,000 men billeted in the area of Himmelpforten, Stade, Buxtehude, the Stade Geest and the Bremian Elbe Marshes, left the prince-archbishopric and with them the foreign Catholic clergy. Now the allied troops of Sweden, the city of Bremen and the Prince-Archbishopric of Bremen under Achatius Tott captured the prince-archbishopric and John Frederick resumed his office as its Administrator regnant. Highly indebted as he was after recruiting and arming his troops allied with the Swedes, he brought in a bill to confiscate all the monasteries in the prince-archbishopric. However, on 20 and 28 May 1633^{O.S.} on the diet in Basdahl the estates of the prince-archbishopric rejected that, but allowed the Administrator regnant to collect the revenues of the monasteries until the Thirty Years' War would end.

With John Frederick's death in 1634 the greatest antagonist to the continued existence of the convents had disappeared, since the estates supported them. By then the conventuals managed to recapture the buildings, however, without the previous revenues then granted to the ruler. After Provost Marschalck had died in June, on 22 November/ 2 December 1638^{O.S./N.S.} the conventuals elected Casper Schulte their new provost. In 1646 Prioress Gerdruth von Campe started recompleting the set of liturgical devices and donated a new chalice, and two years later her fellow conventual Anna Voß bestowed a new paten on the convent, both till this day owned by the Lutheran parish.

Following the Treaty of Brömsebro on 13/23 August 1645^{O.S./N.S.} Sweden seized the Prince-Archbishopric of Bremen, with Swedish troops anyway in the country as concluded by the war alliance between the kingdom and the prince-archbishopric. On 27 October/ 9 November 1647^{O.S./N.S.} Queen Christina of Sweden promised the convent with all its revenues to Count Gustaf Adolf Lewenhaupt/Löwenhaupt (1619–1656), who on 30 July/ 9 August 1651^{O.S./N.S.} was invested with the convent as a fief heritable in the male line (Mannlehen). In 1647 there were twelve conventuals, and 14 women aspirants held abeyances to a sustenance in the convent.

By the Peace of Westphalia in 1648 the prince-archiepiscopal elective monarchy was secularised as the heritable Duchy of Bremen, which was jointly ruled with the new Principality of Verden, as Bremen-Verden, since both imperial fiefs were bestowed on the Swedish crown. By the 1650s the previous religious bodies, such as the Lutheran cathedral chapter or the archdeaconries, had been abolished, their revenues mostly confiscated, with only few of them not granted to Swedish war veterans. On 2/12 September 1651^{O.S./N.S.} the general government of Swedish Bremen-Verden appointed the first general superintendent for the new General Diocese of Bremen-Verden, the state church of Bremen-Verden, presiding over the consistory in Stade. The General Diocese of Bremen-Verden became a subdivision of the Evangelical Lutheran State Church of Hanover on its formation in 1864. Since 1936 its locally competent church district, the General Diocese, is succeeded by the Stade Diocese (Sprengel Stade).

== Legacy ==
On 21/31 May 1650^{O.S./N.S.} Lewenhaupt/Löwenhaupt's plenipotentiary Johann Friedrich [von] Arensen, Privy Councillor Nicolaus von Höpken, general government of Swedish Bremen-Verden, and the conventuals concluded a settlement about the latter's future sustenance. The abeyances were not acknowledged, their aspirants came away empty-handed. The acknowledged conventuals would receive their annuities for all their lives (or until their marriage) and usually lived in the former convent buildings until their death (or marriage). In the fiscal year 1668/1669 still eight conventuals were alive, one married and seven still receiving their annuities.

In today's Himmelpforten a number of toponyms recall the former monastery (German: Kloster), such as Klosterfeld, a former field now a scheme of detached houses built in the 1970s, the Klostergraben, a drainage trench now forming the border between Himmelpforten and Burweg, the Klostermoor, a bog on Himmelpforten's eastern border to Mittelsdorf. The secondary schools in Himmelpforten (Hauptschule and Realschule), founded in 1966, and on 27 November 1975 moved to its present location, have later commonly adopted the Latin name Porta-Coeli-School (PCS).

=== Amt Himmelpforten ===
Since the enfeoffment of Count Lewenhaupt/Löwenhaupt with the former convent this seigniorial entity with its three Vorwerke, its socage farmers and revenues from dues and fines in its jurisdictions was called the Amt Himmelpforten. The last Convent Scribe Erich Everdt Gröning(k) officiated as administrator of the Amt between 1658 and 1663, in 1663 and 1666 his sons Franz and then Heinrich Gröning became Himmelpforten's first bailiffs (Amtmann/Amtleute [sg./pl.]). The term convent continued to be in use, but referred more to the buildings and the pertaining glebe and socage farms than to the wider administrative subdivision, also including neighbouring villages (Breitenwisch, Großenwörden, Horst upon Oste) subject to the former convent's jurisdiction and to dues to be collected.

On 11/21 February 1673^{O.S./N.S.} Michael Grabo, Bremen-Verdian land fiscal, reported to Governor-General Henrik Horn that Bailiff Michael Riedell had removed bricks from dilapidated convent buildings, demolishing even complete structures, in order to sell them. Under the Brandenburgian-Lunenburgian occupation (1675–1679) during the Bremen-Verden Campaign billeting (in Himmelpforten mostly Münster troops staying 11 weeks) and requisitioning goods impoverished the area, with most revenues anyway lacking as they had been already previously deducted for Count Gustaf Mauritz Lewenhaupt/Löwenhaupt (1651–1700), the conventuals did not get their annuities and the convent buildings reached a stage of progressed dilapidation. In 1676 still two conventuals lived in the convent, two lived with relatives, and all the four still claimed their annuities. However, the annuities had not been paid since the start of the campaign in 1675, leaving the three conventuals still alive in 1677 without any means. All the three had then left the convent after it had been plundered by soldiers in the occupying army.

Also the convent house opposite the western façade of the former abbey, now serving as the bailiff's office, called the Amtshaus, was uninhabitable. On 30 March 1677 the competent occupational Lunenburgian government ordered to evacuate the Amtshaus due to dilapidation. The new occupational bailiff Albertus Hartmann blamed the deposed former bailiff Michael Riedell to have alienated convent possessions, when he had built for himself a new house, using also the materials of Catharina von der Kuhla's former house, which this conventual had built on her family's own expenses and had been sold for demolition to Riedell after her death. Hartmann lost his position in 1680 again, when Bremen-Verden was restituted to the Swedish crown, he was succeeded by late Michael Riedell's son Samuel Friedrich Riedell.

In the course of the Great Reduction of 1680 in the following year the general government of Swedish Bremen-Verden revoked the enfeoffment of seignorial Himmelpforten to the Lewenhaupt/Löwenhaupt counts, so that Gustaf Mauritz Lewenhaupt/Löwenhaupt lost the Amt Himmelpforten to the Swedish crown. In 1681 two conventuals were still alive and received again their annuities. In 1684 the reestablished Bremen-Verden general government ordered a greater repair of the decayed former abbey church, and also the remaining convent buildings were restored to some extent, all carried out by the socage farmers. At that time the former Vorwerke were not run with the labour of the socage farmers any more, but all leased to tenants.

As of 1712, under the Danish occupation in the Great Northern War, the plague reached Himmelpforten, killing 84 persons. The Danes enlarged the Amt Himmelpforten by the Oldendorf jurisdiction (Börde Oldendorf). In 1715 they ceded Bremen-Verden to their ally Great Britain-Hanover for Rtlr 600,000, which in 1719 again compensated Sweden with Speziestaler 1,000,000 for its loss, thus gaining the Swedish consent.

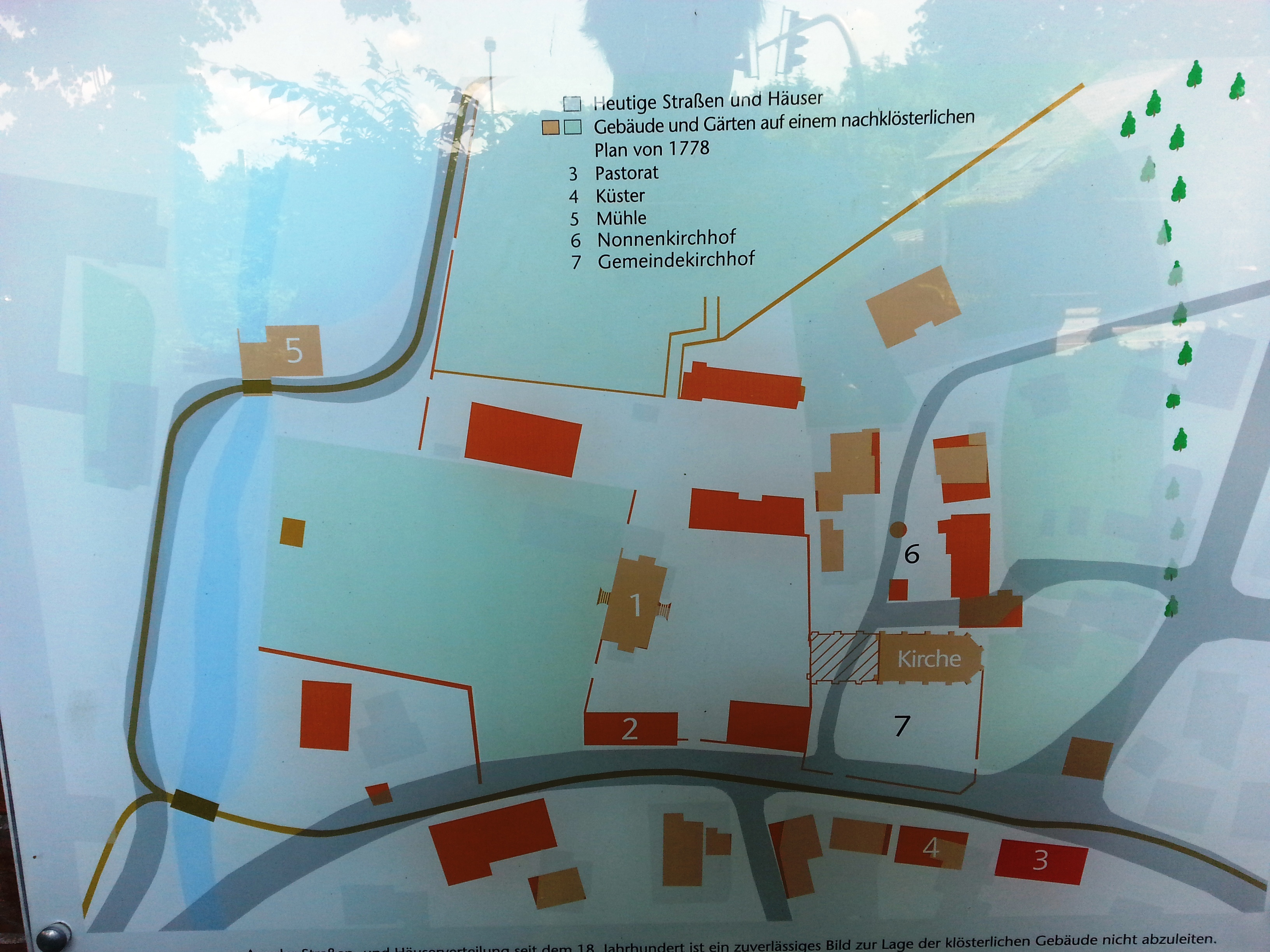
The former convent compound around the church (Kirche) with bailiff's house (1), bailiff's office (2), pastorate (3), sexton's house (4), water mill (5), nuns' cemetery (6) and parish cemetery (7), buildings of 1788 pasted over today's structures.

British-Hanoverian Bremen-Verden retained the Amt Himmelpforten, then Royal and Electoral Bailiwick of Himmelpforten (i.e. Königliches und Churfürstliches Ampt Himmelpforten) as a rather administrative subdivision, but reorganised it according to the Hanoverian Bailiwick Ordinance (Amtsordnung) of 1674. In the subsequent years the government of British-Hanoverian Bremen-Verden demolished and rebuilt all the remaining convent buildings, such as the church (1738), the schoolhouse, the mill, the bailiff's office and the pastorate.

During the short-lived Westphalian annexation (1810) the territory of the Amt Himmelpforten formed part of the Canton of Stade and Himmelpforten, established on 1 September 1810 and seated in Stade. With effect of 1 January 1811 all the South Elbian German coast and its hinterland was annexed to France and the area of the Amt Himmelpforten formed the Canton de Himmelpforten in the Bouches-de-l'Elbe Department. In 1813 after the French annexation the Amt Himmelpforten was restituted, and Bremen-Verden was reestablished too, however, all its grown local peculiarities in administration were levelled when this Hanoverian province became the High-Bailiwick of Stade in 1823.

The Amt, having lost its seignorial character through the abolition of feudalism in the 18th and 19th century (In the Kingdom of Hanover farmers became proprietors of the land they tilled in 1832.), became a mere administrative subdivision. In 1834 the Amt Stade-Agathenburg merged in the Amt Himmelpforten which by large existed in this new extension until 1885, when the Prussian district organisation was also applied to the Province of Hanover. In 1852 the Amt Osten took over the municipalities of Großenwörden and Neuland upon Oste with Neulandermoor from the Amt Himmelpforten, also ceding the municipality of Elm, which in 1859 became part of the Bremervörde district, now merged in the Rotenburg District. The remaining area of the former Amt Himmelpforten forms part of the District of Stade since 1885. Today's Oldendorf-Himmelpforten collective municipality pretty much covers the former Amt Himmelpforten in its extent of 1712.

== Convent buildings ==
The Cistercian convent buildings comprised the abbey, the actual convent and outbuildings, erected between 1300 and 1330. There were an abbey, a priorate, a granary, a threshing barn, a cart shed, a stable, a bakehouse, a mill, nuns' homes and a janitor's house, the latter along the northern wall of the abbey.

The abbey served from the beginning on also as the parish church of the Himmelpforten parish (Kirchspiel Himmelpforten). By 1320 the actual abbey church was completed. The abbey was a typically Cistercian plain building in early Gothic style. As the church of a mendicant order the abbey had no spire but a wooden ridge turret.

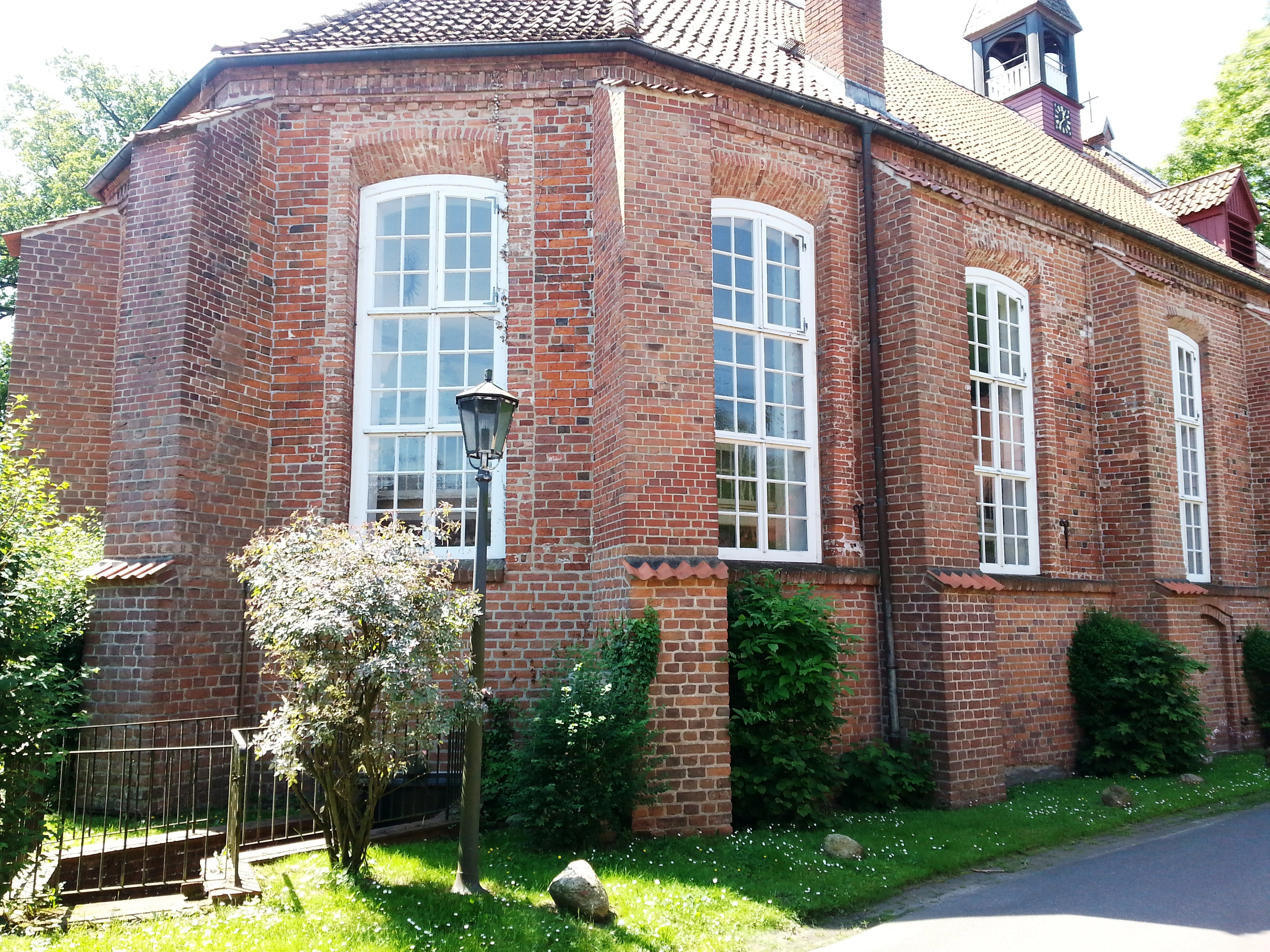
The northern façade of the abbey was kept and integrated into today's St. Mary's Church

The abbey comprised seven bays with 21 pillars carrying the vaulted ceiling. The abbey's external dimensions measured Bremian ft 141 (40.8 metres [134 ft]) in length and ft 46 (13.31 metres [43.7 ft]) in width, whereas its vault ceiling reached a height of ft 44 (12.73 metres [41.8 ft]). The polygonal apse was also vaulted. The abbey was torn down in 1737, except of part of its northern wall and the northern corner of the apse, which were integrated into the new Lutheran St. Mary's Church completed in 1738.

In 1728 the convent school was demolished due to dilapidation and replaced by a new school. In the same year the convent building, then called the Amtshaus (bailiff's office), west of the abbey, was demolished and replaced by the new Amtshaus, completed in 1729, now housing the Birkenhof home for the elderly.

Already in 1673 in his report Land Fiscal Grabo judged the pastorate dilapidated, its roof leaky and its posts sinking into the ground. In 1706 Preacher Michael Schreiner complained to the government about the bad state of repair. In 1732 the old pastorate south of the main street opposite to the abbey was torn down and replaced by a new building, itself again demolished in 1972. The convent's watermill on the Horsterbeck creek close to the main street was demolished in 1739, and a new one was built more downstream. Bricks of cloister format size, stemming from the demolished convent, were found in the western façade of St. Mary's Church, the new mill and private buildings in the convent's vicinity.

In 1779 the janitor's house was enforced to become the local jail. After the jail was relocated to Stade the chairman of the Ortsarmenkasse (local poor relief fund) lived in the janitor's house, later the court usher, before the building, then the last of the original convent, was demolished in 1877/1878.

=== Vorwerke ===
All farmers of Himmelpforten village were subject to serjeanty (Hofdienst, i.e. estate service) in favour of the nunnery. The nunnery ran three Vorwerke, outlying agricultural farm estates employing farmhands and additionally farmers obliged to serjeanty. The Vorwerke were managed by the (ad)vocate (Vogt). Thus the nunnery ran a Vorwerk on Stubbenkamp (on fields now named the Herrlichkeit, i.e. seigniority, which is a part of today's Himmelpforten), the Vorwerk at Horst and a third in Neuland upon Oste, a part of today's Engelschoff.

The Vorwerk farm buildings on Stubbenkamp, a main timber-framed building measuring Bremian ft 236 (68.29 metres [224.0 ft]) times Bremian ft 50 (14.47 metres [47.5 ft]) and a barn measuring Bremian ft 120 (34.72 metres [113.9 ft]) times Bremian ft 50, were demolished in 1717, subsequently the site was let out on socage to a farmer. At the Stubbenkamp Vorwerk and at the Diekenbrook plot there were stewponds for the fish as fasting dishes at lent.

Today's coat of arms of Himmelpforten, based on the nunnery's seal as shown in a deed of 17 March 1291.

The former Vorwerk in Neuland comprised five buildings, a residential house, a bakehouse, a pigsty, a granary and a crop barn. It is recalled by the field name Vorwerk in Neuland. The Vorwerk at Horst was in fact located in Breitenwisch on a plot now covered by the Jarck Farm. The outlying former socage farms attached to the Vorwerk at Horst, located at bit more northwest of the Vorwerk now form the village of Horst upon Oste.

== Seal ==
A deed of 17 March 1291 shows the oldest preserved version of the nunnery's seal, the model to today's coat of arms used by the municipality of Himmelpforten. The Amt Himmelpforten, however, used an altered variant of that coat of arms showing in the arch instead of the nun the ducal Bremian Saint Peter's crosswise keys.

== Possessions and revenues ==
Porta Coeli never developed a sustainable farming of its own. Its landed estates and other revenue-yielding assets did not form a closed compound but were dispersed in the central and northeastern part of the Prince-Archbishopric of Bremen (Stade Geest and Bremian Elbe Marshes). Like many other nunneries Porta Coeli lived of feudal leases, tithes and other dues, earlier often in kind, such as also socage and serjeanty. Porta Coeli let out most of its farmland on socage to farmers, and ran only smaller and closer parts of all its lands through its Vorwerke using labour of farmers subject to serjeanty. The Vorwerke were managed by the (ad)vocate (Vogt). Besides his military task of protecting, his task was to prevent farmers from poaching, pasturing on nunnery's land, forbidden lumbering and peat-cutting and of pursuing culprits, collecting the dues and leases.

For the fiscal year 1625/1626 the overall revenues of the convent amounted to Mark 3,014 Shilling 1 and Pfennig 10, its expenses were Mk 3,118:14:7. For 1626/1627 the corresponding numbers were 3,498.14.7 and 3,617.11.10. By the end of the 17th century the convent's revenues divided into Mk 2,671.28.4 of fix and Mk 1,854.25.3 of variable receipts. The farmers in Himmelpforten were all subject to serjeanty to the convent and had to pay a lease for the land, which they tilled. All of the convent's estates (Meierhöfe) leased under feudal law were heritable under the principle of ultimogeniture (Minorat). Originally most dues were in kind, later they were monetised, and even partially collected by third parties such as publicans, sometimes being the collective of tax-payers themselves, such as the tithing farmers of Isensee, Twielenfleth, Uthwege, Großenwörden, Hüll, Kehdingen or Altes Land, who thus economised their charges.

The watermill charged the suckeners with the sixteenth part of the grist as the multure (Low Saxon: Matte) in favour of the convent. The inhabitants of Blumenthal, Bossel, Burweg, Düdenbüttel, Hammah, Hammahermoor, Himmelpforten, Mittelsdorf, Ochsenpohl, and Ramels were thirled to the convent's mill. Only the nuns (later the conventuals), the pastor and the local officials were exempt from the multure.

In 1645 the convent's annual revenues amounted to Rixdollar (Rtlr) 3,501. In 1650 the convent's estates earned the second lowest revenues of all Bremian-Verdian monasteries, only Neuenwalde Convent earned even less. Therefore also the convent's share in levying war taxes was rather low, it was 0.012% (or $\tfrac{72}{6000}$) of the total revenues from taxes to be levied. Other charges on the convent were the triannual delivery of 15 cows to the prince-archiepiscopal residential Vörde Castle in Bremervörde.

Single possessions and revenues, besides the Vorwerke mentioned above (see #Vorwerke) were the following:

- the overlordship over Rahden with its mills and meadows, the tithe of its inhabitants, the Westerberg hill (the original site of the nunnery) with its forests, furthermore a farmstead donated by Gertrud von Bro(c)bergen (Brobergen) in 1344, and more fields in Rahden donated by the Bro(c)bergen in 1304, 1312 and 1348
- the village Eylsede (today's Himmelpforten) with all its revenues and forests
- two feudal estates (Meierhöfe) in Abbenseth (a part of today's Hollnseth)
- half the tithe in Bardesfleth (today's Grünendeich) and some other estates there
- three farmsteads in Basbeck (a part of today's Hemmoor), a quarter of the tithe from the fields there, and two Morgen of land, donated by Johann von Brockbergen (Brobergen) in 1343 in order to compensate for a damage his father inflicted on the nunnery
- some estates in Bassenfleth (a part of today's Hollern-Twielenfleth)
- the summary jurisdiction over Blumenthal (a part of today's Burweg) with all fines, and nine feudal estates there
- ten feudal estates in Borstel, i.e. Bossel (a part of today's Burweg)
- the summary jurisdiction over Breitenwisch (a part of today's Himmelpforten) with all fines
- the summary jurisdiction over Burweg with all fines, furthermore some land there, donated in 1358 by Daniel and Gothfridus von Bro(c)bergen (Brobergen)
- the tithe of Drochtersen fixed to 100 bushels (Stade Scheffel of 1.9 litres [0.42 imp gal] each) of wheat
- two feudal estates in Düdenbüttel
- two feudal estates in Ebersdorf
- the summary jurisdiction over Engelschoff with all fines
- the summary jurisdiction over Großenwörden with all fines, executed by the heritable judge-farmer, as well as the tithe of many farmers subject to the nunnery
- the tithe in Halstenfleth (a part of today's Hollern-Twielenfleth), on 8 September 1303 bought by the nunnery 200 Mark payable in Stade pennies
- one farm in Hammah, however, subject to socage and dues to the (ad)vocate of Vörde (today's Bremervörde)
- the great tithe from Heeßel (since 1968 a locality of Hemmoor)
- the great tithe from Hemm (since 1968 a locality of Hemmoor)
- the summary jurisdiction over Horst upon Oste with all fines, and ten feudal estates there, however under Dutch law (Hollerrecht)
- the tithe and all the summary jurisdiction with its fines in Hüll (a locality of today's Drochtersen)
- the tithe of Ickenborstel (a location unknown today), donated in 1360 by the Bro(c)bergen (Brobergen)
- the tithe from ten farmers in Isensee (a part of today's Osten)
- forests and adjacent meadows in Kaken (a locality of today's Oldendorf)
- the summary jurisdiction over Kleinwörden (a locality of today's Hechthausen) with all fines
- great and small tithe from Lamstedt
- leases and great tithes from vast lands in the Lamstedt Geest, once donated by the Brobergen and Marschalck families
- the tithe in Mittelstenahe
- the summary jurisdiction over Neuland upon Oste (a locality of Engelschoff) with all fines
- two feudal estates in Oerel
- the tithe from Oldendorf
- half the fisheries in the Oste between Burweg and Großenwörden
- one estate in Ottensen (a locality of today's Buxtehude)
- two houses on Bungenstraße, one extramural house near the gate Schiffertor in Stade
- the small tithe in Stinstedt
- wheat amounting to 20 bushels of Stade measure (Stade Scheffel of 1.9 litres [0.42 imp gal] each) from Tetenem (i.e. Altendorf north of Wischhafen)
- half the tithe from Twielenfleth (a part of today's Hollern-Twielenfleth) and some other estates there
- some estates in Urenfleth (a part of today's Cranz)
- the tithe from Uthwege (in today's Mittelnkirchen)
- one house with tithe in Verlo (a location unknown today)
- the tithe from Vruthlem (a location unknown today)
- the great tithe of all inhabitants of Warstade (a locality of Hemmoor), dues from 1.5 feudal estates, and three farmsteads there
- feudal estates in Wasserkrug (a locality of Engelschoff)
- six feudal estates in Westerhamm (a locality of today's Wingst)

== Leadership ==
Abbesses, prioresses, provosts and (ad)vocates of the nunnery and subsequent convent:

=== Abbesses and prioresses ===
At Porta Coeli with a rather few nuns and conventuals, respectively, the term prioress prevailed over abbess for their chairwoman.

- Elizabeth/Elisabeth, mentioned 8 September 1303 as abbess
- Ghiselen, mentioned in 1343 as Domina, emphasising the prioress' role as feudal overlady
- Luitgardis, mentioned in 1358 as prioress
- Elisabeth, mentioned in 1399 as prioress
- Margarete, mentioned in 1399 as abbess
- Mathilde, mentioned in 1473 as prioress and abbess
- Lücke von Sandbeck, mentioned in 1528 as abbess
- Katherine von der Hude, mentioned in 1562 as prioress
- Maria von Weyhe (died in 1616), officiated as prioress at least since 1596, her epitaph is preserved in today's Lutheran St. Mary's Church
- Adelheid von der Lieth, titled prioress
- Gerdruth von Campe, mentioned in 1629 as prioress and 1646

=== Provosts ===
- Albertus, mentioned 1255
- Bertold, mentioned 1 May 1287, 8 September 1303
- John of Bielefeld, mentioned in 1330, 1343
- Wasmot of the Kind family based in Kranenburg upon Oste, mentioned in 1375, 1379
- Heinrich von Osten, mentioned in 1433
- Johannes Kroch/Johann van Kroge, mentioned in 1498
- Johann/Martin Reyff, mentioned in 1528
- Reinhard von Bäuligh/Buligh, mentioned in 1539, 1543
- Franz von der Lieth, per pro for one year in 1548
- Engelbert Gripenstroet/Griepenstroth, since 1550, mentioned in 1557
- Segebade von der Hude, mentioned in 1559, 1562, 1571
- Otto von der Hude (died in 1590), inaugurated into office in 1571, mentioned also in 1572, 1583, 1584, and 1587
- Franz Marschalck (von Bachtenbrock; died on 18/28 June 1638^{O.S./N.S.}), 1590/1591–1630, and again 1632 to 1638, mentioned in 1591, 1629 in 1630.
- Matthias Kalkhoven, usurped position serving as provost between August 1630 and April 1632
  - Erich Raschke as administrator, appointed by Kalkhoven
- Franz Marschalck, restituted to provostship
- Caspar Schulte, 1638 to 1646 (likely)
- Detlev von der Kuhla, until the secularisation in 1647
- Daniel [von] Arensen, not elected but appointed by Count Lewenhaupt/Löwenhaupt
  - Johann Friedrich [von] Arensen, as of 1650 superintendent per pro for his warfaring brother Daniel

=== Vögte / (ad)vocates ===
The (ad)vocates (German: Vogt/Vögte), exerted military protection, managed the Vorwerke, and exercised police functions in the convent's jurisdictions. Thus they had to prevent farmers from poaching, pasturing on nunnery's land, forbidden lumbering and peat-cutting and to pursue culprits, furthermore they collected the dues and leases.

- Adolph Bremer, after the Thirty Years' War

=== Amtleute / bailiffs ===
The Amt Himmelpforten was presided over by the Amtmann (pl. Amtleute; bailiff), later also granted other titles such as Drost (bailiff), Oberamtmann (superior bailiff) or Kreishauptmann (district captain). The list follows Georg von Issendorff.

- Transition from convent to seignorial estate
  - since 1658: Erich Evert Gröning, Amt scribe, before Gröning had been the convent scribe
  - before 1663–1666: Franz Gröning, son of the former, administrator of the Himmelpforten jurisdiction, appointed by Count Lewenhaupt/Löwenhaupt
- 1666–1668: Heinrich Gröning, brother of the former
- 1668–1677: Michael Riedell, deposed by occupying Lunenburg-Celle
- 1677–1680: Albertus Hartmann, appointed by occupying Lunenburg-Celle
- 1680–1682: Samuel Friedrich Riedell, son of Michael Riedell, appointed on 4/14 February 1680^{O.S./N.S.} by Count Gustaf Mauritz Lewenhaupt/Löwenhaupt, deposed by the general government of Swedish Bremen-Verden in early summer
- 1682–1705: Lotharius Feindt (1644–9 April 1705)
- 1705–1712: Johann von Leutschberg, deposed by the Danish occupiers
- 1712–1752: Ernst Friedrich Pflueg (4 January 1678 – 11 April 1754)
- 1752–1760: Johann Hermann Meyer (1706–21 September 1760)
- 1761–1767: Diedrich Bremer (1712–13 August 1767), titled drost
- 1768–1779: Heinrich Philip Tiling (1706–13 August 1779)
- 1780–1793: Heinrich Wilhelm Rautenberg (1718–?), titled Oberamtmann (superior bailiff)
- 1793–1810: Johann Friedrich Keyßler (2 March 1734 – 14 March 1810)
- 1810–1811: Westphalian annexation, area formed part of the Canton of Stade and Himmelpforten
- 1811–1813: French annexation, area formed Canton de Himmelpforten
  - 1811–1813: Johann Friedrich Meyer, titled Canton's maire
- 1814–1818: Claus Carl Eberhard von der Decken (1780–2 October 1818), titled drost
- 1818–1836: Carl August Diedrich von Goeben (1781–?), titled drost, transferred to Osterholz
- 1836–1849: Eduard August Reinbold (9 July 1779 – 8 June 1849), titled Oberamtmann
- 1849–1867: Friedrich Christian von Marschalck, deposed by annexing Prussia
- 1867–1878: Heinrich Reinick (8 July 1836–?), titled Kreishauptmann, before Landrat per pro in Malmedy
- 1878–1885: Nikolaus Caspar Adolf Goetze, titled Kreishauptmann
