= Oldendorf (Samtgemeinde) =

Coordinates: 53.579°N 9.265°E

Oldendorf is a former Samtgemeinde ("collective municipality") in the district of Stade, in Lower Saxony, Germany. Its seat was in the village Oldendorf. It was disbanded on 1 January 2014, when it was merged with the Samtgemeinde Himmelpforten to form the new Samtgemeinde Oldendorf-Himmelpforten. The Samtgemeinde of Oldendorf consisted of the following municipalities:

- Burweg
- Estorf
- Heinbockel
- Kranenburg
- Oldendorf
