= Brobergen =

Village in Lower Saxony, Germany

Coordinates: 53°35′46″N 9°11′15″E

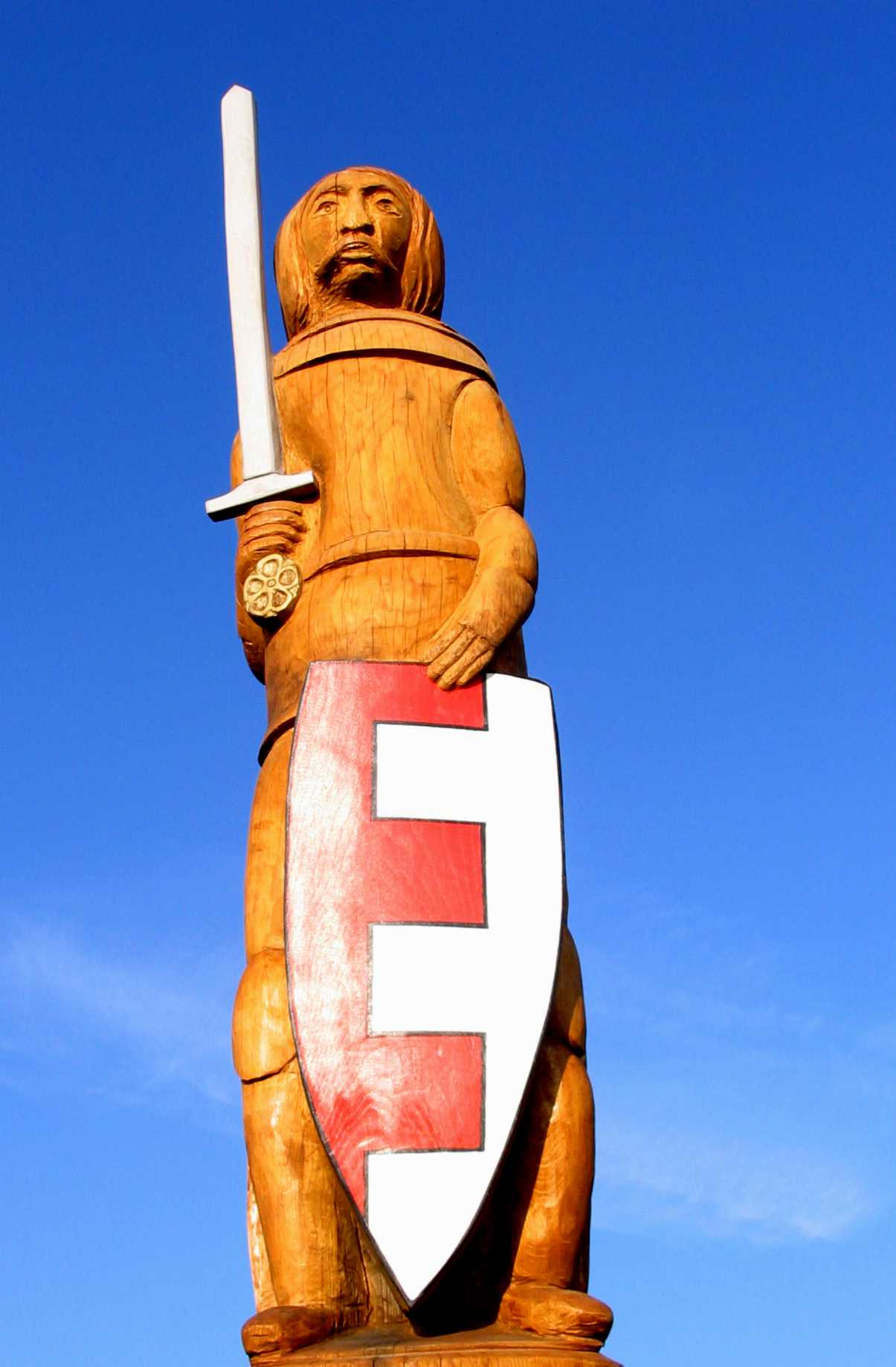
Roland statue of Brobergen

Brobergen (Low Saxon: Brobargen) is a village in the German municipality of Kranenburg in the district of Stade, Lower Saxony. The village of 6.06 km² has 220 inhabitants (July 1, 2011).

The village lies on the right (eastern) bank of the Oste river. The river Mehe, a tributary of the Oste, has its estuary near Brobergen. There is a ferry crossing from the village to the Hollander Höfe, once the ancestral seat of the noble family von Brobergen, on the left bank of the river. It was a separate municipality until it merged with Kranenburg in 1972.

== Geography ==
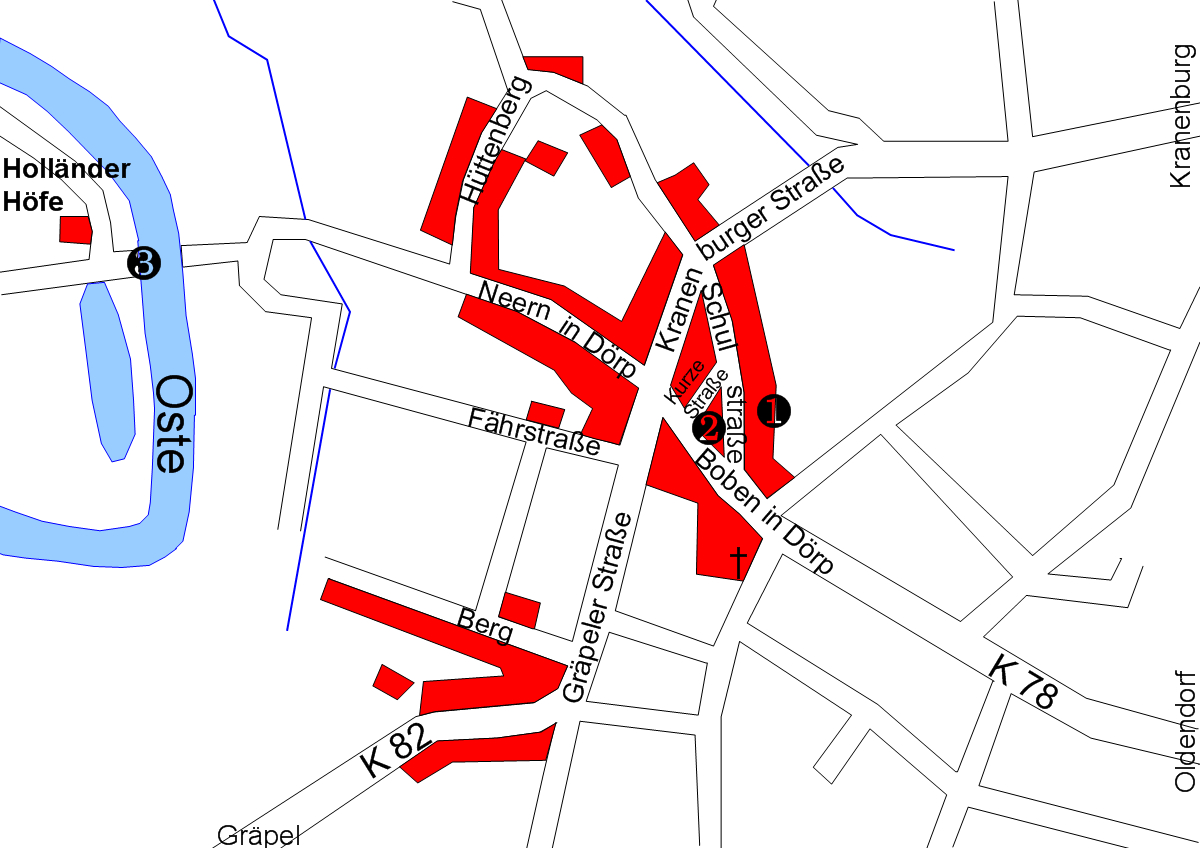
Plan of Brobergen ❶ shows the Dorfgeminschaftshaus or Sport- und Kulturzentrum (community center) ❷ shows the volunteer fire department ❸ shows the Oste ferry ❹ shows the site of the Roland statue † shows the cemetery and chapel

Brobergen lies at the edge of the Marshland along the Oste river. The Mehe river with its outlet close to Brobergen is a leftside tributary of the Oste. The Oste is a tidal river close to sea level. The village itself lies at about three meter above sea level on the edge of the Geest. On the border to Oldendorf the elevation rises to about 17,5 m above sea level.

The Deutsche Fährstraße (German Ferry Route) runs through Brobergen. It's a touristic route that connects places showcasing different modes of transportation across water along a 250 km line between Bremervörde and Kiel. In Brobergen the pram ferry is part of this route.

Part of Brobergen are the smaller places Berg, Hollander Höfe and Hüttenberg.

Neighbouring places are Kranenburg in the north, Oldendorf in the east, Estorf in the southeast, Gräpel in the southwest, Ostendorf in Landkreis Rotenburg (Wümme) in the east and Nindorf, Cuxhaven in Landkreis Cuxhaven in the northwest.

== History ==
The name of the village first occurs in a charter from 1286 and was written Brocberge back then. Its name is cognate with the English terms brook and barrow and indicated a region with small mounts along a stream. This name once referred to a larger area along the Oste between Gräpel and Burweg.

In 1141 a charter from count Rudolf of Stade mentions the three brothers Dudo, Adiko and Ricbert, who founded the Marienkloster in Stade and who also got Brobergen as a fiefdom. At that time the whole region along the Oste river was meant. Only in 1286 a descendant of the three brothers, Otto de Brocberge, and his borch to brogberghen (castle in Brobergen) is mentioned. This castle was probably built a few years before 1286. Close to the position of that castle another castle had existed before, but its existence is only known from old documents and no evidence of it has been unearthed so far.

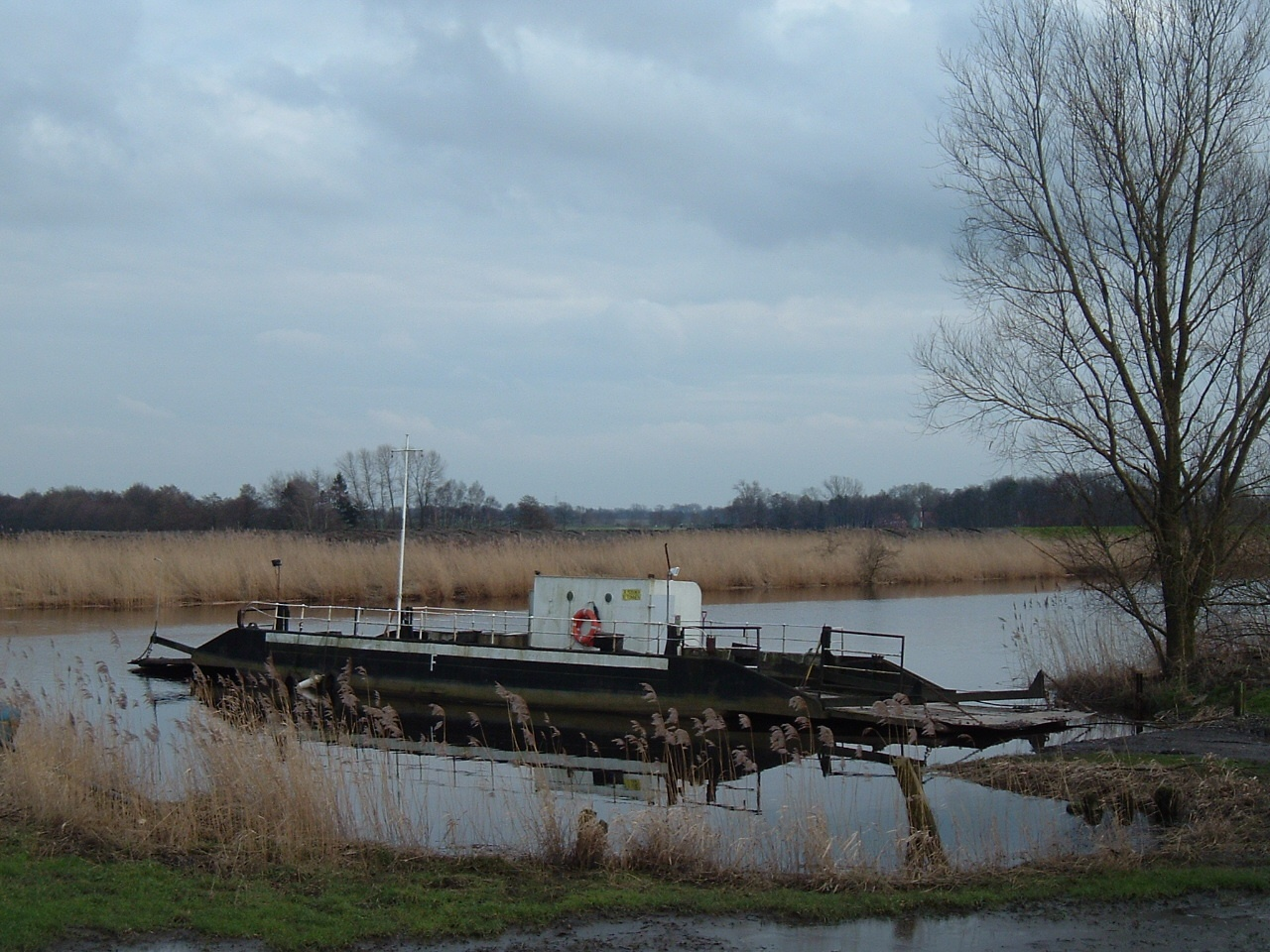
Pram ferry of Brobergen

In 1364 a chapel, the Chapel of the Holy Cross, is first mentioned. A charter from 1525 mentions a statue of Roland that existed in Brobergen. This Roland was re-erected in 2007.

The noble family von Brobergen resided on the estate Hollander Höfe until they were forced to sell it in 1618.

Before the Thirty Years' War a drawbridge existed over the Oste river. Tilly's troops destroyed it around 1628 to prevent a Danish attack. Shortly afterwards people began to use prams to reach the farmland across the Oste river.

Ownership over the land changed between several owners, most of them Hamburg merchants until in 1837 local farmers collectively purchased the land they had cultivated since generations.

In the 19th and early 20th century there were many brickyards along the Oste river which made bricks from the marsh clay.

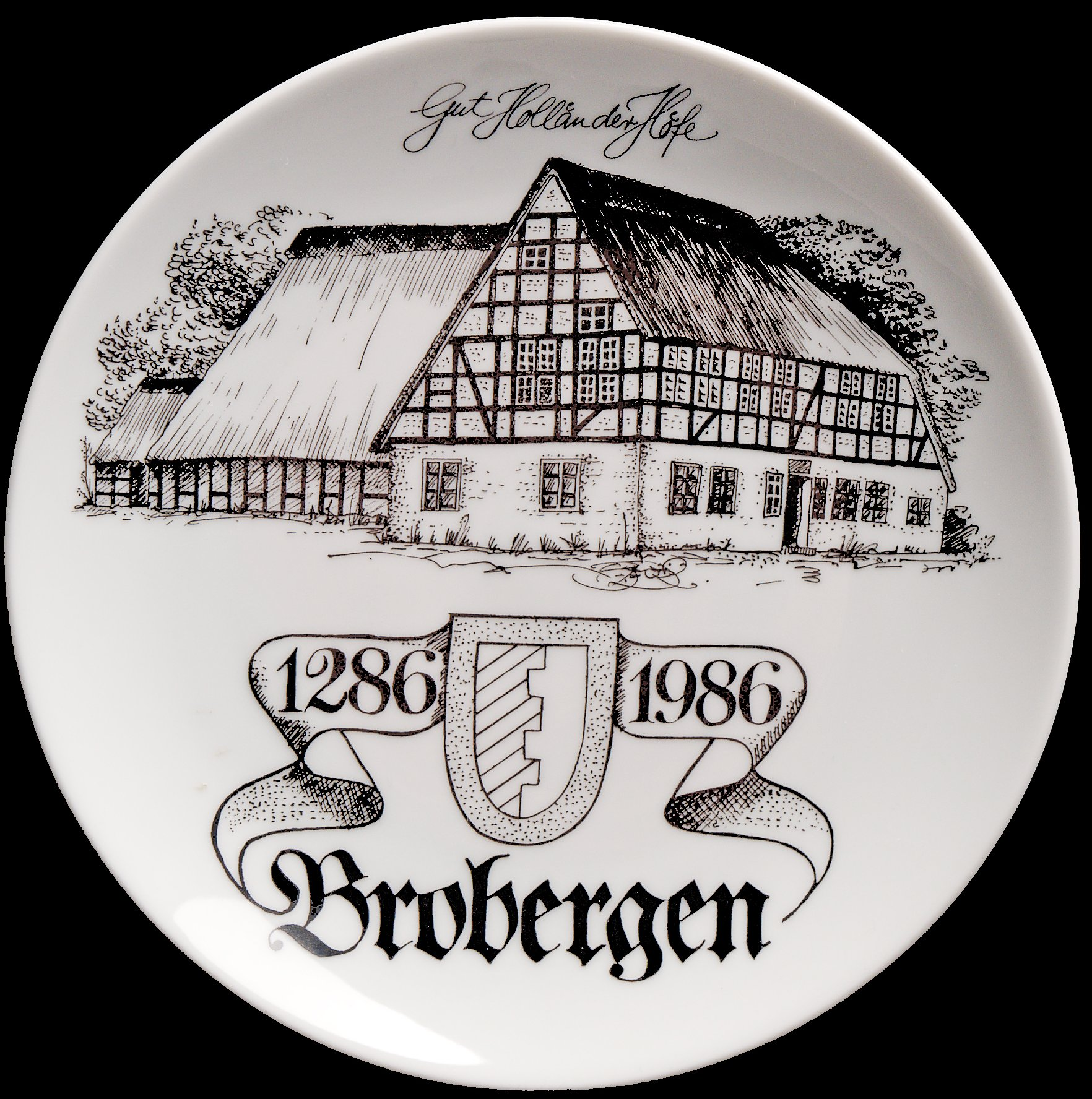
Memorial plate showing the estate Hollander Höfe, issued for the celebrations of the 700 year anniversary of Brobergen

The estate Hollander Höfe existed until 1941 when it was demolished because it was in an out of repair condition. The current house at the estate's site was constructed in 1956 as a living place for the ferry operator and the operator of the Mehe river barrage.

With the local government reorganization in 1972 former municipalities Brobergen and Kranenburg formed a new municipality under the name Kranenburg.

=== Religion ===
Brobergen is traditionally a Lutheran community and part of the Oldendorf parish. The village has its own cemetery and small cemetery chapel at the village exit towards Oldendorf. It's occasionally used for local church services.

=== Population ===
In 1766 there were 17 households in Brobergen. After World War II the population rose by 100 people to 330 inhabitants due to an influx of people expelled in the east. After some years the population number dropped to pre-war levels.

Year	1848	1871	1885	1905	1910	1925	1933	1939	1946	1956	1963	1971	2003	2008
Population	212	235	224	271	263	252	240	247	328	256	271	232	226	216

=== Mayors ===
The mayors of Brobergen municipality until being merged with Kranenburg municipality in 1972 were:

Time	Mayor
1873–1890	Hinrich Buck
1890–1910	Johann Schult
1910–1911	Dietrich Waller
1911–1914	Andreas Schult
1914–1916	Jürgen Elfers
1916–1922	Theodor Buck
1922–1933	Hinrich Ney (senior)
1933–1943	Hinrich Ney (junior)
1943–1946	Hermann Buck
1946–1956	Jürgen Steffens
1956–1964	Hinrich Buck
1964–1972	Helmut Hudaff

=== Coat of Arms ===
Coat of arms of Brobergen

The coat of arms of Brobergen is red and silver separated by merlons. The municipality Brobergen bore the coat of arms since 31 March 1948 in succession of the former noble family von Brobergen. Since Brobergen became part of Kranenburg municipality this coat of arms is also part of the coat of arms of Kranenburg municipality.

=== Street names ===
Only with the local government reorganization in 1972 Brobergen first got street names. Before 1972 houses were just numbered.

(In parentheses Low Saxon names. If no parentheses are given the official German name is a loan from Low Saxon.)

Berg (Barg)
The name means "mount" due to its slightly elevated altitude above the surrounding marsh. It's a separate part of the village and 500 m away of the main part.
Boben in Dörp
The name means "in the upper part of the village" towards the Geest.
Fährstraße (Fährstraat)
The name means "ferry street" and leads to the Oste river and the ferry.
Hüttenberg (Hüttenbarg)
The name means "cottage mount". It's the part of Brobergen closest to the Oste river. The houses here were built relatively lately and they were no farmsteads as in the main village but just smaller cottages.
Kurze Straße (Korte Straat)
The name means "short street". It's a short way with just one house connecting Boben in Dörp and Schulstraße.
Neern in Dörp
The name means "in the lower part of the village" towards the marsh.
Schulstraße (Schoolstraat)
The name means "school street" and until 1966 the school was situated in this street.
Gräpeler Straße/Kranenburger Straße (Gröpler Straat/Kronenborger Straat)
The names mean "Gräpel street" and "Kranenburg street" as they lead to these two places respectively. They formerly formed the Ostestraße (Ostestraat) which ran through several municipalities along the Oste river, but it was renamed in Kranenburg municipality because of concerns that ambulances could be misdirected due to the length of the street.

== Culture ==
A pram ferry crosses the Oste river in Brobergen and is part of the Deutsche Fährstraße. At the ferry site there is a small inn called "Fährkrug". The ferry and the inn are used by many bike tourists visiting the region.

Brobergen has an active Schützenverein with a two-day Schützenfest each year on the third weekend in July.

=== Traditions ===
Every year on pentecost Maibaums are erected by the youth of the village. On New Year there's a tradition of walking through the village, visiting households and having drinks together while the children collect candy.

=== Buildings ===
==== War Memorial ====
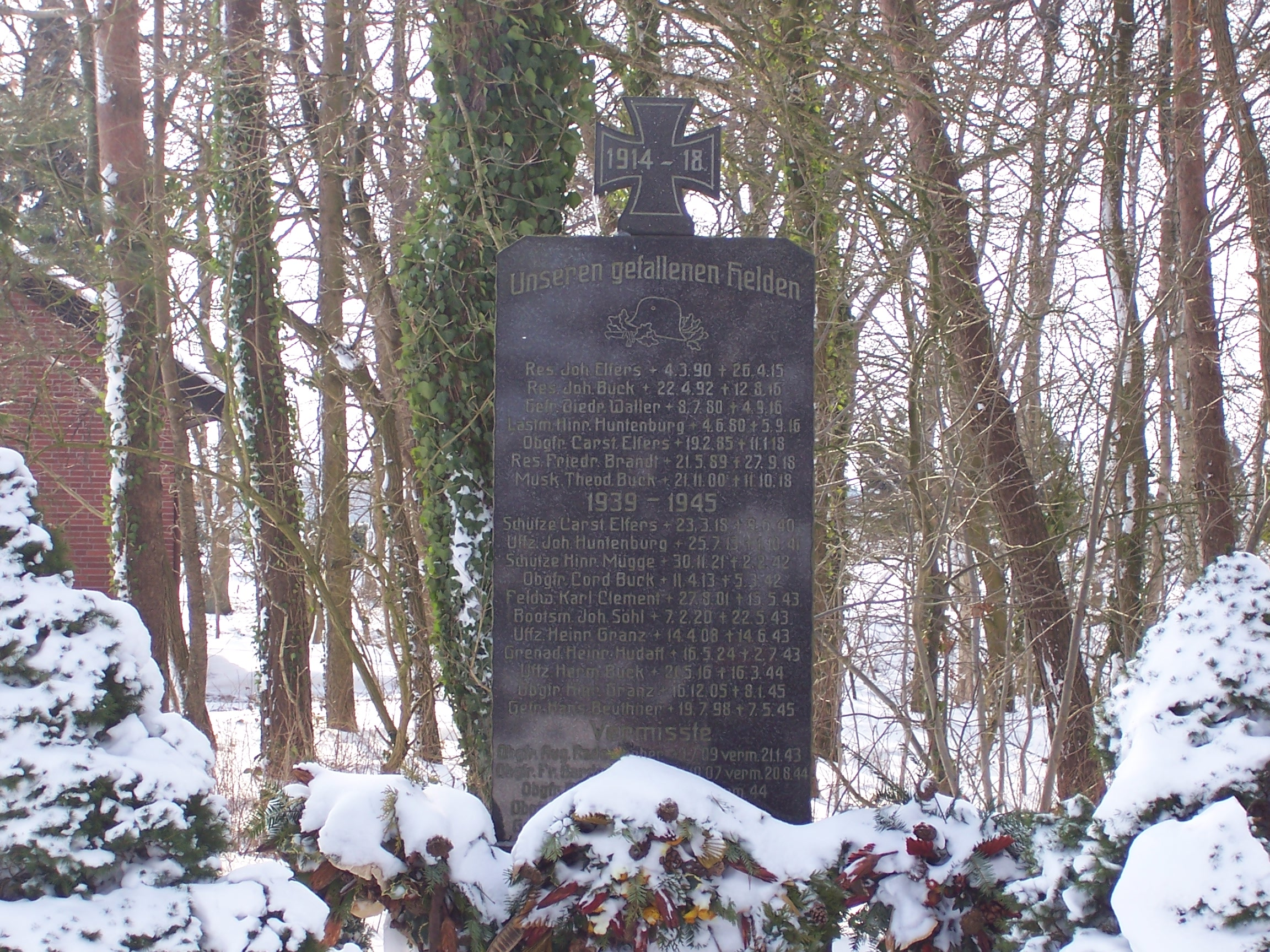
The War Memorial

At the village exit towards Oldendorf close to the cemetery is the War Memorial that commemorates the seven people killed in World War I and the 17 people killed in World War II. It was erected in 1921 on initiative of the veterans' association. The inaugural sermon was held by Oldendorf pastor Hittmeyer and was also attended by Oberstleutnant von Lahnstein from Stade.

The renewed and extended memorial commemorating the fallen of World War II was dedicated on 28 September 1952 with a sermon by pastor Bergens.

==== Community Center ====
The Dorfgemeinschaftshaus with an usable area of 255 m² was constructed between September 1988 and June 1989 close to the shooting range of the Schützenverein behind the former village pub.

== Commerce and Infrastructure ==
=== Transportation ===
Brobergen is connected with Gräpel and Kranenburg over Kreisstraße 82. This road ends at the Bundesstraße 73 in Burweg which leads to Stade and Cuxhaven and at the Bundesstraße 74 in Elm which leads to Bremervörde. Towards Oldendorf runs Kreisstraße 78 that leads to Himmelpforten again connecting the village to Bundesstraße 73. This is the most important connection to Stade and Hamburg.

The Oste river forms a natural barrier to the west. The ferry can overcome this barrier only in summer and due to bad road connections even in summer most traffic towards the west runs across the Oste bridges in Bremervörde and Hechthausen.

The next train station is in Himmelpforten which is used by commuters to Hamburg.

=== Economy ===
There are some farms and some smaller businesses in Brobergen. The village shop closed in 2002. Most grocery shopping is now done in Oldendorf and Himmelpforten.

There's a wind farm with six plants east of the village.

=== Media ===
The regional newspaper usually read in Brobergen is the Stader Tageblatt.

=== Education ===
A Volksschule in Brobergen was first mentioned in 1797 but likely it already existed before that time. The oldest school records are from 1845. There were 45 pupils then. 1919 this number had risen to 63. Brobergen's school closed on 1 December 1966 and pupils went to school in Gräpel and Estorf. For Realschule and Hauptschule pupils go to Oldendorf. For Gymnasium they attend Vincent-Lübeck-Schule in Stade.

=== Infrastructure ===
There's no central waste water clearing. Each household has its own packaged sewage treatment installation.

== People ==
Brobergen is the place of residence of the graphic artist Dieter Kalenbach.

== Literature ==
- Friedrich Holst: Roland und die Kraniche, Die Geschichte der Ostedörfer Kranenburg und Brobergen. 1983
- Lühmann, Bohmbach: Die Geest und Buxtehude, Urgeschichtsland zwischen Urstromtälern. 1984
- Chronik der Dörfer Brobergen und Kranenburg. 2005
