= Himmelpforten Abbey =

There are several abbeys in Germany with the name Himmelpforten ('Gates of Heaven'):

- Himmelpforten Monastery (Harz), in Hasserode near Wernigerode
- Himmelpforten Convent, in Himmelpforten, Stade district
- Himmelpforten Abbey (Möhnesee), near Ense on the Möhnesee lake

== See also ==
- Himmelpforten, a Lower Saxon municipality
