= Kranenburg =

Kranenburg may refer to:

- Kranenburg, North Rhine-Westphalia, a municipality in the district Cleves, North Rhine-Westphalia, Germany
- Kranenburg, Lower Saxony, a municipality in the district Stade, Lower Saxony, Germany
- Kranenburg (Netherlands), a village in the municipality of Bronckhorst, Netherlands
