= Seefried =

Seefried is a German surname. Notable people with the surname include:

- Chris Seefried (born 1966), American musician and singer
- Irmgard Seefried (1919–1988), Austrian opera singer
- Josh Seefried (born 1986), American LGBT rights activist and military pilot
- Kai Seefried (born 1978), German politician
- Kevin Seefried (born 1969), American drywall mechanic
- Marco Seefried (born 1976), German racing driver
- Mona Seefried (born 1957), Austrian actress

== See also ==
- Franz Joseph von Seefried (1904–1969), German nobleman and naturalist
- Ludmila Seefried-Matějková (born 1938), Czech painter and sculptor
