= Westerberg (Lamstedt) =

Coordinates: 53.665239°N 9.085436°E

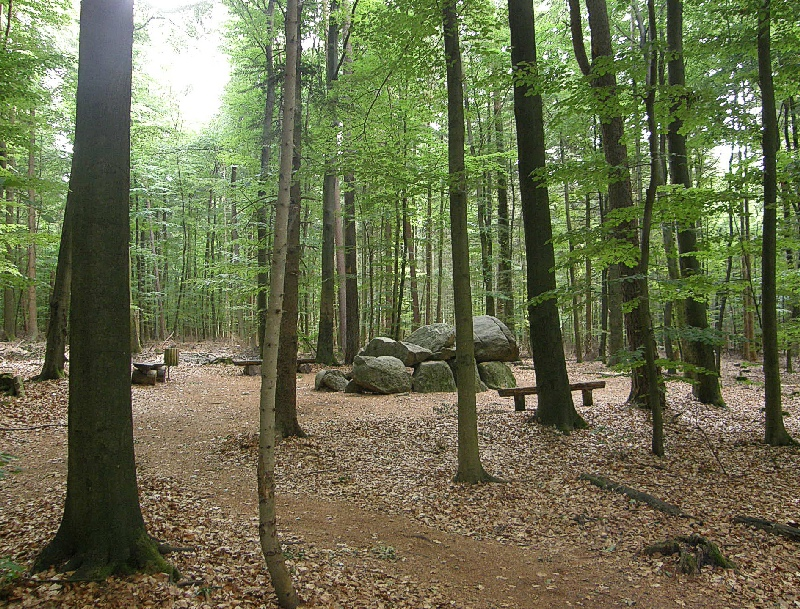
The Steinofen dolmen on the Westerberg

The Westerberg (i.e. western hill) in Rahden is a low ridge in Northern Germany in the north of the collective municipality of Börde Lamstedt in the state of Lower Saxony. It is covered with mixed forest and, like the nearby Wingst ridge, it is an end moraine from the Saale glaciation period. Together with the Wingst it forms part of the eastern boundary of Land Hadeln.

The Georgenhöhe ("George's Height") is its highest elevation at 66 metres (217 ft).

In the middle of the Westerberg woods are inter alia a megalithic grave or dolmen, the Steinofen and a "stone garden", a collection of 106 examples of glacial erratics. A nunnery that later moved to Himmelpforten was originally seated on the hill. The convent owned Westerberg hill with its forest.

The erratics are evidence of the impact of the ice age on the region.
