= Engelschoff =

- Municipality
- Coat of arms

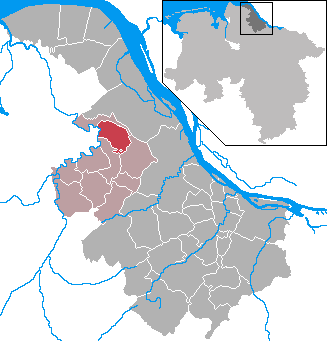
- Location of Engelschoff within Stade district
- Interactive map of Engelschoff
- Location within Germany Location within Lower Saxony
- Coordinates: 53°39′35″N 9°19′24″E
- Country: Germany
- State: Lower Saxony
- District: Stade
- Municipal assoc.: Oldendorf-Himmelpforten
- Subdivisions: 2

Government
  - Mayor: Heinz Düe

Area
  - Total: 19.69 km^{2} (7.60 sq mi)
- Elevation: 4 m (13 ft)

Population (2025-12-31)
  - Total: 754
  - Density: 38.3/km^{2} (99.2/sq mi)
- Time zone: UTC+01:00 (CET)
  - Summer (DST): UTC+02:00 (CEST)
- Postal codes: 21710
- Dialling codes: 04144
- Vehicle registration: STD
- Website: www.himmelpforten.de

Engelschoff is a municipality in the district of Stade, Lower Saxony, Germany.

== History ==
Engelschoff belonged to the Prince-Archbishopric of Bremen, established in 1180. The village was subject to the summary jurisdiction by the Porta Coeli convent of nuns in then Eulsete (now Himmelpforten). Engelschoff remained part of that jurisdiction also after the convent was transformed into the secular seigniorial Amt Himmelpforten in 1647.

In 1648 the Prince-Archbishopric was transformed into the Duchy of Bremen, which was first ruled in personal union by the Swedish Crown - interrupted by a Danish occupation (1712-1715) - and from 1715 on by the Hanoverian Crown. After a Prussian and then French occupation from 1806 to 1810, the ephemeric Kingdom of Westphalia annexed the Duchy, before France annexed it with effect of 1 January 1811.

In 1813 the Duchy was restored to the Electorate of Hanover, which - after its upgrade to the Kingdom of Hanover in 1814 - incorporated the Duchy in a real union and the Ducal territory, including Engelschoff within the Amt Himmelpforten, became part of the new Stade Region, established in 1823. Since in 1885 the Amt Himmelpforten merged in the new District of Stade Engelschoff forms part of it.
