= Mehe =

River in Lower Saxony, Germany

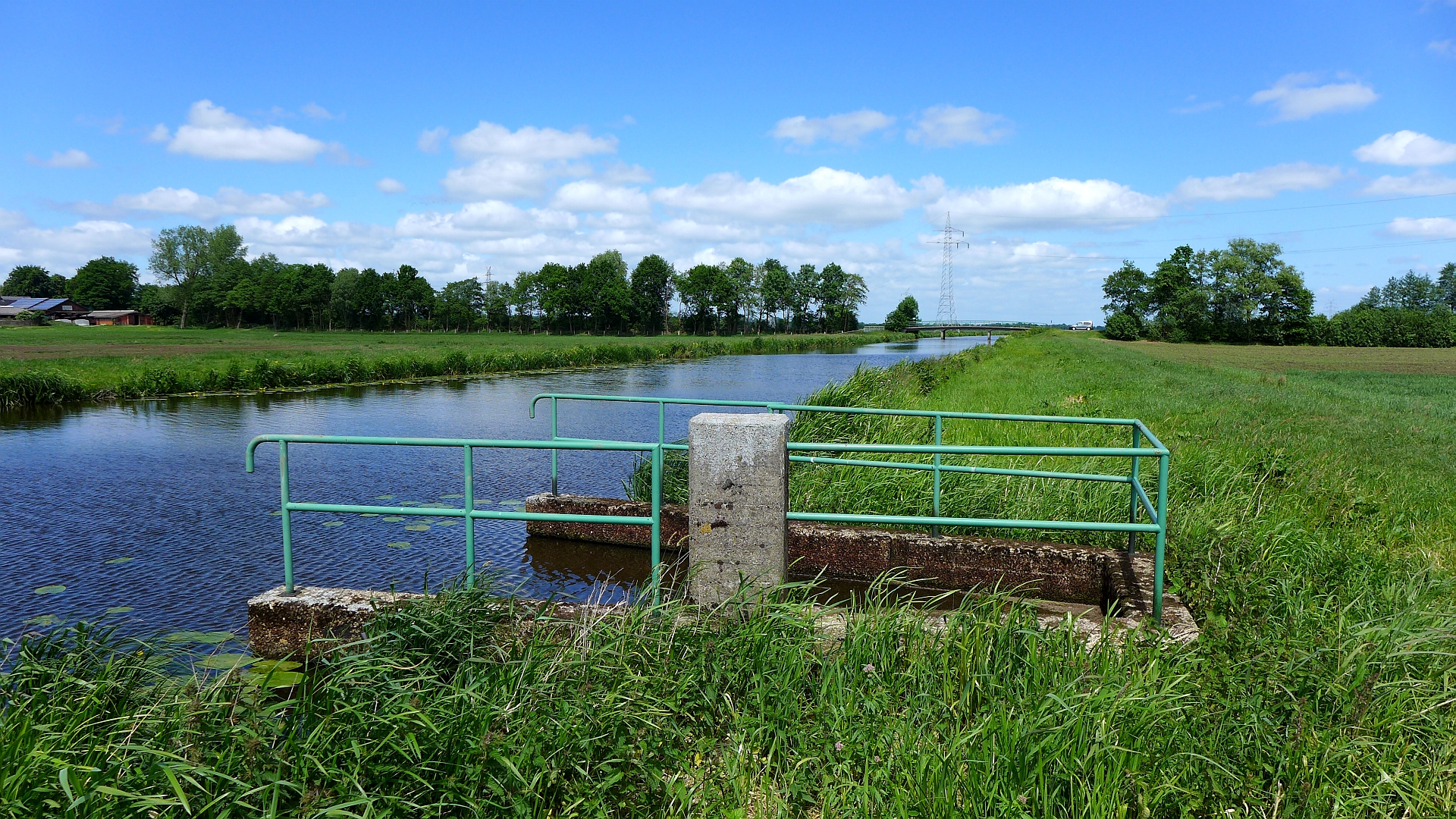

Location
- Country: Germany
- State: Lower Saxony

Physical characteristics
- Mouth
  - location: Oste
  - coordinates: 53.6012°N 9.1649°E
- Length: 21.8 km (13.5 mi)

Basin features
- Progression: Oste→ Elbe→ North Sea

The Mehe is a river in Lower Saxony, Germany. It flows into the Oste near Kranenburg.

== See also ==
- List of rivers of Lower Saxony
