= Kai Seefried =

German politician (born 1978)

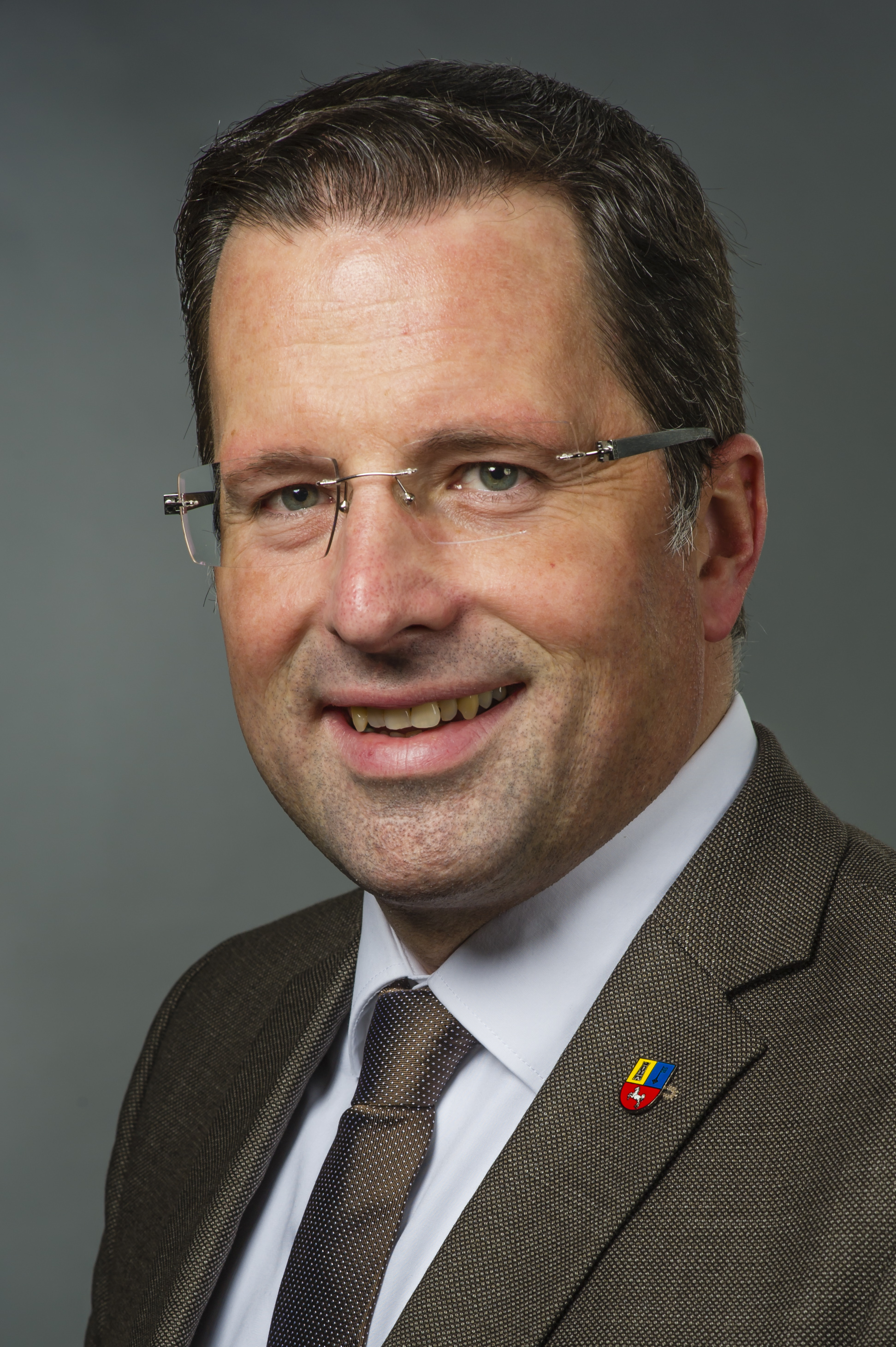
- Seefried in 2018

Landrat of Stade
- Incumbent
- Assumed office 1 November 2021
- Preceded by: Michael Roesberg

Member of the Landtag of Lower Saxony
- In office 26 February 2008 – 11 November 2021
- Preceded by: Karsten Behr
- Succeeded by: Tatjana Maier-Keil
- Constituency: Stade

Personal details
- Born: 23 January 1978 (age 48) Stade
- Party: Christian Democratic Union (since 1996)

Kai Seefried (born 23 January 1978) is a German politician serving as Landrat of Stade since 2021. From 2008 to 2021, he was a member of the Landtag of Lower Saxony.
