= Oldendorf-Himmelpforten =

- Samtgemeinde
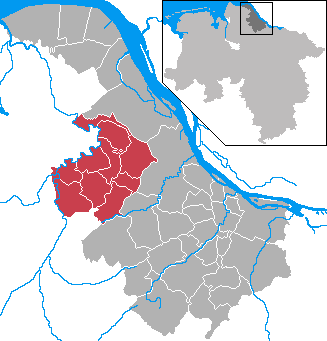
- Location of Oldendorf-Himmelpforten within Stade district
- Interactive map of Oldendorf-Himmelpforten
- Location within Germany Location within Lower Saxony
- Coordinates: 53°37′N 09°18′E
- Country: Germany
- State: Lower Saxony
- District: Stade
- Seat: Himmelpforten
- Subdivisions: 10 municipalities

Area
  - Total: 196.39 km^{2} (75.83 sq mi)

Population (2025-12-31)
  - Total: 18,485
  - Density: 94.124/km^{2} (243.78/sq mi)
- Time zone: UTC+01:00 (CET)
  - Summer (DST): UTC+02:00 (CEST)
- Website: www.fredenbeck.de

Oldendorf-Himmelpforten is a Samtgemeinde ("collective municipality") in the district of Stade, in Lower Saxony, Germany. It was formed on 1 January 2014 by the merger of the former Samtgemeinden Oldendorf and Himmelpforten. Its seat is in the village Himmelpforten.

The Samtgemeinde Oldendorf-Himmelpforten consists of the following municipalities:

1. Burweg
2. Düdenbüttel
3. Engelschoff
4. Estorf
5. Großenwörden
6. Hammah
7. Heinbockel
8. Himmelpforten
9. Kranenburg
10. Oldendorf

As of May 2022, the collective municipality had a population of 18,326. In April 2024, Oldendorf-Himmelpforten joint municipality introduced a four-day work week, becoming the first in the district of Stade to do so.
