= Lamstedt =

Lamstedt Loomst (Low Saxon)
- Municipality
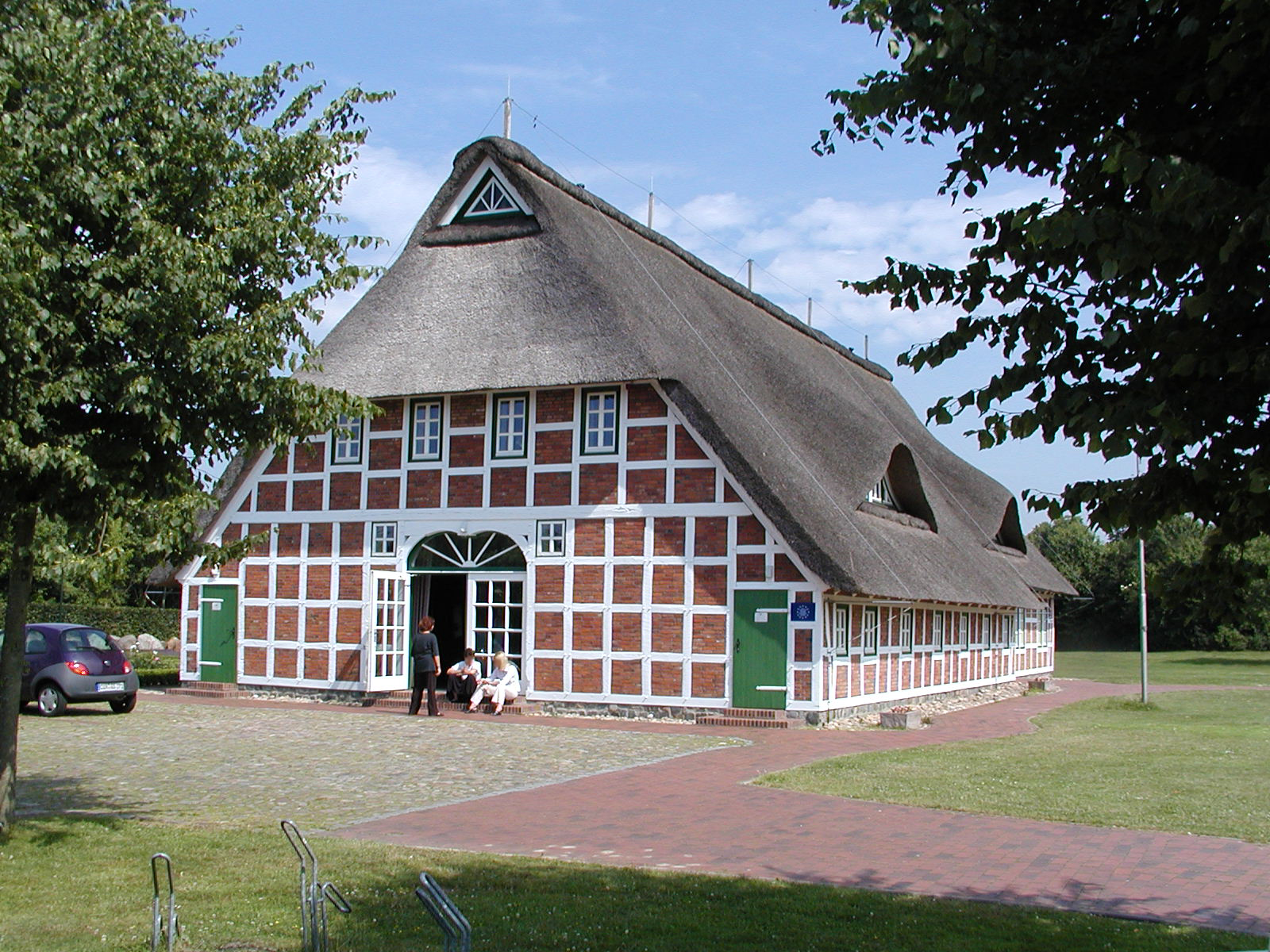
- Bördehuus museum

- Coat of arms

- Location of Lamstedt within Cuxhaven district
- Interactive map of Lamstedt
- Location within Germany Location within Lower Saxony
- Coordinates: 53°38′16″N 09°05′48″E
- Country: Germany
- State: Lower Saxony
- District: Cuxhaven
- Municipal assoc.: Börde Lamstedt
- Subdivisions: 6 Ortsteile

Government
  - Mayor: Manfred Knust (CDU)

Area
  - Total: 52.87 km^{2} (20.41 sq mi)
- Elevation: 25 m (82 ft)

Population (2025-12-31)
  - Total: 3,304
  - Density: 62.49/km^{2} (161.9/sq mi)
- Time zone: UTC+01:00 (CET)
  - Summer (DST): UTC+02:00 (CEST)
- Postal codes: 21769
- Dialling codes: 04773
- Vehicle registration: CUX
- Website: www.lamstedt.de

Lamstedt (German pronunciation: [ˈlamʃtɛt]; Low German: Loomst) is a municipality in the district of Cuxhaven, in Lower Saxony, Germany.

== Geography ==
The low ridge of the Westerberg an end moraine from the Saale glaciation period lies in the vicinity of Lamstedt's locality of Rahden.

=== Components of Lamstedt ===
Today's Lamstedt comprises the formerly independent municipalities of:

- Hackemühlen, in 1972 incorporated into Lamstedt
- Ihlbeck, in 1972 incorporated into Lamstedt
- Nindorf, in 1972 incorporated into Lamstedt
  - Seth, a locality of Nindorf of old
- Rahden, in 1929 incorporated into Hackemühlen
- Wohlenbeck, in 1972 incorporated into Lamstedt

== History ==
Lamstedt belonged to the Prince-Archbishopric of Bremen. In the mid-16th century the inhabitants adopted Lutheranism. During the Leaguist occupation under Tilly (1628–1630), they suffered from attempts of re-Catholicisation.

In 1648 the prince-archbishopric was transformed into the Duchy of Bremen, which was first ruled in personal union by the Swedish – interrupted by a Danish occupation (1712–1715) – and from 1715 on by the Hanoverian Crown. In 1807 the ephemeric Kingdom of Westphalia annexed the duchy, before France annexed it in 1810. In 1813 the duchy was restored to the Electorate of Hanover, which – after its upgrade to the Kingdom of Hanover in 1814 – incorporated the duchy in a real union and the ducal territory, including Lamstedt, became part of the Stade Region, established in 1823.

Claus Spreckels (1828–1908), a major industrialist in Hawai'i and in California (Spreckels Sugar Company bears his name) is born in Lamstedt. The Claus-Spreckels-Straße (street) in Lamstedt (Germany) named for Claus Spreckels.
