= Kranenburg, Lower Saxony =

Kranenburg
- Municipality
- Flag Coat of arms

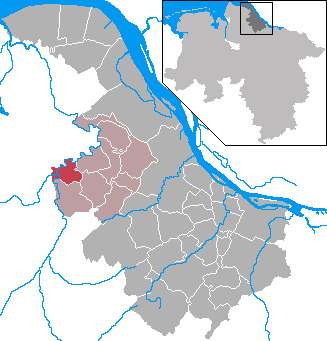
- Location of Kranenburg within Stade district
- Interactive map of Kranenburg
- Location within Germany Location within Lower Saxony
- Coordinates: 53°36′N 09°12′E
- Country: Germany
- State: Lower Saxony
- District: Stade
- Municipal assoc.: Oldendorf-Himmelpforten
- Subdivisions: 2

Government
  - Mayor: Horst Wartner

Area
  - Total: 14.18 km^{2} (5.47 sq mi)
- Elevation: 3 m (9.8 ft)

Population (2025-12-31)
  - Total: 750
  - Density: 53/km^{2} (140/sq mi)
- Time zone: UTC+01:00 (CET)
  - Summer (DST): UTC+02:00 (CEST)
- Postal codes: 21726
- Dialling codes: 04140
- Vehicle registration: STD
- Website: www.samtgemeinde-oldendorf.de

Kranenburg (German pronunciation: [ˈkʁaːnənbʊʁk]) is a municipality in the district Stade, Lower Saxony, Germany, lying on the river Oste. It consists of the villages Kranenburg and Brobergen and is part of the Samtgemeinde Oldendorf-Himmelpforten. It has a population of 772 as at December 31, 2003, of which 546 in Kranenburg and 226 in Brobergen.

Both villages lie on the right side of the Oste river, but part of the municipality lies on the left side, called "Hollander Höfe", which was the old ancestral seat of the gentry family "von Brobergen". There is a ferry in Brobergen crossing the Oste, connecting the "Hollander Höfe" with the village of Brobergen. It is a station of the "Deutsche Fährstraße".

The place lies on the border of the marshland near the Oste. The river Mehe, a tributary of the Oste, has its estuary near Brobergen.

The village Brobergen was an own municipality, but then got part of Kranenburg in the course of a reformation of municipality borders in Lower Saxony in 1972.

== History ==
Kranenburg, first mentioned in 1375 as Kronesborg (literally cranes castle), belonged to the Prince-Archbishopric of Bremen, established in 1180. While Brobergen was first the name of the landscape, which referred to a larger area along the Oste between Gräpel and Burweg. In a charter from 1141 it is said, that the Rudolf of Freckleben, as Rudolf II Count of Stade (from 1135 to his death in 1144), gave Brobergen as a fief to one of the three brothers Dudo, Adiko and Ricbert, after they founded the Benedictine Our Lady's Friary in Stade.

In 1286 it was first mentioned, that there was a village by the castle, which was the seat of the von Brobergen family. In 1380 the family von Mandelsloh and other Bremian and Verdian creditors tried to gain by violence the estates, which the bankrupt Prince-Archbishop Albert II pledged in return for credits. The creditors ravaged the city of Bremen and the entire Prince-Archbishopric of Bremen. The city of Bremen concluded a pact with the other cities, the Chapter, the Landsgemeinden of the free peasants of the marshlands, and indigenous families of nobility and ministerialis to fight the exfrediation by the von Mandelslohs. In 1381 the troops of the city of Bremen captured the castle in Kranenburg.

The family of von Brobergen, owning the castle, lasted until 1618, when it became extinct. At this time the manor was sold to merchants from Hamburg. In 1648 the Prince-Archbishopric, including Kranenburg, was transformed into the Duchy of Bremen, which was first ruled in personal union by the Swedish Crown – interrupted by a Danish occupation (1712–1715) – and from 1715 on by the Hanoverian Crown.

In 1807 the ephemeric Kingdom of Westphalia annexed the Duchy, before France annexed it in 1810. In 1813 the Duchy was restored to the Electorate of Hanover, which – after its upgrade to the Kingdom of Hanover in 1814 – incorporated the Duchy in a real union and the Ducal territory, including Kranenburg, became part of the new Stade Region, established in 1823. In 1837, after many changes of owner, the castle and the pertaining domain were purchased by the farmers of Brobergen, who pooled together to become free of the ownership of their land by other persons.
