= Großenwörden =

- Municipality
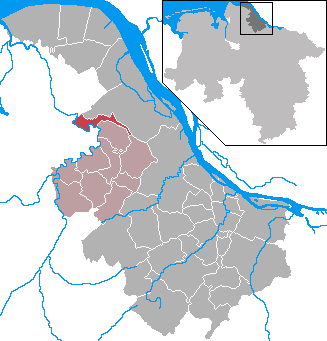
- Location of Großenwörden within Stade district
- Interactive map of Großenwörden
- Location within Germany Location within Lower Saxony
- Coordinates: 53°40′51″N 9°15′32″E
- Country: Germany
- State: Lower Saxony
- District: Stade
- Municipal assoc.: Oldendorf-Himmelpforten

Government
  - Mayor: Bernhard Witt

Area
  - Total: 12.35 km^{2} (4.77 sq mi)
- Elevation: 0 m (0 ft)

Population (2025-12-31)
  - Total: 487
  - Density: 39.4/km^{2} (102/sq mi)
- Time zone: UTC+01:00 (CET)
  - Summer (DST): UTC+02:00 (CEST)
- Postal codes: 21712
- Dialling codes: 04775
- Vehicle registration: STD
- Website: www.himmelpforten.de

Großenwörden is a municipality in the district of Stade, Lower Saxony, Germany.

== History ==
Großenwörden belonged to the Prince-Archbishopric of Bremen, established in 1180. On 1 May 1255 the village, then named Wörden, was mentioned in a deed of the Bremen Cathedral Chapter as subject to the tithe to and the summary jurisdiction by the Porta Coeli convent of nuns in then Eulsete (now Himmelpforten). Größenwörden remained part of that jurisdiction also after the convent was transformed into the secular seigniorial Amt Himmelpforten in 1647.

In 1648 the Prince-Archbishopric was transformed into the Duchy of Bremen, which was first ruled in personal union by the Swedish Crown - interrupted by a Danish occupation (1712-1715) - and from 1715 on by the Hanoverian Crown. After a Prussian and then French occupation from 1806 to 1810, the ephemeric Kingdom of Westphalia annexed the Duchy, before France annexed it with effect of 1 January 1811.

In 1813 the Duchy was restored to the Electorate of Hanover, which - after its upgrade to the Kingdom of Hanover in 1814 - incorporated the Duchy in a real union and the Ducal territory, including Großenwörden within the Amt Himmelpforten, became part of the new Stade Region, established in 1823. In 1852 Großenwörden became part of the Amt Osten, which merged into the Kreis Neuhaus an der Oste in 1885. In the course of the Prussian district reform of 1932 Großenwörden became part of the extended District of Stade.
