= Börde Lamstedt =

- Samtgemeinde
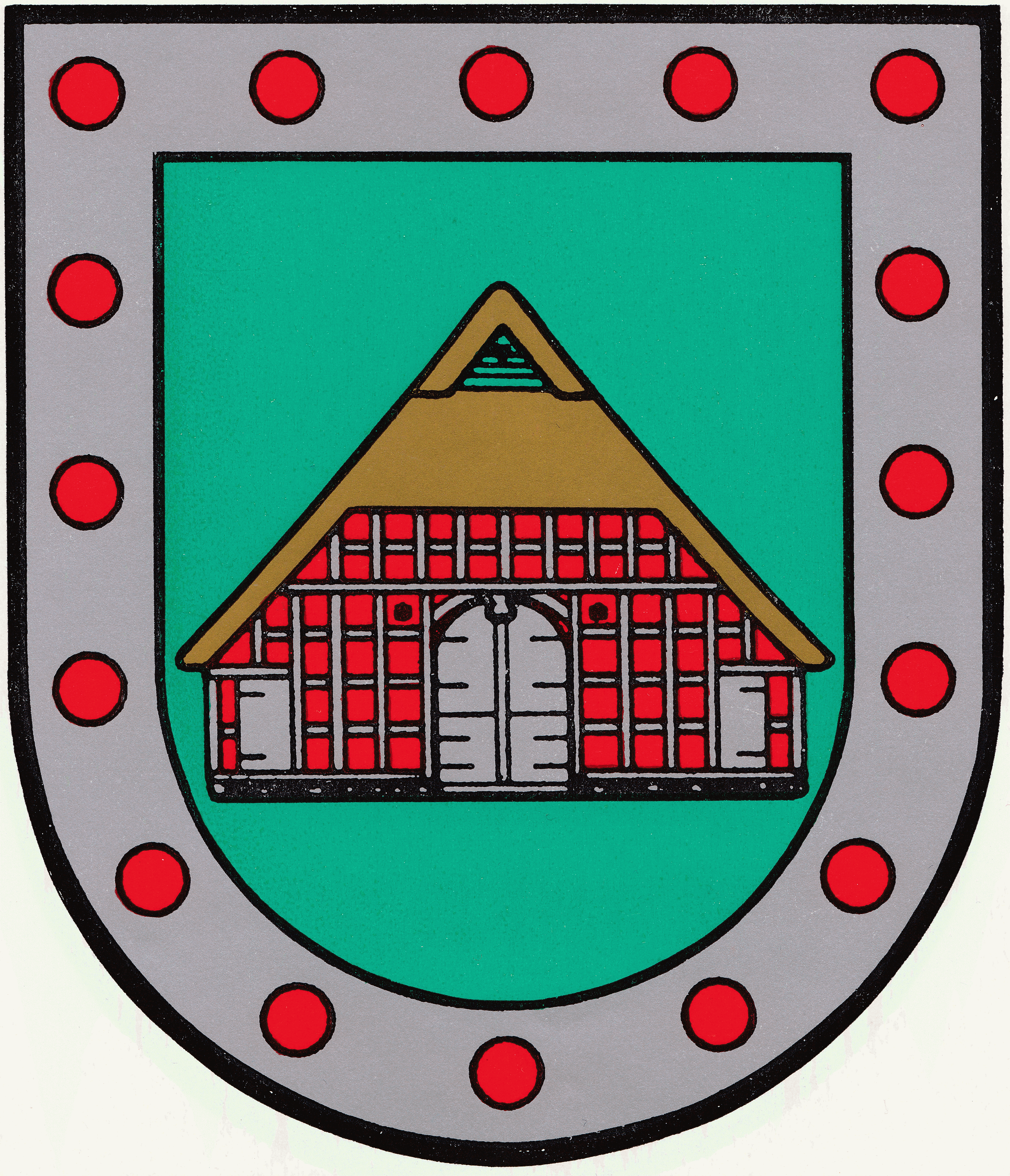
- Coat of arms

- Location of Börde Lamstedt within Cuxhaven district
- Interactive map of Börde Lamstedt
- Location within Germany Location within Lower Saxony
- Coordinates: 53°38′N 9°6′E
- Country: Germany
- State: Lower Saxony
- District: Cuxhaven
- Founded: 1963
- Subdivisions: 5 municipalities

Government
  - Mayor (2021–26): Holger Meyer

Area
  - Total: 177.61 km^{2} (68.58 sq mi)

Population (2025-12-31)
  - Total: 5,931
  - Density: 33.39/km^{2} (86.49/sq mi)
- Time zone: UTC+01:00 (CET)
  - Summer (DST): UTC+02:00 (CEST)
- Website: www.boerde-lamstedt.de

Börde Lamstedt is a Samtgemeinde ("collective municipality") in the district of Cuxhaven, in Lower Saxony, Germany. It is situated approximately 35 km east of Bremerhaven, and 15 km north of Bremervörde. Its seat is in the village Lamstedt.

The Samtgemeinde Börde Lamstedt consists of the following municipalities:

1. Armstorf
2. Hollnseth
3. Lamstedt
4. Mittelstenahe
5. Stinstedt
