= Düdenbüttel =

- Municipality
- Coat of arms

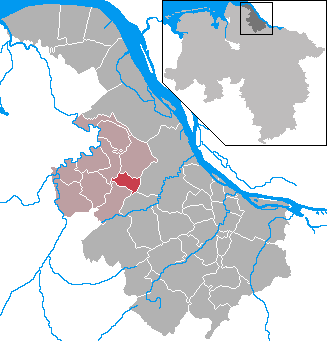
- Location of Düdenbüttel within Stade district
- Interactive map of Düdenbüttel
- Location within Germany Location within Lower Saxony
- Coordinates: 53°35′28″N 09°21′00″E
- Country: Germany
- State: Lower Saxony
- District: Stade
- Municipal assoc.: Oldendorf-Himmelpforten

Government
  - Mayor: Heinz Mügge

Area
  - Total: 10.18 km^{2} (3.93 sq mi)
- Elevation: 15 m (49 ft)

Population (2025-12-31)
  - Total: 1,019
  - Density: 100.1/km^{2} (259.3/sq mi)
- Time zone: UTC+01:00 (CET)
  - Summer (DST): UTC+02:00 (CEST)
- Postal codes: 21709
- Dialling codes: 04144
- Vehicle registration: STD
- Website: www.himmelpforten.de

Düdenbüttel is a municipality in the district of Stade, Lower Saxony, Germany.

== History ==
Düdenbüttel belonged to the Prince-Archbishopric of Bremen, established in 1180. Within the prince-archbishopric the village formed part of the Oldendorf jurisdiction (Börde Oldendorf). In 1648 the Prince-Archbishopric was transformed into the Duchy of Bremen, which was first ruled in personal union by the Swedish Crown - interrupted by a Danish occupation (1712-1715) - and from 1715 on by the Hanoverian Crown. The Danes had merged the Oldendorf jurisdiction including Düdenbüttel in the Amt Himmelpforten.

After a Prussian and then French occupation from 1806 to 1810, the ephemeric Kingdom of Westphalia annexed the Duchy, before France annexed it with effect of 1 January 1811. In 1813 the Duchy was restored to the Electorate of Hanover, which - after its upgrade to the Kingdom of Hanover in 1814 - incorporated the Duchy in a real union and the Ducal territory, including Düdenbüttel within the Amt Himmelpforten, became part of the new Stade Region, established in 1823. Since in 1885 the Amt Himmelpforten merged in the new District of Stade Düdenbüttel forms part of it.

== Religion ==
In ecclesiastical respect the Lutherans in Düdenbüttel are parishioners of the Himmelpforten Parish.
