= Bouches-de-l'Elbe =

Annexed department of the First French Empire

Bouches-de-l'Elbe Elbmündungen
- Department
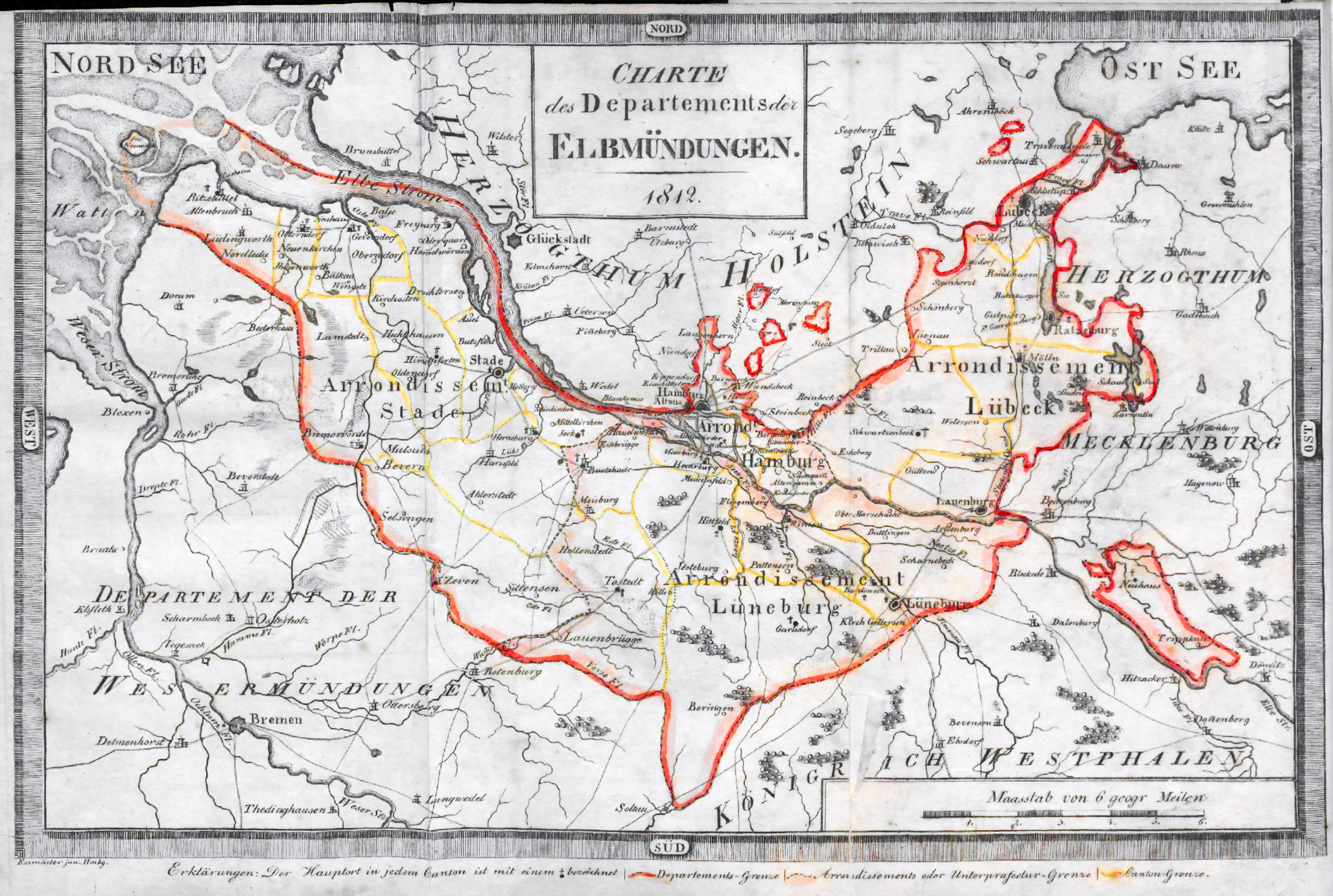
- Contemporary map (1812)

- Location of Bouches-de-l'Elbe in France (1812)
- Country: First French Empire
- Department: Bouches-de-l'Elbe

Bouches-de-l'Elbe (French pronunciation: [buʃ də lɛlb]; German: Elbmündungen, pronounced [ˈɛlpˌmʏndʊŋən]; both lit. 'Mouths of the Elbe') was a department of the First French Empire in present-day Germany that survived for three years. It was named after the mouth of the river Elbe. It was formed in 1811, when the region, originally belonging partially to Bremen-Verden (which in 1807 had been intermittently incorporated into the Kingdom of Westphalia), to Hamburg, Lübeck and Saxe-Lauenburg, was annexed by France. Its territory is part of the present-day German states of Lower Saxony, Schleswig-Holstein and Hamburg. Its capital was Hamburg.

The department was subdivided into four arrondissements and the following cantons (situation in 1812, French translated names where applicable):

- Hamburg (French: Hambourg), cantons: Hamburg (6 cantons), Bergedorf, Hamm and Wilhelmsburg.
- Lübeck (French: Lubeck), cantons: Lübeck (2 cantons), Lauenburg upon Elbe, Mölln, Neuhaus upon Elbe, Ratzeburg, Schwarzenbek and Steinhorst.
- Lüneburg (French: Lunebourg), cantons: Lüneburg, Bardowick, Buxtehude, Garlstorf, Harburg, Hittfeld, Tostedt and Winsen upon Luhe.
- Stade, cantons: Stade, Bremervörde, Freiburg upon Elbe, Himmelpforten, Horneburg, Neuhaus upon Oste, Otterndorf, Ritzebüttel, Jork and Zeven.

Its population in 1812 was 375,976.

After Napoleon was defeated in 1814, the department were dissolved and the area was redivided between the Kingdom of Hanover (Bremen-Verden), the Duchy of Saxe-Lauenburg, and the free cities of Hamburg and Lübeck.
