= German Ferry Road =

Coordinates: 53°47′41″N 9°24′11″E

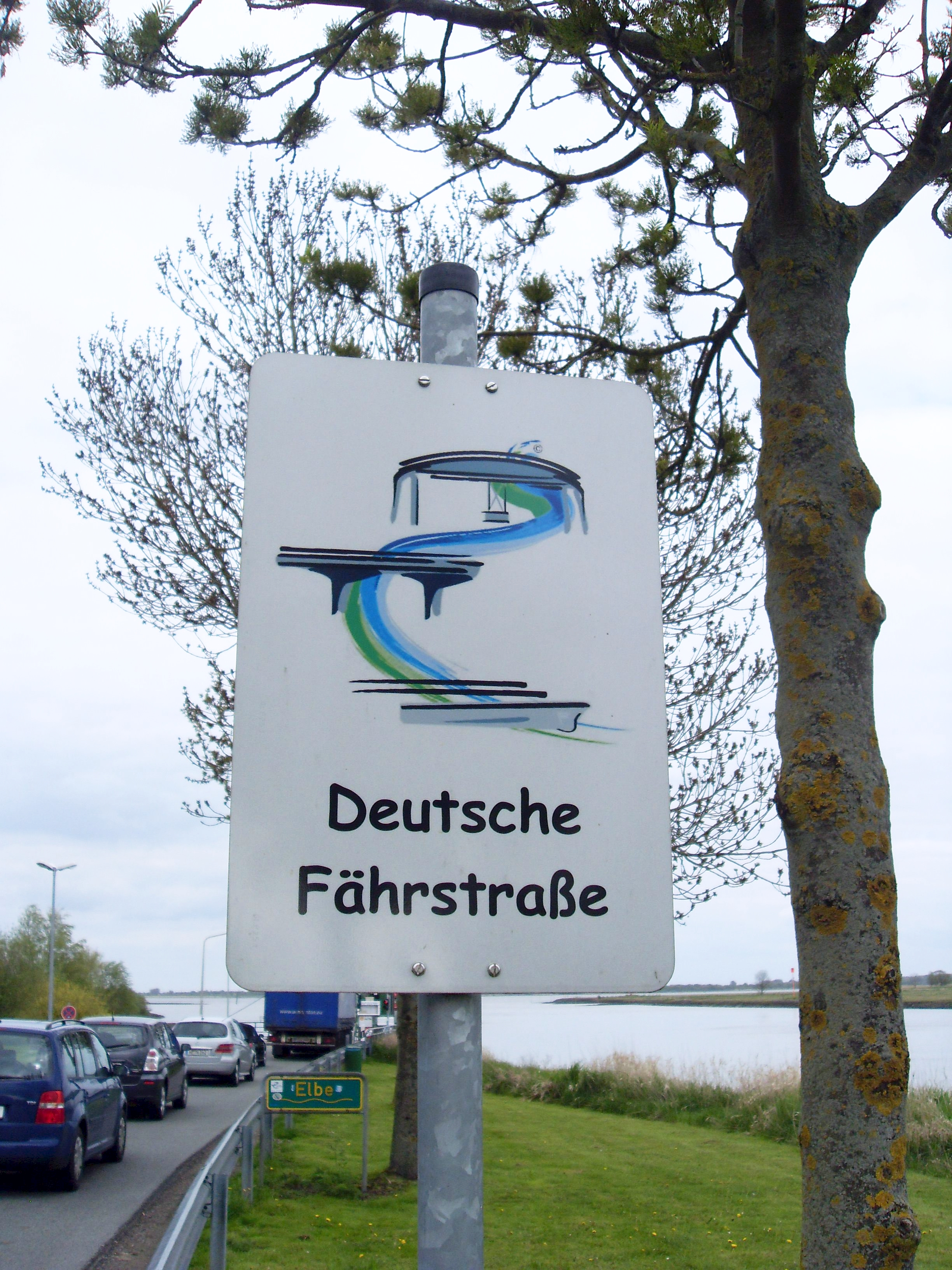
Sign and part of the Deutsche Fährstraße at river Elbe close to the ferry Glückstadt - Wischhafen

The Deutsche Fährstraße (German Ferry Street), established in May 2004, is a theme route similar to the American National Scenic Byways. It connects various places between Bremervörde and Kiel with relation to the history of ferries and crossing of rivers, like the historic transporter bridges in Rendsburg and Osten.

It is 250 km long and connects 50 bridges, sluices, barrages and ferries and demonstrates all variations of methods crossing water. It contains parts of the rivers Oste, Elbe, the Kiel Canal and the Bay of Kiel.
