= Himmelpforten =

Himmelpforten Himmelpoorten
- Municipality
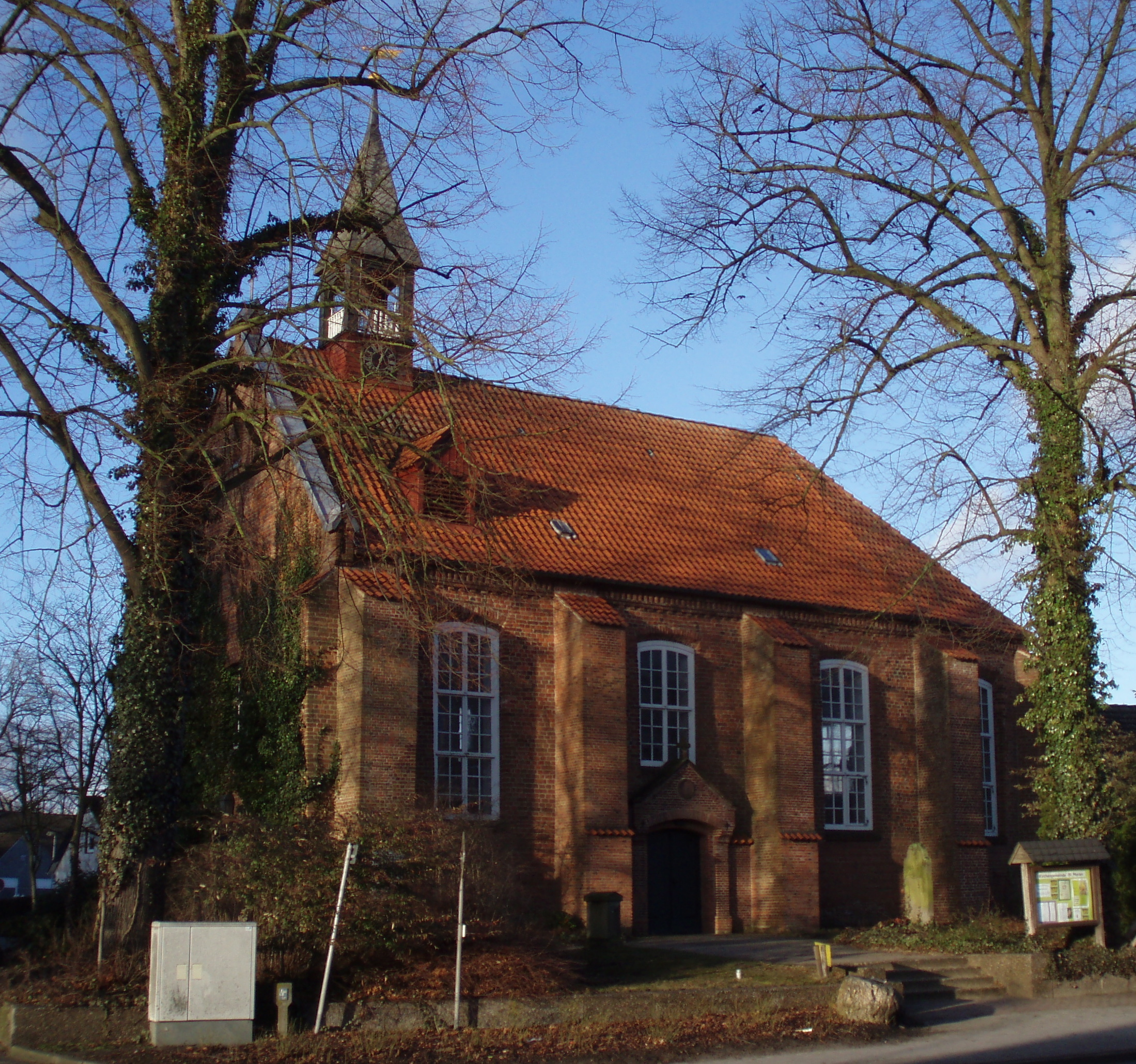
- Evangelical Lutheran St. Mary's Church

- Flag Coat of arms

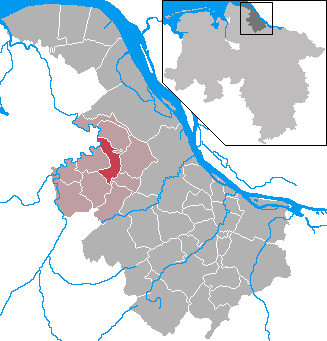
- Location of Himmelpforten within Stade district
- Interactive map of Himmelpforten
- Location within Germany Location within Lower Saxony
- Coordinates: 53°37′N 9°18′E
- Country: Germany
- State: Lower Saxony
- District: Stade
- Municipal assoc.: Oldendorf-Himmelpforten
- Subdivisions: 3

Government
  - Mayor: Lothar Wille (SPD)

Area
  - Total: 18.29 km^{2} (7.06 sq mi)
- Elevation: 6 m (20 ft)

Population (2025-12-31)
  - Total: 5,159
  - Density: 282.1/km^{2} (730.5/sq mi)
- Time zone: UTC+01:00 (CET)
  - Summer (DST): UTC+02:00 (CEST)
- Postal codes: 21709
- Dialling codes: 04144
- Vehicle registration: STD
- Website: www.himmelpforten.de

Himmelpforten (Low Saxon: Himmelpoorten) is a municipality west of Hamburg (Germany) in the district of Stade in Lower Saxony. It is located on the Horsterbeck creek. Himmelpforten is also part and the seat of the Samtgemeinde ("collective municipality") Oldendorf-Himmelpforten.

== History ==
Himmelpforten belonged to the Prince-Archbishopric of Bremen. The families von Brobergen and von Haseldorf had donated a Cistercian nunnery in Rahden near Lamstedt. In 1255 it moved to Himmelpforten, then named Eulsete. The Himmelpforten Convent used to be called in Latin: Porta Coeli (heaven's gate), which became the place's name Himmelpoorten (in Low Saxon) or Himmelpforten (in High German) respectively. The church of the nunnery was also used as a parish church. The nuns elected a provost, first mentioned in 1255 (a certain Albert), who had the privilege to nominate priests to the churches in the Himmelpforten parish, to wit the churches in Himmelpforten itself, in Großenwörden, Hechthausen and in Horst upon Oste.

Nunneries had traditionally been institutions to provide unmarried daughters of the better off, who couldn't be provided a husband befitting their social status or who didn't want to marry, with a decent livelihood. So when an unmarried woman of that status joined a nunnery she would bestow earning assets (real estate) or – restricted to her lifetime – regular revenues paid by her male relatives, on the nunnery, making up in the former case part of the nunnery's estates.

In 1556 Himmelpforten's then Lutheran Provost Segebade II von der Hude appointed the first Lutheran pastor, Peter Schlichting, in Himmelpforten. When in the mid-16th century the majority of the population in the Prince-Archbishopric adopted Lutheranism, the function of the nunnery, to provide sustenance for unmarried women, wasn't to be given up. So the formerly Roman Catholic nunnery of Himmelpforten with its estates was turned into a Lutheran foundation (German: das Stift, more particular: Frauenstift, literally in English: Damsels' foundation).

During the Leaguist occupation under Johan 't Serclaes, Count of Tilly (1628-1630), the administrator regnant of the Bremian See, John Frederick had to agree to Catholic visitations in the nunneries. By November 1629 the Roman Catholic visitors issued an ultimatum to the prioress of the Lutheran conventuals to convert to Catholicism or to leave the nunnery.

No conversion had been recorded, so on 6 August 1630 all Lutheran conventuals left, the day before their announced forced eviction from the nunnery. In accordance with the Edict of Restitution the estates of Himmelpforten's nunnery were then bestowed to the Catholic Jesuits, in order to finance them and their missioning in the course of the Counter-Reformation in the Prince-Archbishopric. The expelled conventuals were denied restitution of the real estate which they bestowed on the nunnery when they had entered it.

After the Leaguist troops left Himmelpforten, the Lutheran conventuals returned and elected a new provost in 1638, Casper Schulte. After the Swedes had occupied Himmelpforten in 1645, on 27 October 1647 Queen Christina of Sweden promised Himmelpforten's nunnery and its estates to Count Gustaf Adolf Lewenhaupt as a fief heritable in the male line (Mannlehen).

On 30 July 1651 Lewenhaupt was officially invested with the nunnery, while the eleven still remaining conventuals under Prioress Gertrud von Campe were to be supplied a livelihood until their death. New conventuals were not to be accepted anymore. Since the enfeoffment of Lewenhaupt the estates and jurisdictions of the Himmelpforten Convent formed the seigniorial Amt Himmelpforten, seated in Himmelpforten.

In 1648 the Prince-Archbishopric was transformed into the Duchy of Bremen, which was first ruled in personal union by the Swedish Crown - interrupted by a Danish occupation (1712-1715) - and from 1715 on by the Hanoverian Crown. After a Prussian and then French occupation from 1806 to 1810, the ephemeric Kingdom of Westphalia annexed the Duchy in 1810, replacing the Amt Himmelpforten by the Canton of Stade and Himmelpforten, established on 1 September 1810 and seated in Stade. With effect of 1 January 1811 France annexed all the South Elbian German coast and its hinterland and the area of the former Amt Himmelpforten formed part of the Himmelpforten-based Canton de Himmelpforten in the Bouches-de-l'Elbe Department.

In 1813 the Duchy was restored to the Electorate of Hanover, which - after its upgrade to the Kingdom of Hanover in 1814 - incorporated the Duchy in a real union and the ducal territory, including the restituted Amt Himmelpforten with Himmelpforten, became part of the new Stade Region, established in 1823. Since in 1885 the Amt Himmelpforten merged in the new District of Stade Himmelpforten forms part of it.

Himmelpforten is one of Germany's oldest Weihnachtspostämter or Christmas Post Offices, to which children can write letters to Santa and volunteers send responses.

== Name ==
When in 1255 the Conventus Porta Coeli moved to Himmelpforten it still bore the name Eylsede/ Eulsete (literally: Eylo's/Eilhard's seat). The Latin name Porta Coeli (English: Gate of Heaven) refers to the Christian imagery of Mary of Nazareth as the Gate of Heaven derived from Ezekiel's "closed gate" (Ezekiel 44:2–3), considered to have been opened by Mary as an incarnation of this prophecy. Eylsede later adopted the Low Saxon translation tor Hemmelporten or to der Himilporten of the convent's Latin name, now given in modern Low Saxon as Himmelpoorten and in standard High German as Himmelpforten.

== Components of Himmelpforten ==
Today's Himmelpforten comprises the following localities and formerly independent municipalities:

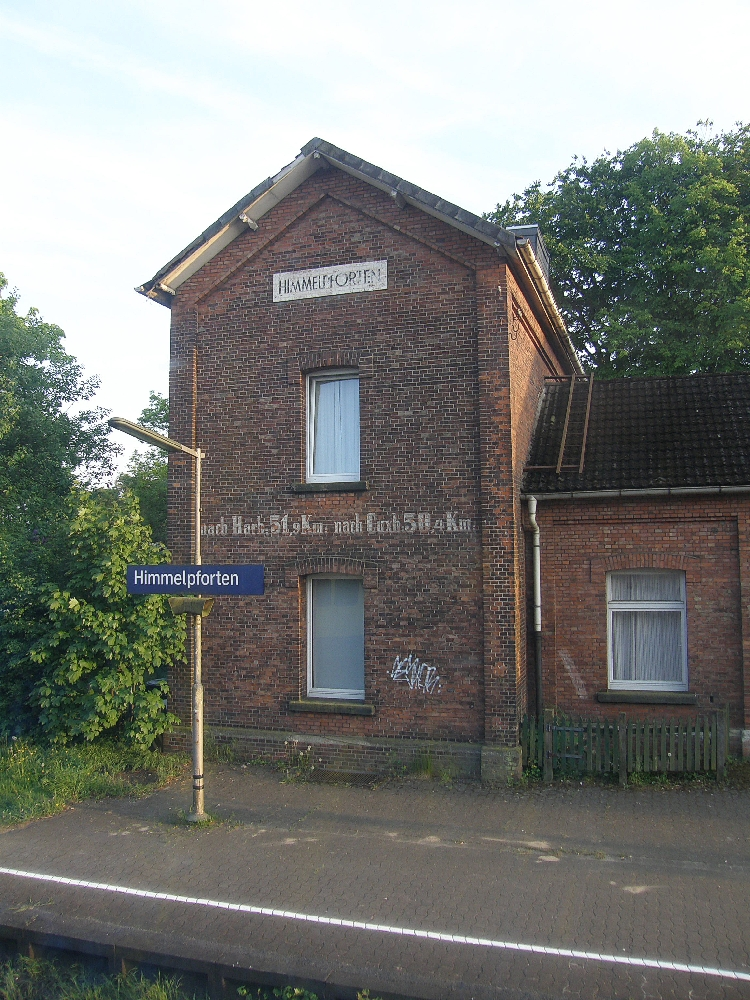
Himmelpforten station is almost at the middle of the Niederelbebahn.

- Breitenwisch (Low Saxon: Bredenwisch), since 1972 a locality of Himmelpforten
- Kuhla (Low Saxon: Kuhla), since 1972 a locality of Himmelpforten
- Löhe (Low Saxon: Löh), a locality of Himmelpforten of old
- Neukuhla (Low Saxon: Neekuhla), a locality of Himmelpforten of old
- Ochsenpohl (Low Saxon: Ossenpohl), a locality of Himmelpforten of old
- Ramels (Low Saxon: Ramels), a locality of Himmelpforten of old

== Traffic ==
Himmelpforten is connected by the B 73 highway with the net of federal routes. Since 1 July 1881 the town is connected to the railway net with Himmelpforten station located almost at the middle of the Niederelbebahn line with 51.9 kilometres (32.2 mi) towards Hamburg-Harburg station and 50.9 kilometres (31.6 mi) towards Cuxhaven station.
