= Stade (district) =

District in Lower Saxony, Germany

Coordinates: 53°35′N 9°25′E

- District
- Flag Coat of arms
- Country: Germany
- State: Lower Saxony
- Capital: Stade

Government
  - District admin.: Kai Seefried (CDU)

Area
  - Total: 1,266 km^{2} (489 sq mi)

Population (31 December 2025)
  - Total: 207,935
  - Density: 164.2/km^{2} (425.4/sq mi)
- Time zone: UTC+01:00 (CET)
  - Summer (DST): UTC+02:00 (CEST)
- Vehicle registration: STD
- Website: landkreis-stade.de

Stade is a district (Landkreis) in Lower Saxony, Germany. It has its seat in Stade and is part of the Hamburg Metropolitan Region.

== History ==
The district of Stade was established in 1932 by merging three smaller precursor districts.

== Geography ==
=== Location ===
The district is situated at the southern banks of the Elbe river, between the city of Hamburg and the river's mouth. The western border of the district is the Oste, a narrow tributary of the Elbe. The land between the Oste and the town of Stade is traditionally called Kehdingen. The area to the east of Stade is known as the Altes Land (literally "Old Land"). It is characterised by thousands of fruit trees.

=== Bordering districts ===
It is surrounded by (from the north and clockwise) the Schleswig-Holstein districts Dithmarschen, Steinburg and Pinneberg (all on the other side of the Elbe river), the city-state of Hamburg as well as the Lower Saxony districts Harburg, Rotenburg and Cuxhaven.

== Coat of arms ==
The coat of arms displays:

- a castle, symbolising Stade as the former seat of the Counts of Stade
- the key from the arms of the Archbishopric of Bremen, to which the area once belonged
- a white horse, representing Hanover and Lower Saxony

== Towns and municipalities ==
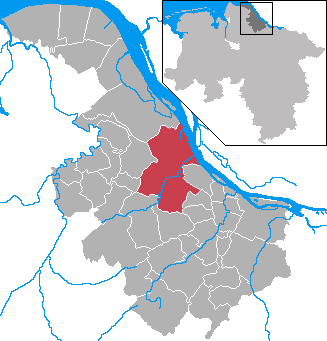
Clickable map of towns and municipalities in the district

Cities	Samtgemeinden
1. Buxtehude; 2. Stade; Free municipalities: 1. Drochtersen; 2. Jork	1. Apensen; 1. Apensen^{1}; 2. Beckdorf; 3. Sauensiek; 2. Fredenbeck; 1. Deinste; 2. Fredenbeck^{1}; 3. Kutenholz; 3. Harsefeld; 1. Ahlerstedt; 2. Bargstedt; 3. Brest; 4. Harsefeld^{1}	4. Horneburg; 1. Agathenburg; 2. Bliedersdorf; 3. Dollern; 4. Horneburg^{1}; 5. Nottensdorf; 5. Lühe; 1. Grünendeich; 2. Guderhandviertel; 3. Hollern-Twielenfleth; 4. Mittelnkirchen; 5. Neuenkirchen; 6. Steinkirchen^{1}	6. Nordkehdingen; 1. Balje; 2. Freiburg^{1}; 3. Krummendeich; 4. Oederquart; 5. Wischhafen; 7. Oldendorf-Himmelpforten; 1. Burweg; 2. Düdenbüttel; 3. Engelschoff; 4. Estorf; 5. Großenwörden; 6. Hammah; 7. Heinbockel; 8. Himmelpforten^{1}; 9. Kranenburg; 10. Oldendorf
	^{1}seat of the Samtgemeinde

== Transport ==
Logo of the transport association HVV

Stade district is located in the area of the transport association Hamburger Verkehrsverbund (HVV).
