= Bundesautobahn 26 =

Federal motorway in Germany

A 26
- Bundesautobahn 26

Route information
- Length: 50 km (31 mi)
- Existed: 2002–present

Location
- Country: Germany
- States: Lower Saxony, Hamburg

Highway system
- Roads in Germany; Autobahns; List; Federal; List; State; E-roads
← A 25	→ A 27

Bundesautobahn 26 (translates from German as Federal Motorway 26, short form Autobahn 26, abbreviated as BAB 26 or A 26) is an autobahn in northwestern Germany. Construction of a first, 12-kilometre-long (7.5 mi) section started 2002 and was opened on 23 October 2008.

== Opened section ==
The first section between Stade and Horneburg started construction in 2002. It was opened gradually between 5 August and 23 October 2008.

Part of the second section connecting Horneburg with Jork was finished mid 2014 but open only to west bound motor bikes and passenger cars since 28 November 2014 and east bound since 17 July 2015.

The remaining stretch of the second section crosses the river Este. It has been opened with the third section.

Second section supposed to connect Jork with Buxtehude however in Buxtehude only the exits from highway without driveways has been built.

The third section connects Jork with Neu Wulmstorf/Rübke. First construction started 5 September 2013. It has been opened since February 2023. However access to motorway is allowed only from/to the south.

The third section supposed to connect Buxtehude with Neu Wulmstorf/Rübke however in Buxtehude only the exits from highway without driveways has been built.

== Construction ==
Section four connecting A26 to A7 on Hamburg territory at a new interlink 'Hamburg-Süderelbe' started 2019 and is planned to finish by 2026.

== Planning phase ==
A fifth section is planned to connect Stade with Drochtersen and the planned extension of the A20 across the river Elbe.

The so-called 'Hafenpassage' is planned as an east–west connection south of the Elbe between A7, A253 and A1. It will involve a new bridge to replace the aging Köhlbrand Bridge.

== Exit list ==
State	District	Location	km	mi	Exit	Name	Destinations	Notes
Lower Saxony	Stade	Drochtersen	116	72	1	Drochtersen	B 495 – Wischhafen, Freiburg, Hemmoor, Bremervörde	proposed end of the road
Lower Saxony	Stade	Drochtersen	115.1	71.5	2	Kehdingen interchange	A 20 – Bremerhaven, Lübeck	interchange proposed
Lower Saxony	Stade	Stade	111.5	69.3	Kehdingen parking area			
Lower Saxony	Stade	Stade	104.7	65.1	3	Stade-Nord	Stade	interchange proposed
Lower Saxony	Stade	Stade			Schwinge tunnel (Length: 82 m (269 ft))			
Lower Saxony	Stade	Stade	100	62	Fixed point to connect with currently built part of A 26			
Lower Saxony	Stade	Stade	1.5	0.93	4	Stade-Süd	B 73 – Hamburg, Cuxhaven, Ottenbeck	
Lower Saxony	Stade	Stade	2.7	1.7	5	Stade-Ost	Stade	
Lower Saxony	Stade	Dollern	8.2	5.1	6	Dollern	Dollern, Steinkirchen	
Lower Saxony	Stade	Horneburg			Lühe bridge (Length: 176 m (577 ft))			
Lower Saxony	Stade	Horneburg	12	7.5	7	Horneburg	Horneburg, Neuenkirchen	
Lower Saxony	Stade	Jork	16.6	10.3	8	Jork	Jork, Buxtehude-Neukloster, B 73 – Hamburg	
Lower Saxony	Stade	Buxtehude			Este bridge (Length: 200 m (656 ft))			
Lower Saxony	Stade	Buxtehude	21.7	13.5	9	Buxtehude	Buxtehude	
Lower Saxony	Harburg	Neu Wulmstorf	25	16	10	Neu Wulmstorf	B 3n – Neu Wulmstorf	
Hamburg	Harburg	Altenwerder			Hafenbahn tunnel (Length: 200 m (656 ft)) under construction			
Hamburg	Harburg	Altenwerder	34	21	11	Hamburg-Hafen interchange	A 7 / E45 – Hamburg-Mitte, Hamburg-Altona, Seevetal, Hanover, Kiel, Flensburg	interchange under construction
Hamburg	Harburg	Moorburg	36	22	12	Hamburg-Moorburg	Moorburg	interchange proposed
Hamburg	Harburg	Moorburg			Süderelbe bridge (Length: 535 m (1,535 ft))			
Hamburg	Hamburg-Mitte	Hohe Schaar	39	24	13	Hamburg-Hohe Schaar	Hohe Schaar	interchange proposed
Hamburg	Hamburg-Mitte	Hohe Schaar			Reiherstieg bridge			
Hamburg	Hamburg-Mitte	Wilhelmsburg	42	26	14	Harburg interchange	B 75 – Wilhelmsburg, Rotenburg, Harburg	interchange proposed
Hamburg	Hamburg-Mitte	Wilhelmsburg			Finkenriek tunnel (Length: 1.4 km (0.87 mi))			
Hamburg	Hamburg-Mitte	Wilhelmsburg	43	27	15	Hamburg-Stillhorn	Stillhorn, Wilhelmsburg	interchange proposed, integrated into the Finkenriek tunnel
Hamburg	Hamburg-Mitte	Wilhelmsburg	44	27	16	Hamburg-Stillhorn three-way interchange	A 1 / E22 – Bremen, Hanover, Lübeck, Berlin, Hamburg center	interchange proposed, proposed end of the road, integrated into the Finkenriek tunnel
1.000 mi = 1.609 km; 1.000 km = 0.621 mi: Proposed
