= Schwiederstorf =

- Ortsteil of Neu Wulmstorf
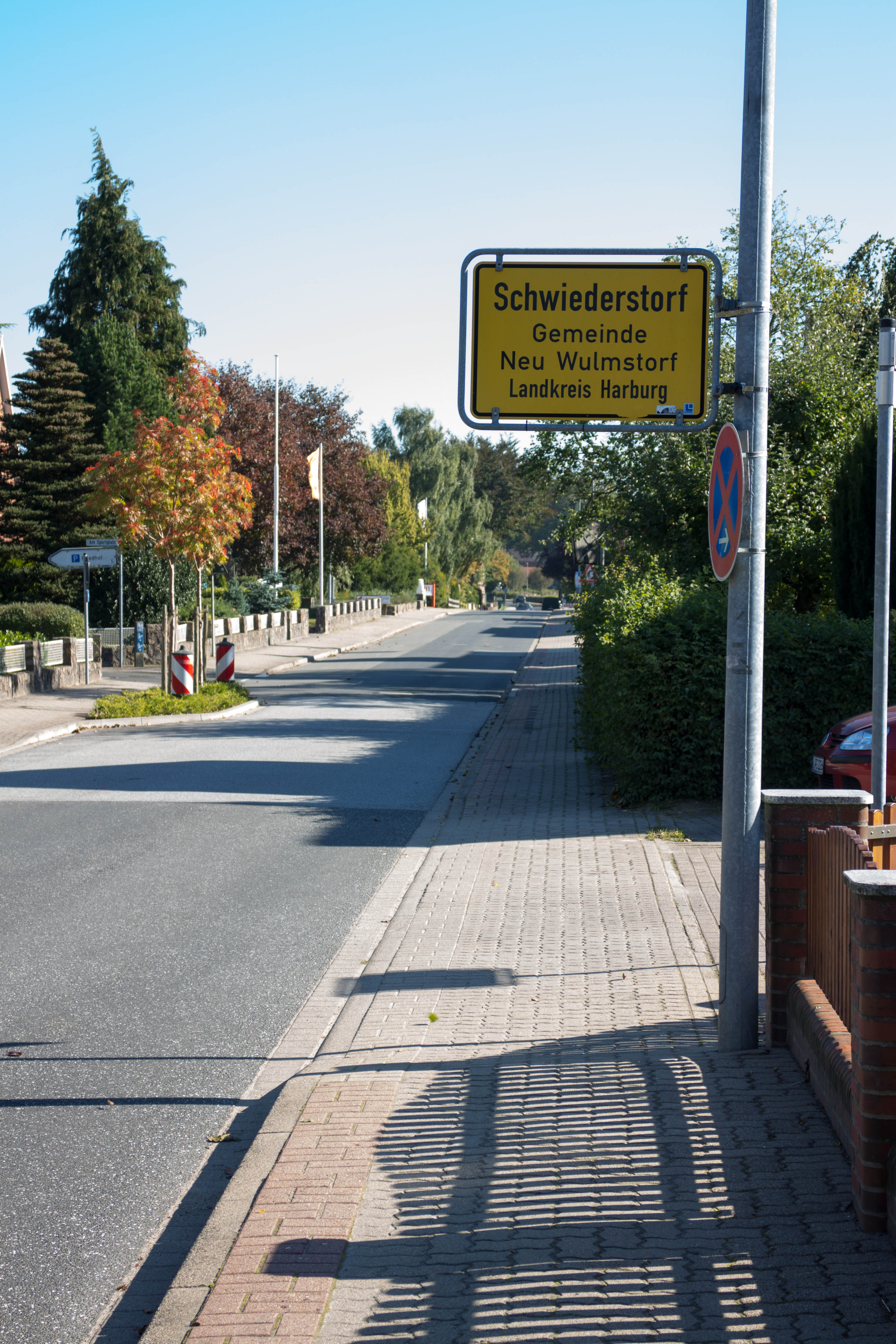

- Coat of arms
- Interactive map of Schwiederstorf
- Location within Germany Location within Lower Saxony
- Coordinates: 53°25′19″N 9°47′51″E
- Country: Germany
- State: Lower Saxony
- District: Harburg
- Municipality: Neu Wulmstorf
- Elevation: 46–67 m (151–220 ft)

Population (2016)
  - Total: 922
- Time zone: UTC+01:00 (CET)
  - Summer (DST): UTC+02:00 (CEST)
- Postal codes: 21629
- Dialling codes: 04168

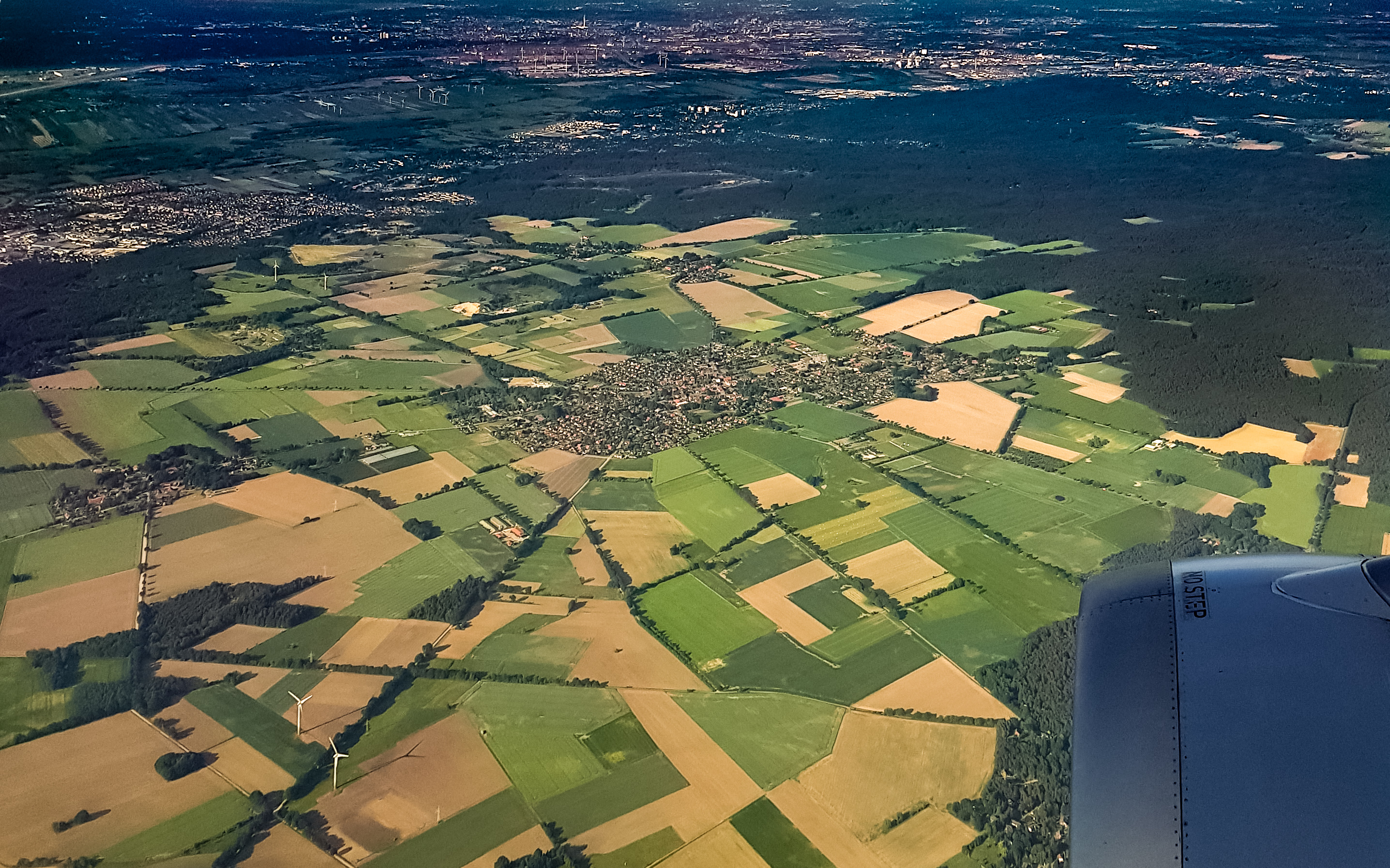
Aerial photograph of Elstorf, Schwiederstorf and Ardestorf with Neu Wulmstorf and Hamburg in the background

Schwiederstorf (German pronunciation: [ˈʃviːdɐstɔʁf]; Low German: Swiersdörp) is a village in the municipality Neu Wulmstorf in the district Harburg in the north of Lower Saxony, Germany. It is part of the Hamburg Metropolitan Region.

== Geography ==
Schwiederstorf — although a separate 'Ort' — forms almost a joint village with Elstorf to the west. Daerstorf lies in the north, the Harburg Hills in the east and Bachheide and Eversen-Heide further to the south.

== History ==
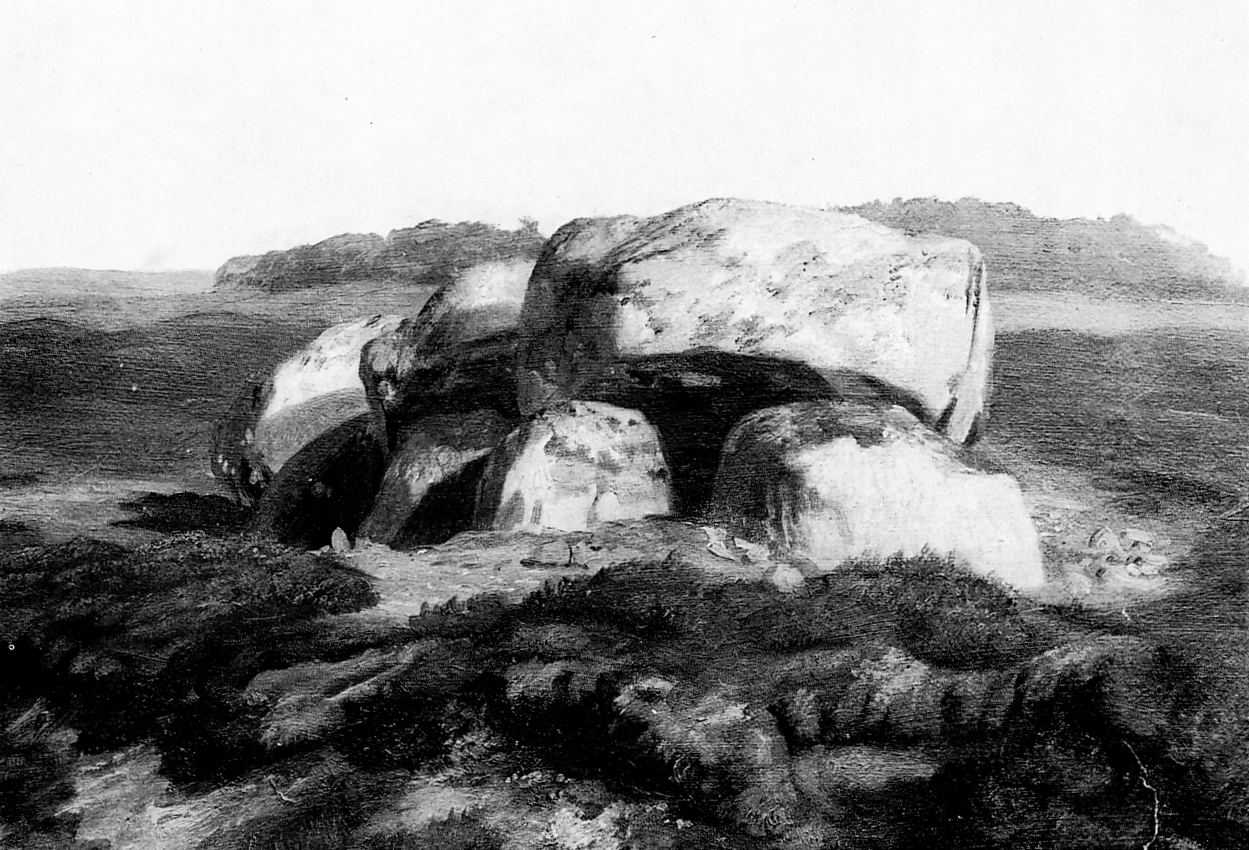
Painting of the Elstorf Tumulus by Jakob Gensler, 1839

Signs of the Neolithic Funnelbeaker culture like the nearby tumuli of Elstorf and Daerstorf show early settlements from the Bronze Age in this area.

The first official record of Schwiederstorf dates back to 1355.

During the First French Empire it belonged to the département Bouches-de-l'Elbe.

Just shortly before the end of World War II Elstorf and Schwiederstorf were captured on April 20, 1945 by the A-Companie of the 1st Rifle Brigade and the 8th King’s Royal Irish Hussars of the English troops.

Schwiederstorf was incorporated into the municipality of Neu Wulmstorf on July 1, 1972.

== Culture ==
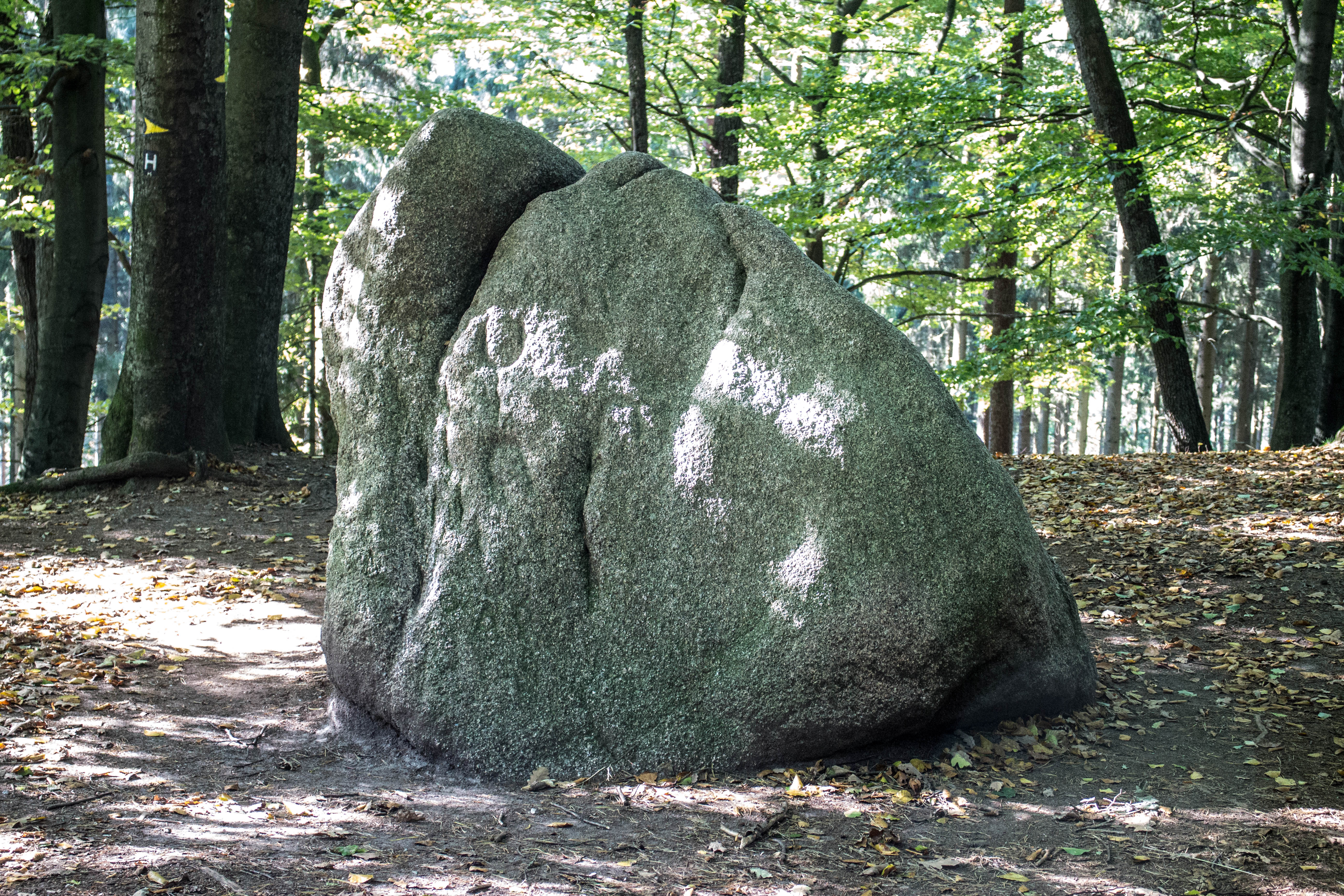
Karlstein

Schwiederstorf's coat of arms shows the glacial erratic Karlstein and the Imperial Crown of the Holy Roman Empire to reference a myth of Charlemagne's interrupted nap during the Saxon Wars. By this legend, Charlemagne took rest at the Karlstein and threatened to kill anyone who dared to wake him up. So his dog was thrown at him to wake him up as the Saxons closed in. As he noticed the danger, he yelled ″So sure as I will split this stone with my sword, so certain we will defeat the Saxons″ swung onto his horse, jumped over the Karlstein and cut it with his sword. His horse and dog also left their marks in the stone. The Saxons where defeated and the 'Ortstein' near Grauen is said to have its reddish color from the bloodstained soil.

The E1 European long distance path passes by the Karlstein.

Each year Faslam is celebrated for three days in February since the 17th century, but it originates from the farmhand's celebrations. It ends on a Sunday with the traditional Eierschnorren.
