= Harburg Rathaus station =

Railway station in Hamburg, Germany

Harburg Rathaus
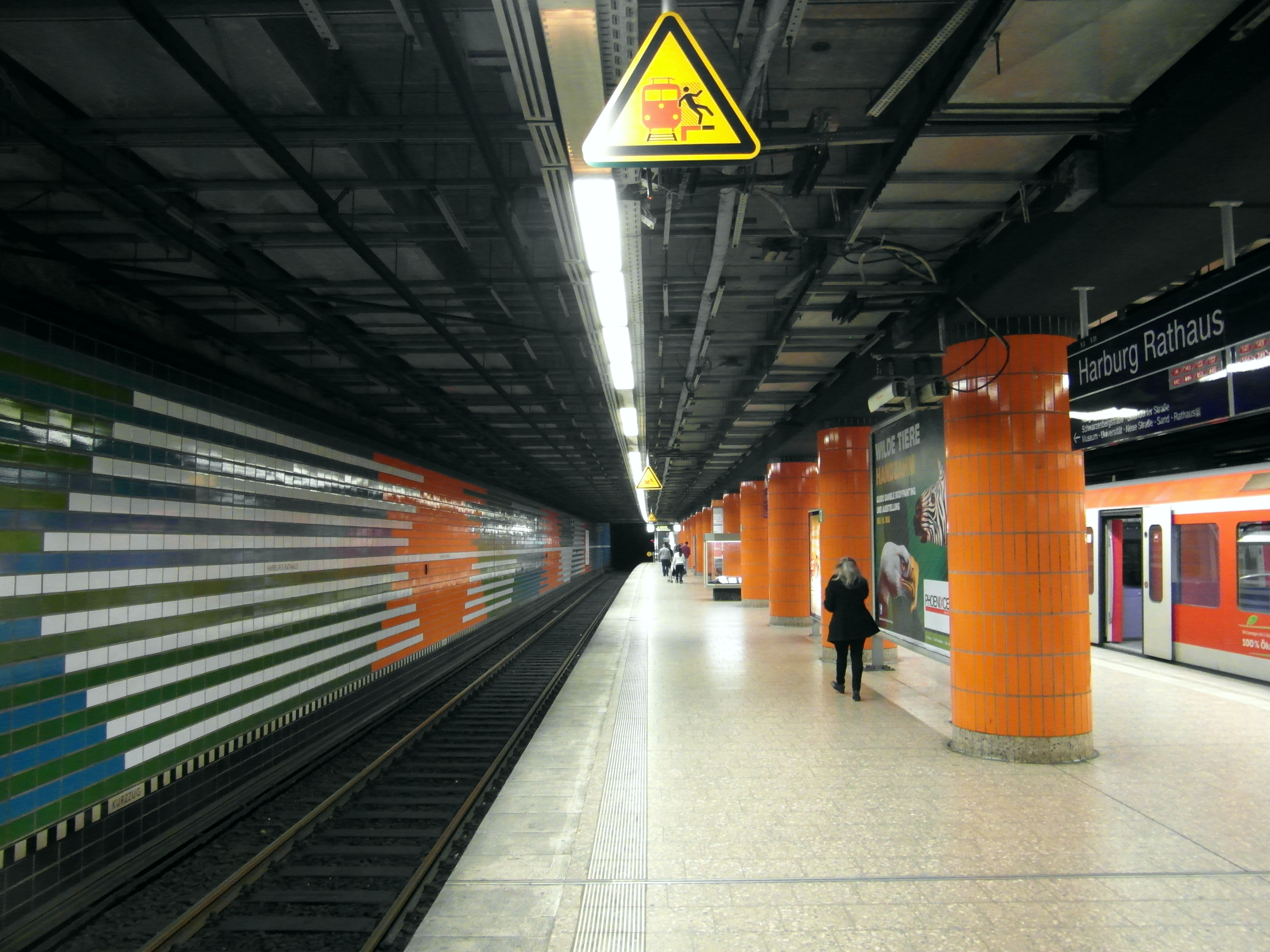

General information
- Location: Harburger Ring 20; 21079, Hamburg-Harburg, Hamburg; Germany
- Coordinates: 53°27′38″N 9°58′52″E
- Operator: S-Bahn Hamburg GmbH
- Lines: Harburg S-Bahn
- Platforms: 2 island platforms
- Tracks: 4
- Connections: Bus, Taxi

Construction
- Structure type: Underground
- Accessible: Yes

Other information
- Station code: 2556
- DS100 code: AHRF
- IBNR: 8004267
- Category: 3
- Fare zone: HVV: B/308
- Website: www.bahnhof.de

History
- Opened: 23 September 1983; 42 years ago
- Electrified: at opening

Services
Preceding station	Hamburg S-Bahn	Following station
Hamburg-Harburg towards Pinneberg	S3	Heimfeld towards Hamburg-Neugraben
Hamburg-Harburg towards Elbgaustraße	S5	Heimfeld towards Stade
Location
- Location within Hamburg Location within Schleswig-Holstein Location within Germany Location within Europe

Hamburg-Harburg Rathaus station is a station of the Hamburg S-Bahn on the Harburg S-Bahn in the suburb Harburg in the German city of Hamburg and is capable of serving as a bunker.

== Function as an S-Bahn station ==
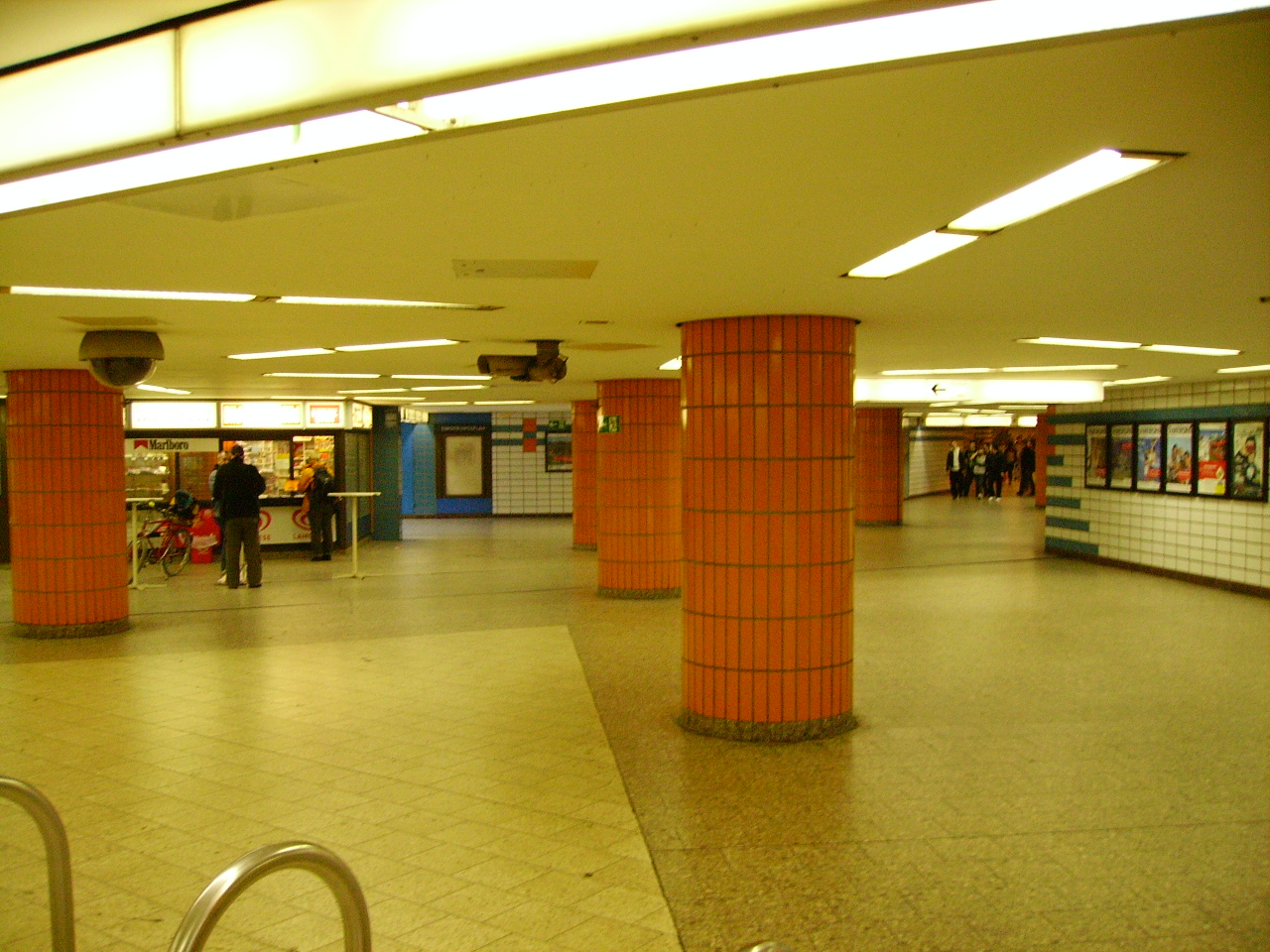
Harburg Rathaus intermediate level

Opened on 23 September 1983, the underground station is located under the Harburger Ring and is about 200 m long. It has three platform tracks and a reversing track for turning trains. Also located within the underground station facilities is the Hrf (Harburg-Rathaus) interlocking. The station is used by S3 and S5 services.

During the construction period two structures were built that could be extended as connections to a future branch line towards the southwest. One of them is located east of the station in the tunnel, the other is at the tunnel mouth towards Heimfeld.

After the lifts were replaced in 2006, the station was restored again in 2008 to increase protection from fire. As in many other underground S-Bahn stations in Hamburg, ceiling panels were removed to give more space for smoke to rise into in case of fire. As at other stations, the passage height in stairways was reduced to two metres around the fire exits to keep out smoke and to prevent smoke reaching the stairs and other parts of the station.

== Function as a civil defence structure ==
The platform area of the S-Bahn station is also the city's largest fallout shelter. In an emergency, 5,000 people can survive there for two weeks. In adjacent rooms located on several floors there are rooms for serving the shelter, including extensive sanitation facilities and a large kitchen. In addition to the three platforms there is also an area for parking three long trains, which can be used for accommodating the civilian population. In total, 2,300 m^{2} are available. Since the end of the Cold War the bunker can only be made operational with a lead time of six months.

== S-Bahn services ==
The following services operate through the station.

Line	Route
S3	Pinneberg – Thesdorf – Halstenbek – Krupunder – Elbgaustraße – Eidelstedt – Stellingen – Langenfelde – Diebsteich – Altona – Königstraße – Reeperbahn – Landungsbrücken – Stadthausbrücke – Jungfernstieg – Hauptbahnhof – Hammerbrook (City Süd) – Veddel (BallinStadt) – Wilhelmsburg – Harburg – Harburg Rathaus – Heimfeld – Neuwiedenthal – Neugraben
S5	Elbgaustraße – Eidelstedt – Stellingen – Langenfelde – Diebsteich – Holstenstraße – Sternschanze – Dammtor – Hauptbahnhof – Hammerbrook (City Süd) – Veddel (BallinStadt) – Wilhelmsburg – Harburg – Harburg Rathaus – Heimfeld – Neuwiedenthal – Neugraben – Fischbek – Neu Wulmstorf – Buxtehude – Neukloster – Horneburg – Dollern – Agathenburg – Stade

== See also ==
- List of Hamburg S-Bahn stations
