= Bundesautobahn 253 =

Federal motorway in Germany

A 253
- Bundesautobahn 253

Route information
- Length: 4 km (2.5 mi)
- History: Downgraded to B 75 in 2019

Location
- Country: Germany
- States: Hamburg

Highway system
- Roads in Germany; Autobahns; List; Federal; List; State; E-roads

Bundesautobahn 253 (translates from German as Federal Motorway 253, short form Autobahn 253, abbreviated as BAB 253 or A 253) is a short motorway in Hamburg, in north Germany. It connects the A 252 with the B 75. Following the rerouting of Wilhelm Reichsstraße, the A 253 was downgraded to B 75 on 6 October 2019.

== Exit list ==
Intersection		3-way interchange Hamburg-Wilhelmsburg-Nord (planned) A 252
		Hamburg-Wilhelmsburg-West (planned)
		Hamburg-Wilhelmsburg-Süd (planned)
		Kreuz Hamburg-Wilhelmsburg-Süd (planned) A 26
		Europabrücke
	(4)	Hamburg-Neuland
	(5)	Hamburg-Harburg-Mitte B 73
	(6)	Hamburg-Wilstorf B 4
B 75 continue as B 75
