= Rübke =

- Ortsteil of Neu Wulmstorf
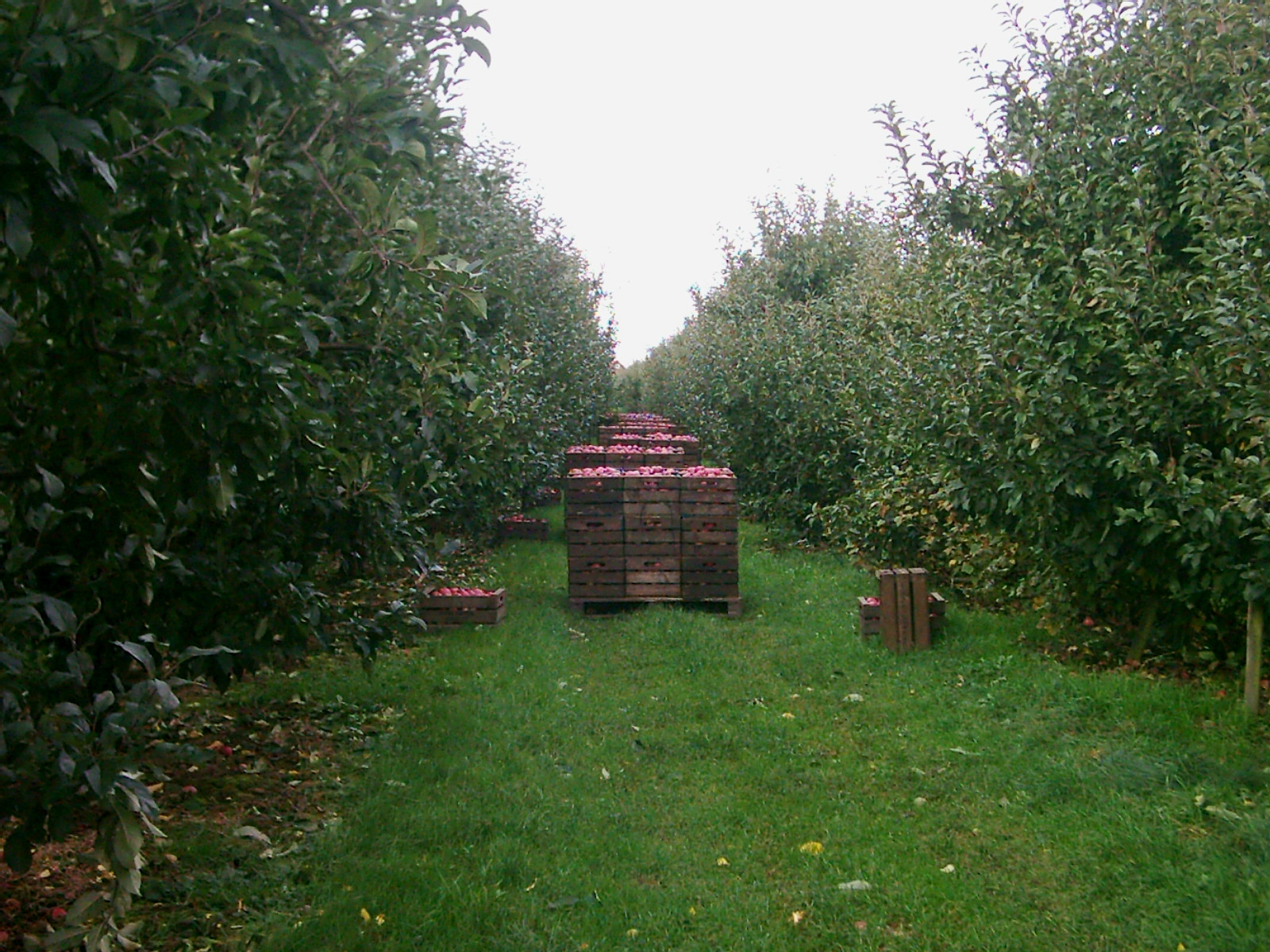
- Harvest of apples in Rübke

- Coat of arms
- Interactive map of Rübke
- Location within Germany Location within Lower Saxony
- Coordinates: 53°29′30″N 09°46′35″E
- Country: Germany
- State: Lower Saxony
- District: Harburg
- Municipality: Neu Wulmstorf
- Elevation: −1 m (−3.3 ft)

Population (2016)
  - Total: 583
- Time zone: UTC+01:00 (CET)
  - Summer (DST): UTC+02:00 (CEST)
- Postal codes: 21629
- Dialling codes: 040
- Vehicle registration: WL

Rübke (German pronunciation: [ˈʁʏpkə]; Low German: Rübk) is a village located in the north of Lower Saxony, Germany. Its population is 583 (2016). It consists of two main roads (Nincoper Deich and Buxtehuder Straße).

Rübke belonged — as to its government — to the Prince-Archbishopric of Bremen, established in 1180. In religious respect, however, Rübke formed part of the Roman Catholic Diocese of Verden until after 1566 its incumbent bishops lost papal recognition, except of a last Catholic bishop from 1630 to 1631, respectively. In 1648 the Prince-Archbishopric was transformed into the Duchy of Bremen, which was first ruled in personal union by the Swedish Crown — interrupted by a Danish occupation (1712–1715) - and from 1715 on by the Hanoverian Crown. The Kingdom of Hanover incorporated the Duchy in a real union and the Ducal territory became part of the new Stade Region, established in 1823.

The town has limited facilities, with only a bank and a car yard being the main commercial entities in the town. Along Buxtehude Straße there is the town's fire brigade, which provides a location for the majority of the town's social gatherings.

To the south west of the town lies Buxtehude and to the south, Neu Wulmstorf. The closest major city is Hamburg, to the north.

The town is not serviced by standard public transport; however, bus stops exist for the local school buses which service the area.

The B3n is connecting Neu Wulmstorf and the B73 with Rübke and the ramp for the planned A26.
