= Heimfeld station =

Railway station in Hamburg, Germany

Heimfeld
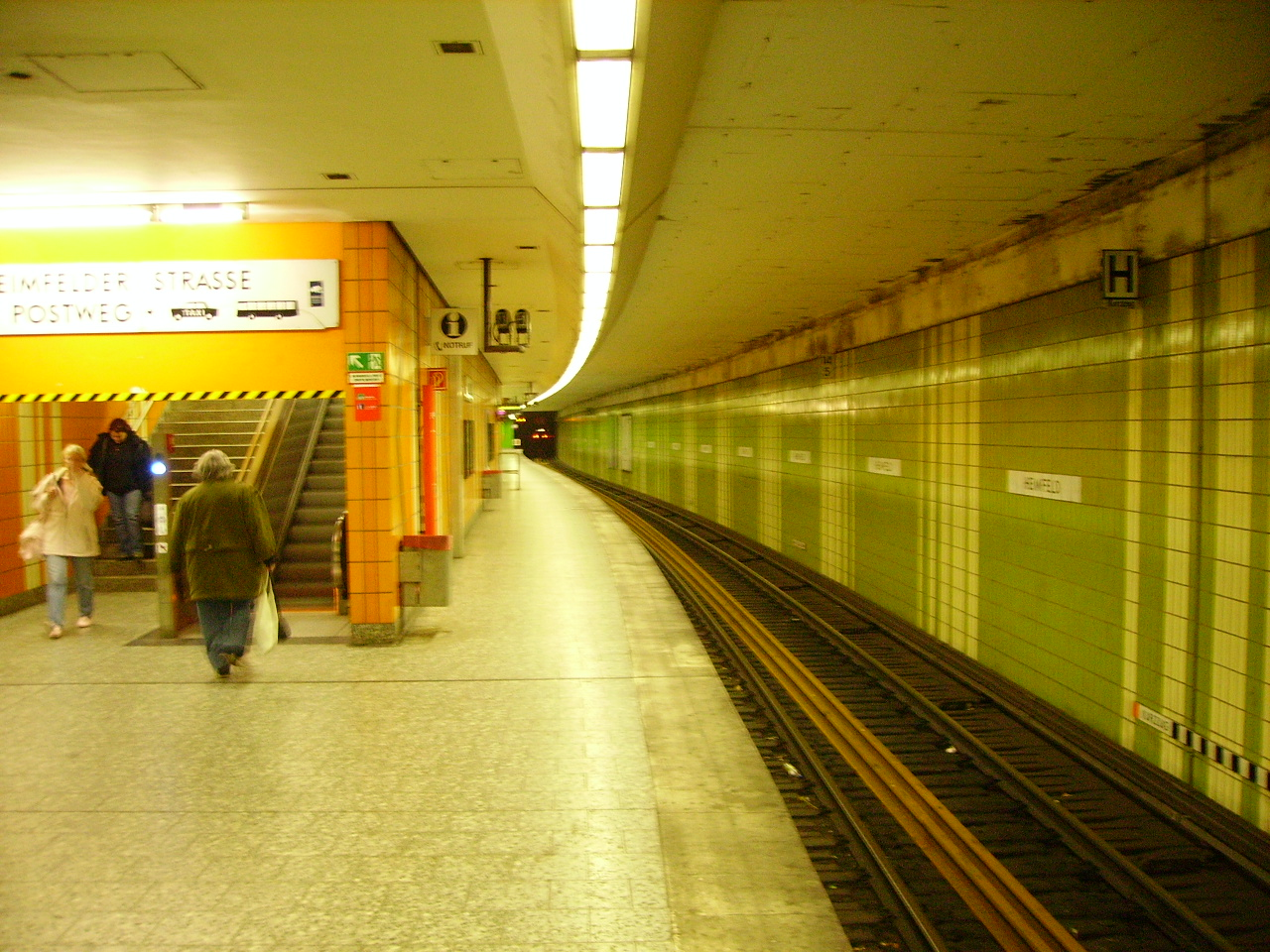

General information
- Location: Heimfelder Straße 2; 21075 Hamburg; Germany
- Coordinates: 53°27′56″N 09°57′46″E
- Operator: S-Bahn Hamburg GmbH
- Line: S3 S5
- Platforms: 1 island platform
- Tracks: 2
- Connections: Bus, Taxi

Construction
- Structure type: Underground
- Accessible: Yes

Other information
- Station code: ds100: AHFS; DB: 2662
- Fare zone: HVV: B/308

History
- Opened: 4 August 1984; 42 years ago
- Electrified: at opening

Services
| Preceding station | Hamburg S-Bahn | Following station |
|---|---|---|
| Harburg Rathaus towards Pinneberg | S3 | Neuwiedenthal towards Hamburg-Neugraben |
| Harburg Rathaus towards Elbgaustraße | S5 | Neuwiedenthal towards Stade |
Location
- Location within Hamburg Location within Schleswig-Holstein Location within Germany Location within Europe

Heimfeld is a station on the Harburg S-Bahn line in Hamburg, Germany, and served by the trains of Hamburg S-Bahn lines S3 and S5. The station was opened in 1984 and is located in the Hamburg district of Heimfeld. Heimfeld is part of the Hamburg borough of Harburg.

== History ==
The station was opened with the S3's extension to Neugraben in 1984. Renovations started in 2012. Tiles removed in 2018. Walls painted black in 2019. Ceiling cover for electrical wires removed in 2015. Escalator removed in 2022. New LCD platform displays installed in late 2022. Still waiting for new ceiling and walls in 2022.

== Service ==
The lines S3 and S5 of Hamburg S-Bahn call at Heimfeld station.

== Gallery ==
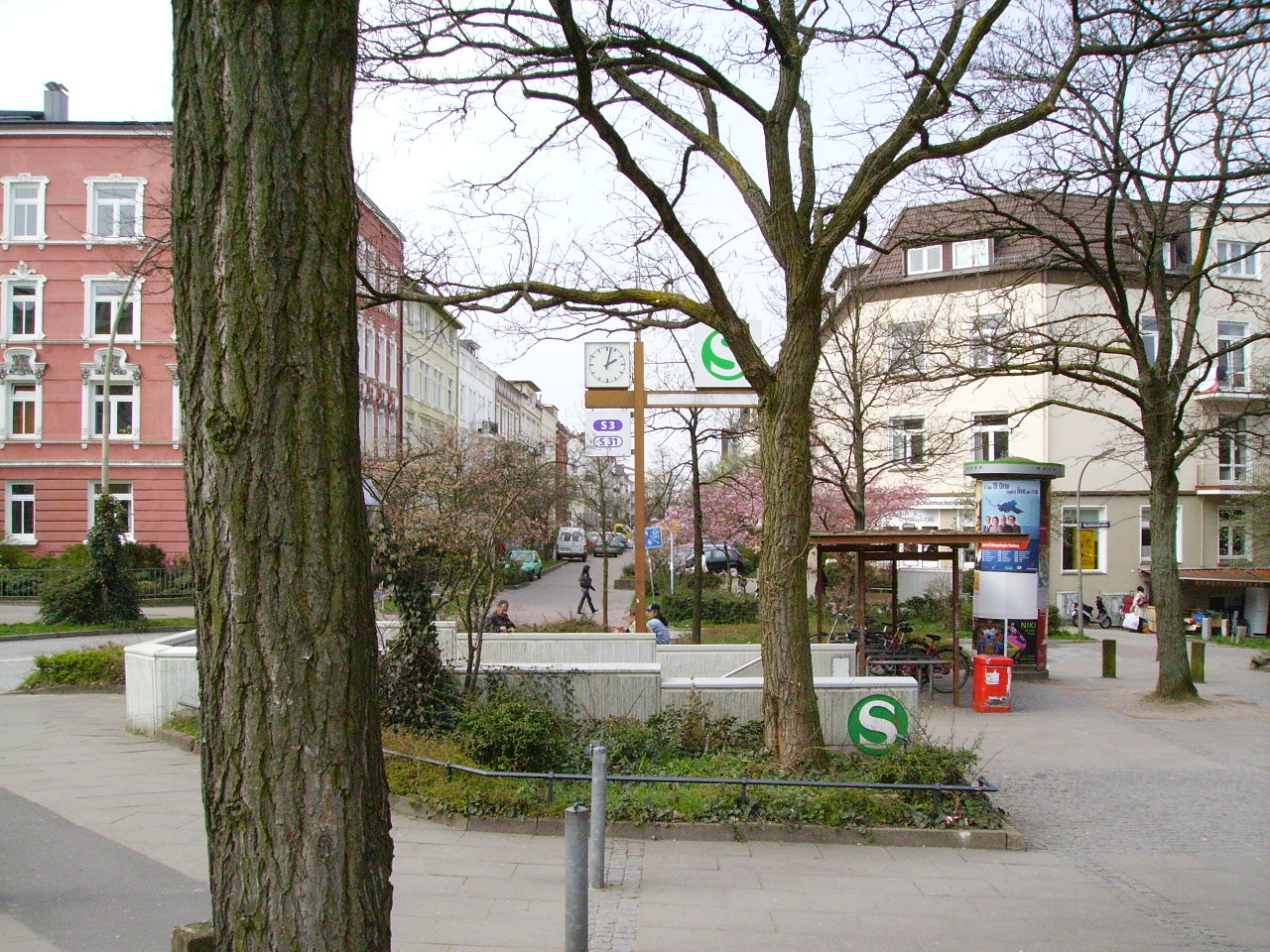
One of the station's entrances on surface

== See also ==
- Hamburger Verkehrsverbund (HVV)
- List of Hamburg S-Bahn stations
