= Ardestorf =

- Ortsteil of Neu Wulmstorf
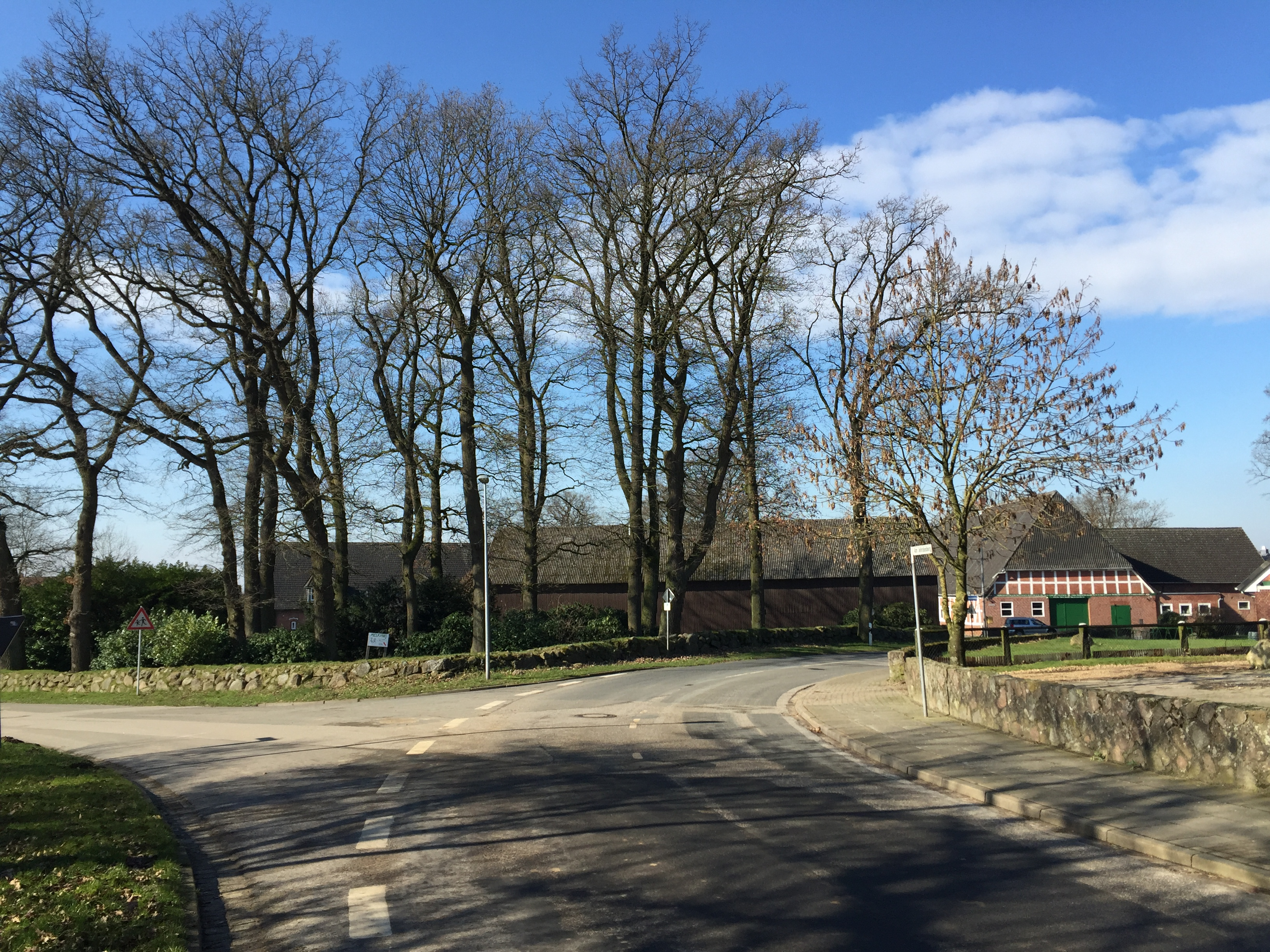
- Interactive map of Ardestorf
- Location within Germany Location within Lower Saxony
- Coordinates: 53°25′30″N 9°47′16″E
- Country: Germany
- State: Lower Saxony
- District: Harburg
- Municipality: Neu Wulmstorf
- Elevation: 36–50 m (118–164 ft)
- Time zone: UTC+01:00 (CET)
  - Summer (DST): UTC+02:00 (CEST)
- Postal codes: 21629
- Dialling codes: 04168

Ardestorf (German pronunciation: [ˈaʁdəstɔʁf]; Low German: Arsdörp) is a village in the municipality Neu Wulmstorf in the district Harburg in the north east of Lower Saxony, Germany. It is part of the Hamburg Metropolitan Region.
