= Rade, Neu Wulmstorf =

Rade
- Ortsteil of Neu Wulmstorf
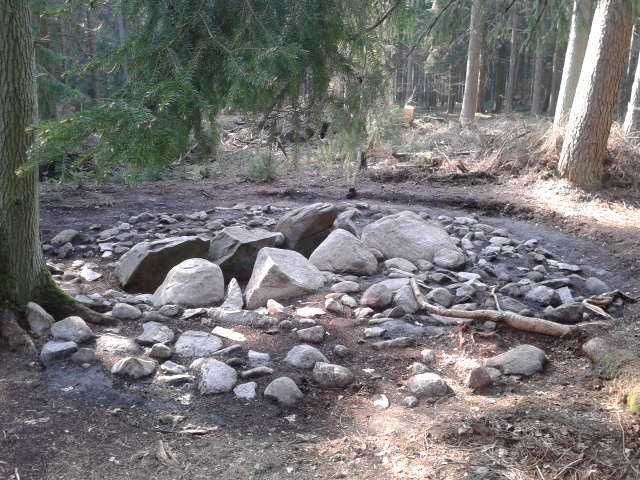

- Coat of arms
- Interactive map of Rade
- Location within Germany Location within Lower Saxony
- Coordinates: 53°23′14″N 9°47′36″E
- Country: Germany
- State: Lower Saxony
- District: Harburg
- Municipality: Neu Wulmstorf

Population (2016)
  - Total: 763
- Time zone: UTC+01:00 (CET)
  - Summer (DST): UTC+02:00 (CEST)
- Postal codes: 21629
- Dialling codes: 04168

Rade (German pronunciation: [ˈʁaːdə]; Low German: Raa) is a village in the municipality Neu Wulmstorf in the district Harburg in the north east of Lower Saxony, Germany. It is part of the Hamburg Metropolitan Region.
