= Ohlenbüttel =

- Ortsteil of Neu Wulmstorf
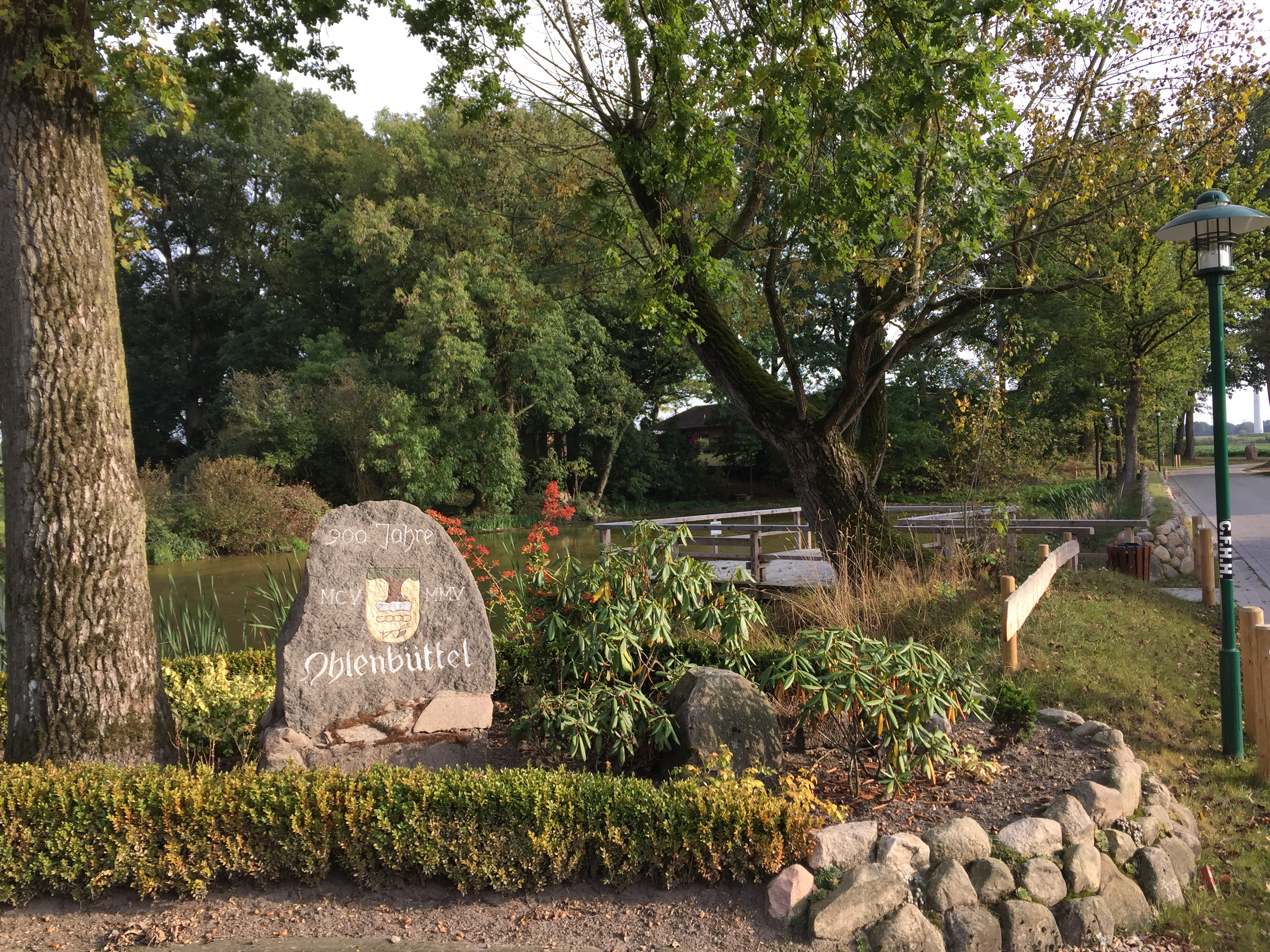

- Coat of arms
- Interactive map of Ohlenbüttel
- Location within Germany Location within Lower Saxony
- Coordinates: 53°23′46″N 9°46′40″E
- Country: Germany
- State: Lower Saxony
- District: Harburg
- Municipality: Neu Wulmstorf
- Time zone: UTC+01:00 (CET)
  - Summer (DST): UTC+02:00 (CEST)
- Postal codes: 21629
- Dialling codes: 04168

Ohlenbüttel (German pronunciation: [ˈoːlənˌbʏtl̩]; Low German: Ömbüddel) is a village in the municipality of Neu Wulmstorf in the district of Harburg in the north east of Lower Saxony, Germany. It is part of the Hamburg Metropolitan Region.
