= Neu Wulmstorf =

- Municipality
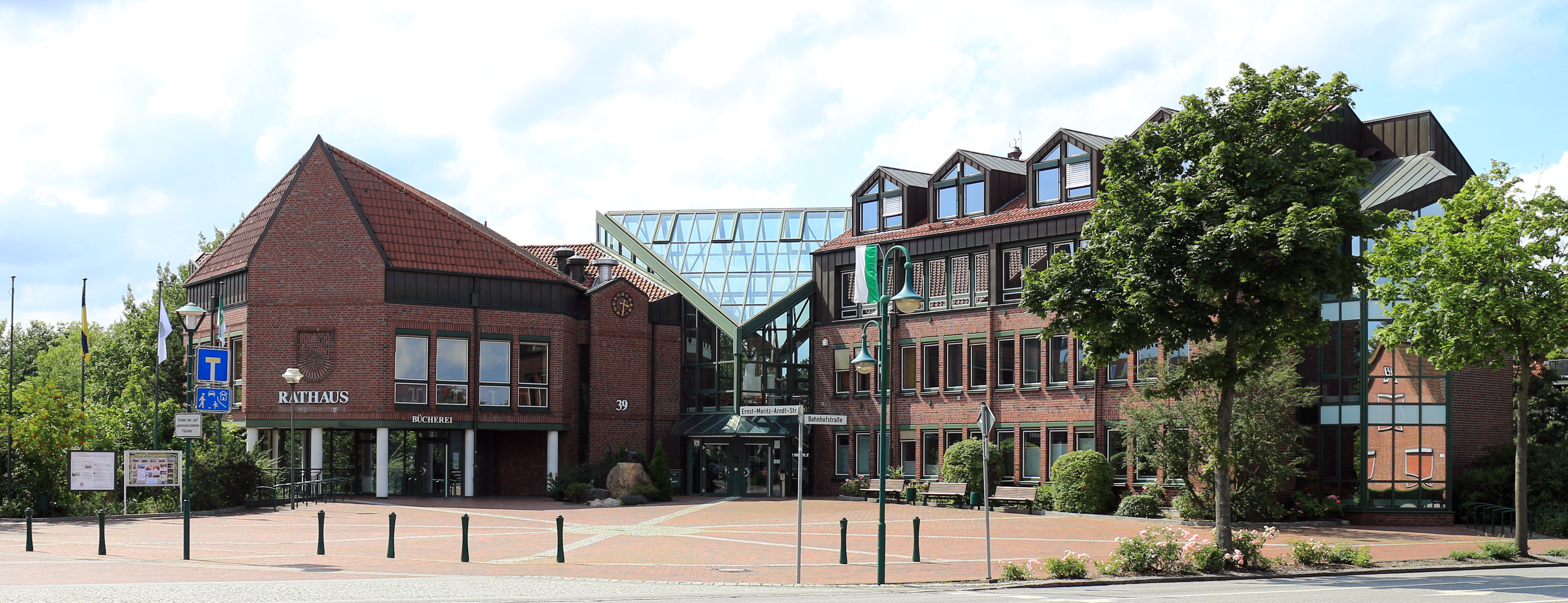
- City hall Neu Wulmstorf

- Flag Coat of arms

- Location of Neu Wulmstorf within Harburg district
- Interactive map of Neu Wulmstorf
- Location within Germany Location within Lower Saxony
- Coordinates: 53°27′46″N 9°47′44″E
- Country: Germany
- State: Lower Saxony
- District: Harburg

Government
  - Mayor (2021–26): Tobias Handtke (SPD)

Area
  - Total: 56.34 km^{2} (21.75 sq mi)
- Elevation: 7 m (23 ft)

Population (2025-12-31)
  - Total: 23,552
  - Density: 418.0/km^{2} (1,083/sq mi)
- Time zone: UTC+01:00 (CET)
  - Summer (DST): UTC+02:00 (CEST)
- Postal codes: 21629
- Dialling codes: 040 and 04168
- Vehicle registration: WL
- Website: www.neu-wulmstorf.de

Neu Wulmstorf (German pronunciation: [ˈnɔʏ ˈvʊlmstɔʁf]; Low German: Vosshusen) is a municipality ('Einheitsgemeinde') in the district of Harburg, in Lower Saxony, Germany. It changed its name on December 11, 1964 from ″Wulmstorf″ to ″Neu Wulmstorf″ (lit. 'New Wulmstorf'). It is part of the Hamburg Metropolitan Region.

The municipality of Neu Wulmstorf consists of:

- New Wulmstorf, consisting of
  - New Wulmstorf
  - Wulmstorf
  - Daerstorf
- Elstorf, consisting of
  - Elstorf
  - Ardestorf
  - Elstorf-Bachheide
- Rade consisting of
  - Rade
  - Mienenbüttel
  - Ohlenbüttel
- Rübke
- Schwiederstorf.

== Geography ==
Neu Wulmstorf is situated between Hamburg in the east, the marsh of the Altes Land in the north, the forest of the Harburg Hills (Harburger Berge) in the south east, Buchholz in der Nordheide and the geest to the south, and Buxtehude to the west. The municipality incorporates eleven villages and most of the area marks the north north west outskirts of the larger natural region of the Lüneburg Heath in North Germany.

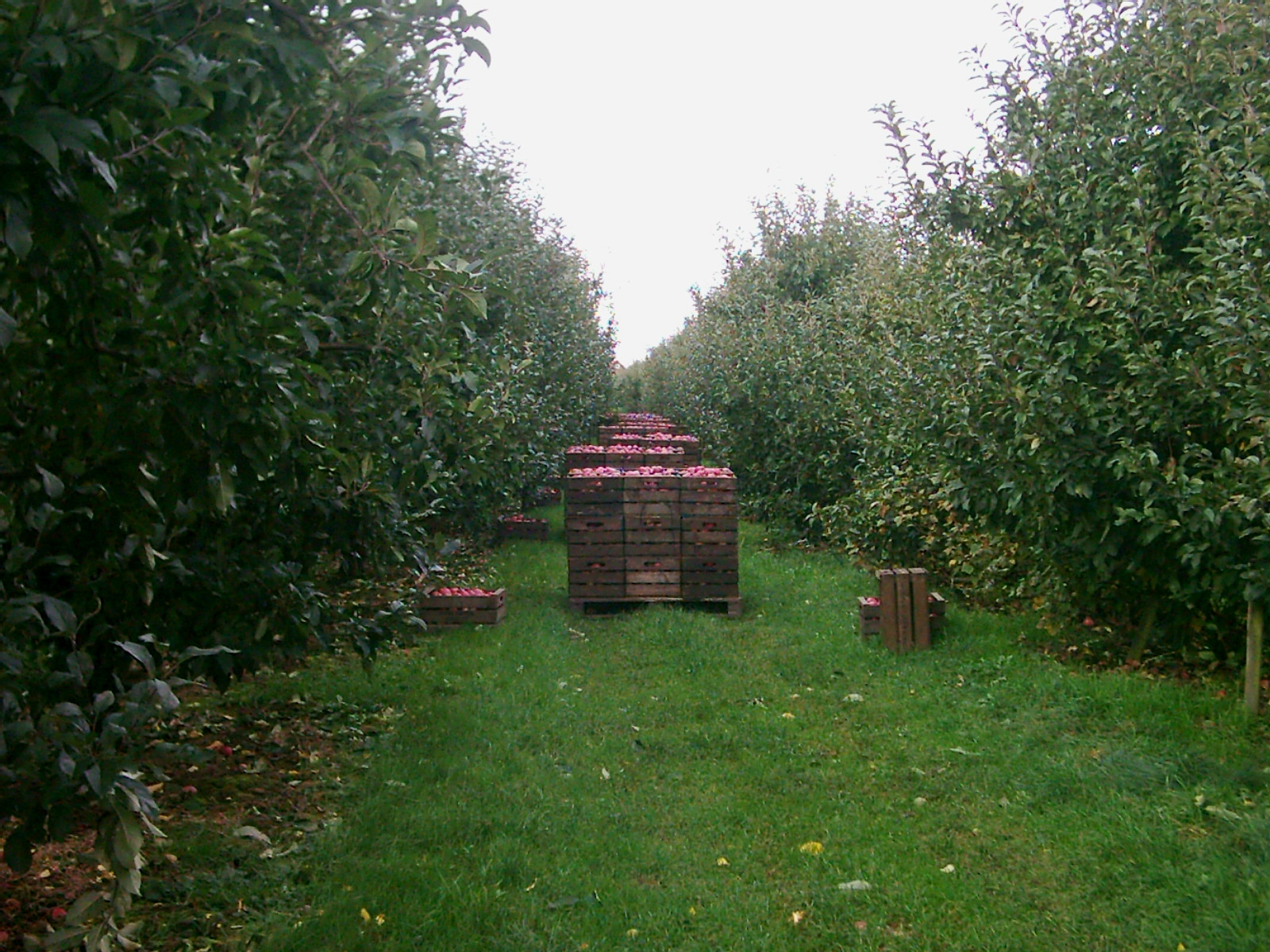
Harvesting of apples in Rübke

The landscape is dominated by the transition from the marsh in the north to the geest in south east. On the marsh side lies the village of Rübke in the Lower Saxon Elbe marshes at sea level and the nature reserve (Naturschutzgebiet) Moore bei Buxtehude (mire), which is home to the corn crake.

The village of Neu Wulmstorf sits right on the transitions from the mire up to the geest.

Further up, the villages Wulmstorf, Daerstorf, Schwiederstorf, Rade are marking the highest elevations of Neu Wulmstorf on the western outskirts of the Harburg Hills.

The villages of Ardestorf, Elstorf, Bachheide, Rade, Mienenbüttel and Ohlenbüttel lie on a stretch reaching from the north east to the south end of the municipality.

== Population ==
On December 31, 2013 there were 20,384 registered people living in Neu Wulmstorf. The population roughly doubled during the past 42 years. See below for the development of the population (all on December 31):

		1961	1970	1987	1992	1997	2002	2007	2012	2013	2014
Total	Population	6.754	10.011	14.227	16.751	18.841	20.543	20.649	20.979	20.384	22.274
Total	June 1987 = 100 %			101,5 %	119,5 %	134,4 %	146,6 %	147,3 %	149,7 %		

== Infrastructure ==
The relatively young village of Neu Wulmstorf grew at the intersection of two old trails. The main road connecting Rübke in the marsh with the geest villages of Wulmstorf and Elstorf intersects with the Bundesstraße 73 as the main road connecting Stade and Cuxhaven with Hamburg. It dominates the settlement as it cuts through from east to west. Just before the geest, the Lower Elbe Railway marked the north border of the Neu Wulmstorf village for many years, with the Neu Wulmstorf S-Bahn station. The station bore the name Daerstorf before that village including the exclave on which the station was built upon, got incorporated into Neu Wulmstorf.

Another axis is the connection from Buxtehude to Buchholz. The first stretch of the Bundesstraße 3, intersects with the Bundesautobahn 1 at the south tip of the municipality.

=== Transportation ===
Neu Wulmstorf is serviced by the rapid transit system of the city train of Hamburg with the station Neu Wulmstorf. Bus service connects Neu Wulmstorf to Hamburg-Neugraben.

=== Education ===
Neu Wulmstorf has three primary schools. Secondary schools are the Hauptschule Vossbarg, the Realschule Vierkaten and the Gymnasium Neu Wulmstorf.

=== Sports ===
Neu Wulmstorf has several sporting areas including a sports centre with swimming hall in the centre of the village. These clubs provide a rich sports life:

- TVV Neu Wulmstorf
- TSV Elstorf
- BSC Neu Wulmstorf
- Schützenverein Neu Wulmstorf
- DLRG

== Twin town ==
- Nyergesújfalu, Hungary
