= Fischbek station =

Railway station in Neugraben-Fischbek, Germany

Fischbek
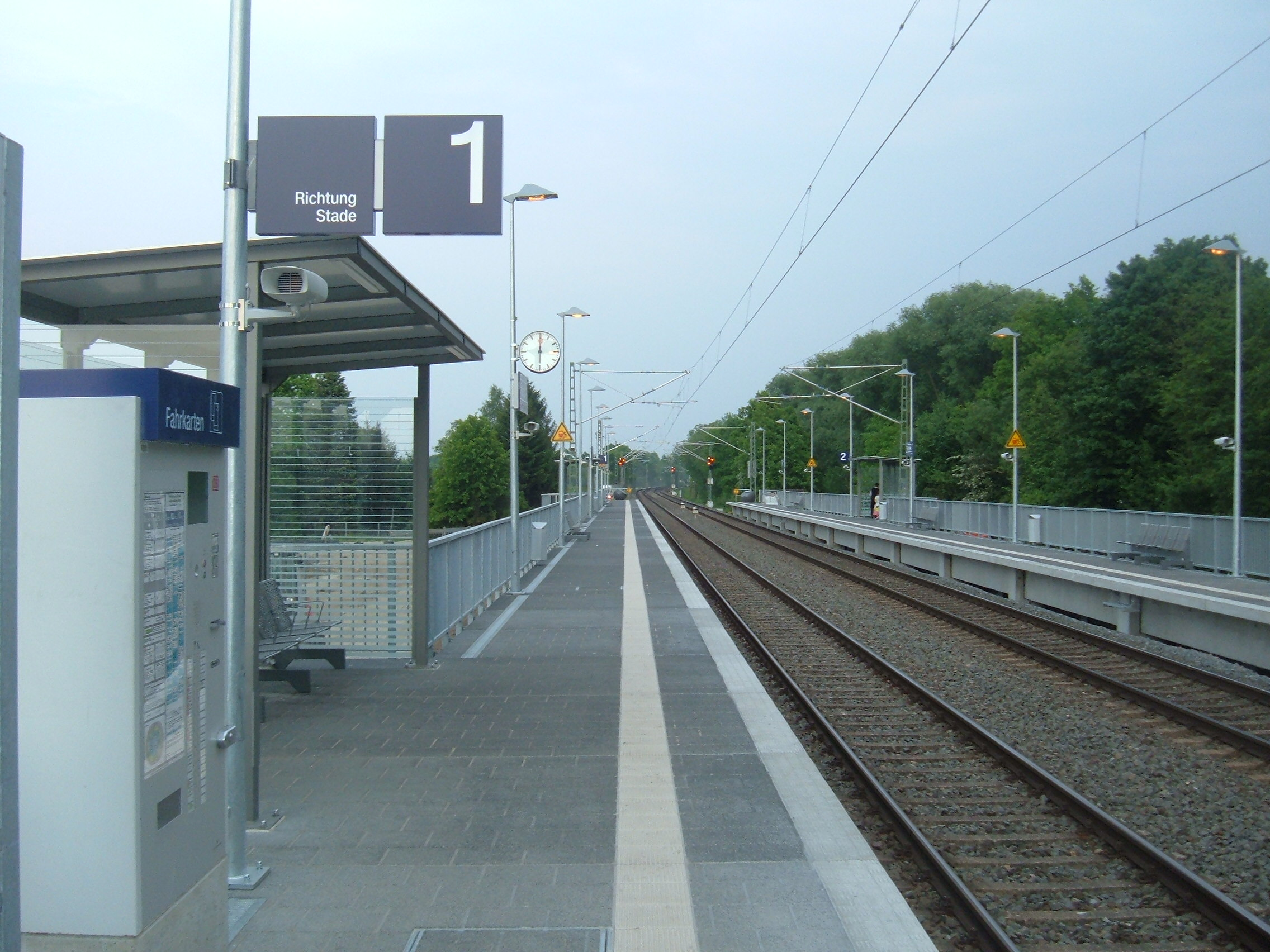

General information
- Location: Ohrnsweg 24; 21149 Hamburg; Germany
- Coordinates: 53°28′29″N 09°49′10″E
- Operator: S-Bahn Hamburg GmbH
- Line: S5
- Platforms: 2 side platforms
- Tracks: 2
- Connections: Bus

Construction
- Structure type: Elevated
- Accessible: Yes

Other information
- Station code: DB: 8112; Category: 5
- Fare zone: HVV: B/318 and 418

History
- Opened: 9 December 2007; 18 years ago
- Electrified: at opening

Services
| Preceding station | Hamburg S-Bahn | Following station |
|---|---|---|
| Hamburg-Neugraben towards Elbgaustraße | S5 | Neu Wulmstorf towards Stade |
Location
- Location within Hamburg Location within Schleswig-Holstein Location within Germany Location within Europe

Fischbek is a rapid transit railway station (German: Bahnhof or Haltestelle Fischbek) located in the Neugraben-Fischbek quarter of Hamburg. The trains of the Hamburg S-Bahn serve the station on the line S5 from Elbgaustraße station via central station to Stade.

== Service ==
Rail service at Fischbek station:

== See also ==
- Hamburger Verkehrsverbund (HVV)
- List of Hamburg S-Bahn stations
