= Drochtersen =

- Municipality
- Flag Coat of arms

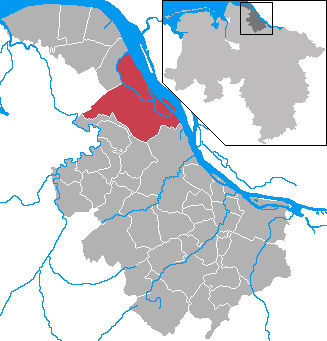
- Location of Drochtersen within Stade district
- Interactive map of Drochtersen
- Location within Germany Location within Lower Saxony
- Coordinates: 53°42′N 09°23′E
- Country: Germany
- State: Lower Saxony
- District: Stade
- Subdivisions: 2 districts

Government
  - Mayor (2021–26): Mike Eckhoff (Ind.)

Area
  - Total: 126.79 km^{2} (48.95 sq mi)
- Elevation: 2 m (6.6 ft)

Population (2025-12-31)
  - Total: 11,199
  - Density: 88.327/km^{2} (228.77/sq mi)
- Time zone: UTC+01:00 (CET)
  - Summer (DST): UTC+02:00 (CEST)
- Postal codes: 21706
- Dialling codes: 04143, 04148, 04775
- Vehicle registration: STD
- Website: www.drochtersen.de

Drochtersen (German pronunciation: [ˈdʁɔxtɐzn̩]) is a municipality in the district of Stade, in Lower Saxony (Germany). It is located 45 km Northwest of Hamburg.

It belonged to the Prince-Archbishopric of Bremen. In 1648 the Prince-Archbishopric was transformed into the Duchy of Bremen, which was first ruled in personal union by the Swedish and from 1715 on by the Hanoverian Crown. In 1823 the Duchy was abolished and its territory became part of the Stade Region.

== Notable places ==
The Drochtersen Shot Tower is a 42 meter high shot tower owned by the Haentler & Natermann Jagd-Schrot & Hagel-Fabrik (Hunt pellet and hail fabrication) factory for the production of shot balls at the Elbe. This tower is no longer in use.
