= Daerstorf =

- Ortsteil of Neu Wulmstorf
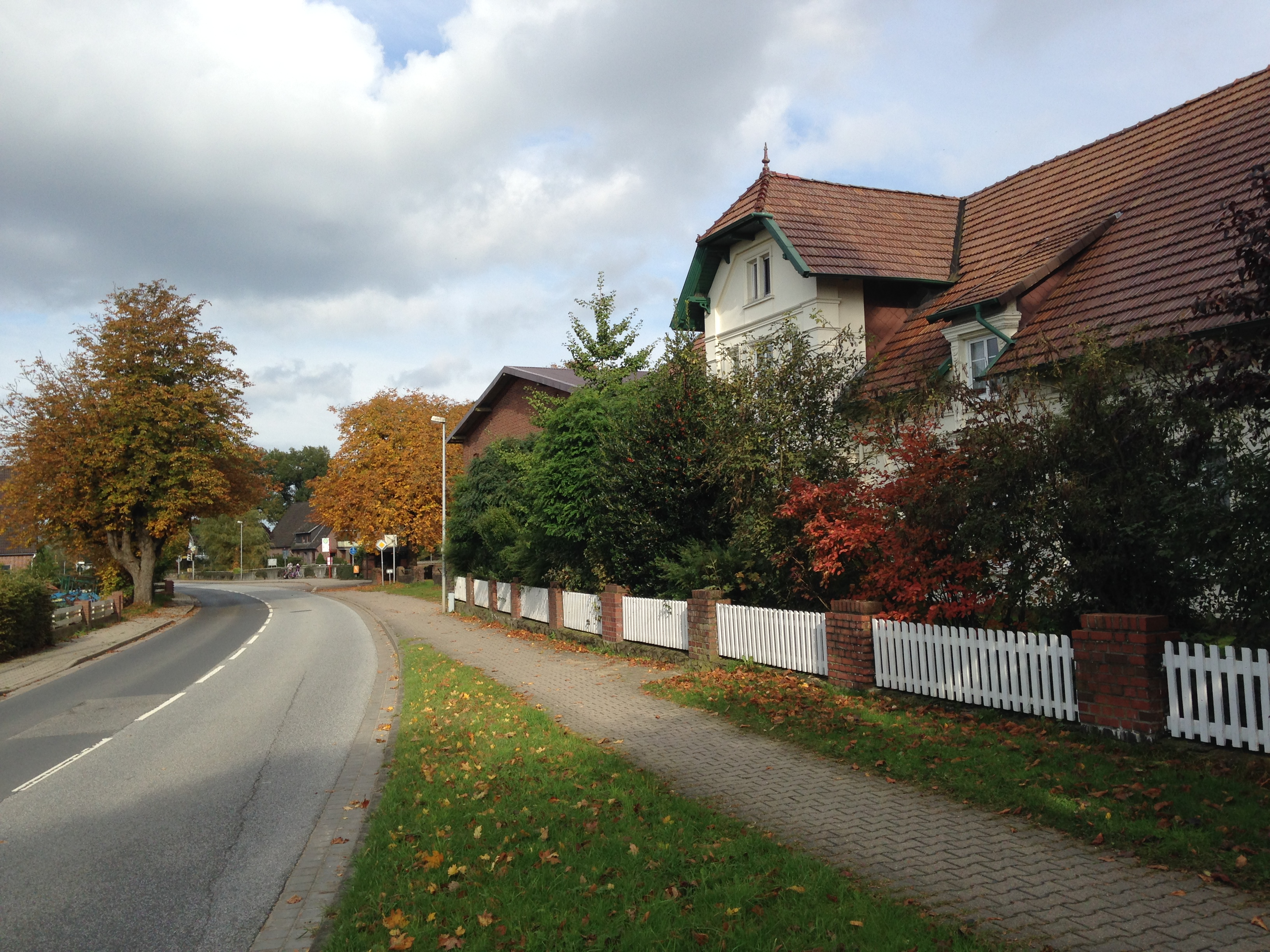

- Coat of arms
- Interactive map of Daerstorf
- Location within Germany Location within Lower Saxony
- Coordinates: 53°26′18″N 09°48′20″E
- Country: Germany
- State: Lower Saxony
- District: Harburg
- Municipality: Neu Wulmstorf
- Elevation: 59 m (194 ft)
- Time zone: UTC+01:00 (CET)
  - Summer (DST): UTC+02:00 (CEST)
- Postal codes: 21629
- Dialling codes: 040
- Vehicle registration: WL

Daerstorf (German pronunciation: [ˈdaːɐ̯stɔʁf]; Low German: Doasdörp) is a village in the municipality Neu Wulmstorf in the district Harburg in the north of Lower Saxony, Germany. It is part of the Hamburg Metropolitan Region.

== History ==
Tumuli show early settlements in Bronze Age and a small village around 770. 'Dardestorpe' was first documented 1295 at the abbey of Hildesheim. During the First French Empire Daerstorf had a population of 101 was part of the Bouches-de-l'Elbe. The neighboring village of Neu Wulmstorf was founded in 1835 by the Daerstorf farmhand Peter Lohmann, who was working in Wulmstorf at the time. Just shortly before the end of World War II Daerstorf was captured on April 20, 1945, by the A-Companie of the 1st Rifle Brigade and the 8th King's Royal Irish Hussars of the English troops after heavy fights.

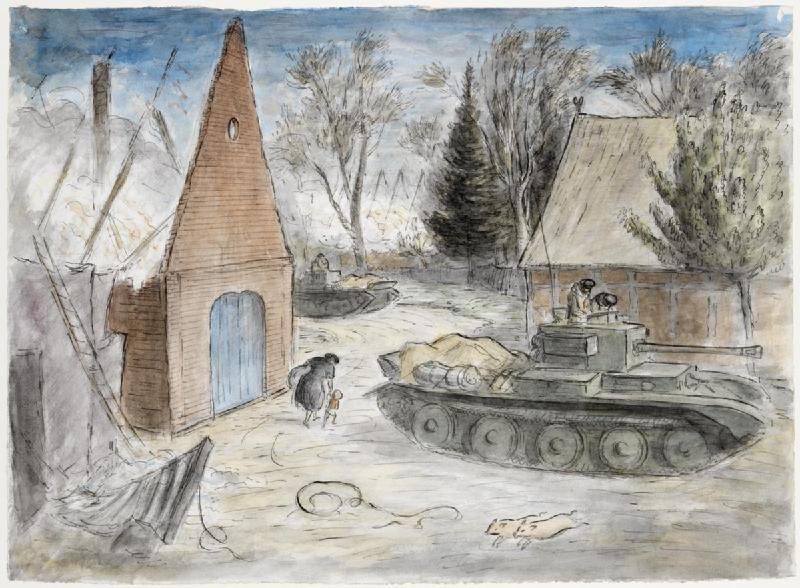
"With the 8th Hussars in Germany- Tanks in a burning village" Drawing by Edward Ardizzone during the capture of Daerstorf 1945.

The independent municipality Daerstorf became part of Neu Wulmstorf on 1 January 1970.
