= Neuwiedenthal station =

Railway stop in Hamburg, Germany

Neuwiedenthal
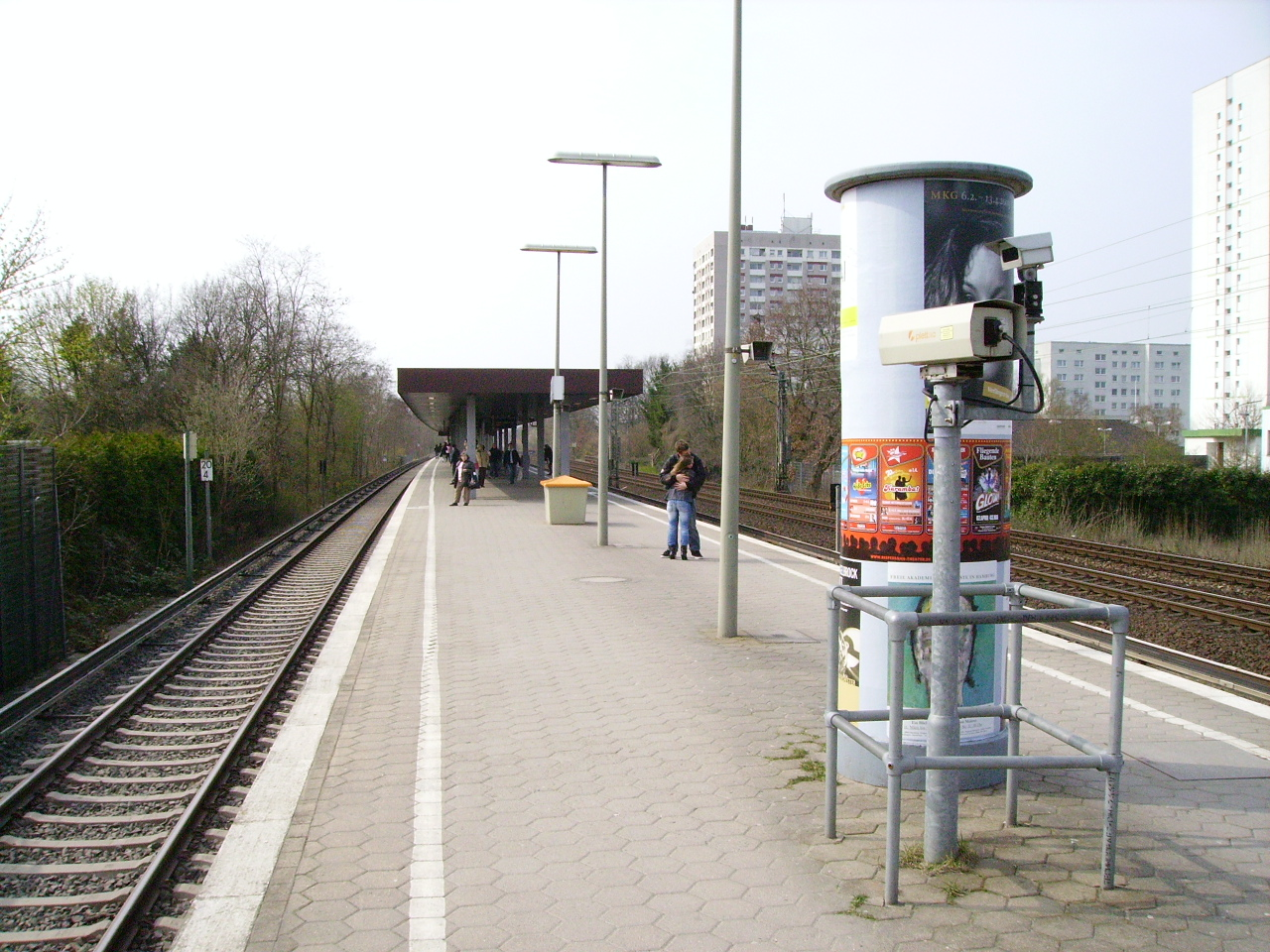

General information
- Location: Rehrstieg 1; 21147 Hamburg; Germany
- Coordinates: 53°28′23″N 09°52′38″E
- Operator: S-Bahn Hamburg GmbH
- Line: S3 S5
- Platforms: 1 island platform
- Tracks: 2
- Connections: Bus, Taxi

Construction
- Structure type: Elevated
- Parking: Park and Ride (167 slots)
- Accessible: Yes

Other information
- Station code: ds100: ANWS; DB: 4465
- Fare zone: HVV: B/318

History
- Opened: 4 August 1984; 42 years ago

Services
Preceding station	Hamburg S-Bahn	Following station
Heimfeld towards Pinneberg	S3	Hamburg-Neugraben Terminus
Heimfeld towards Elbgaustraße	S5	Hamburg-Neugraben towards Stade
Location
- Location within Hamburg Location within Schleswig-Holstein Location within Germany Location within Europe

Neuwiedenthal is a station on the Harburg S-Bahn line in Hamburg, Germany, and is served by the trains of Hamburg S-Bahn lines S3 and S5. The station was opened in 1984 and is located in the Hamburg quarter of Hausbruch. Hausbruch is part of the Hamburg borough of Harburg.

== History ==
The station was opened in 1984 with the S3's extension to Neugraben.

== Service ==
The lines S3 and S5 of the Hamburg S-Bahn call at Neuwiedenthal station.

== Gallery ==
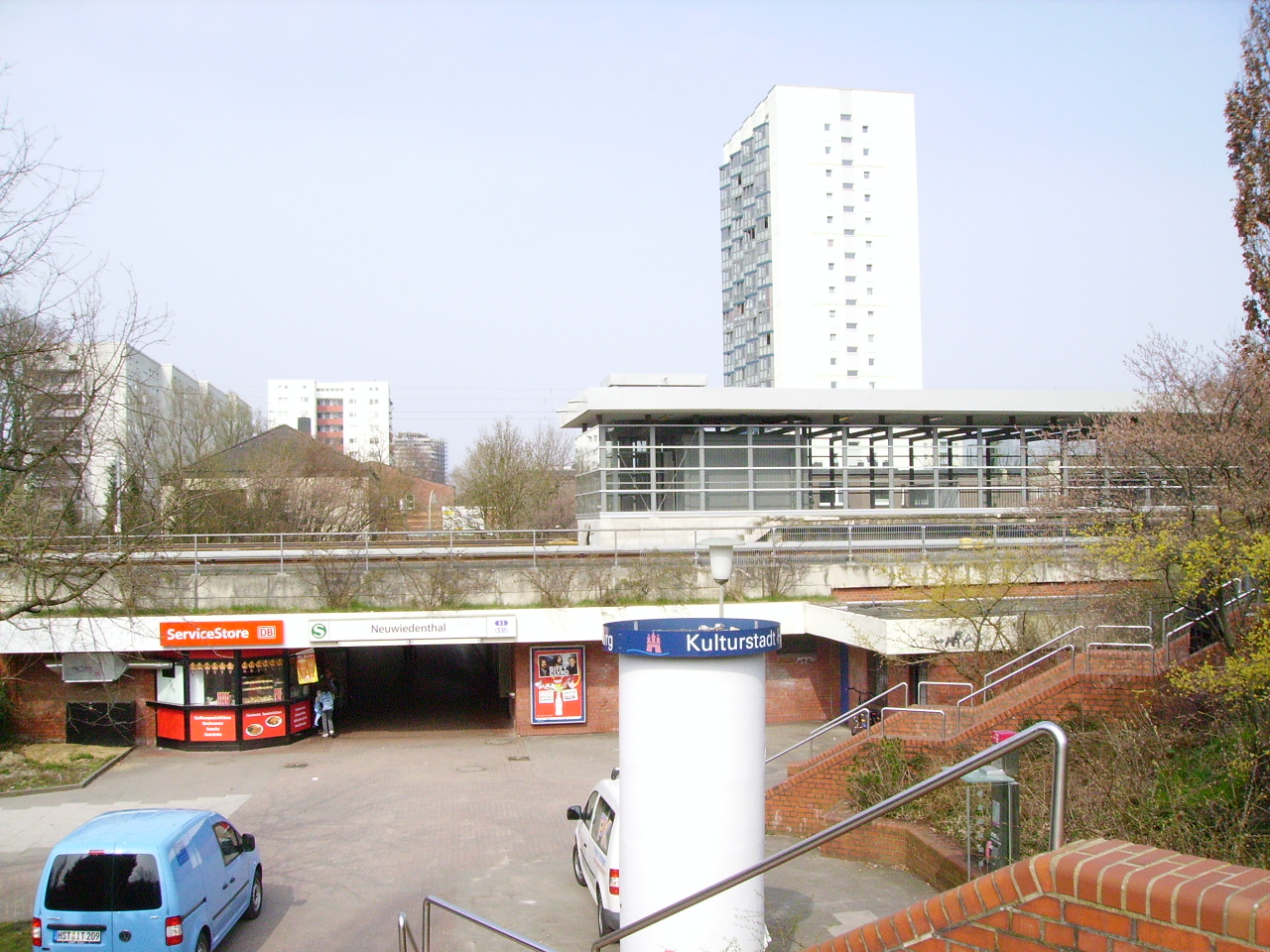
One of the station's entrances

== See also ==
- Hamburger Verkehrsverbund (HVV)
- List of Hamburg S-Bahn stations
