= Wulmstorf =

- Ortsteil of Neu Wulmstorf
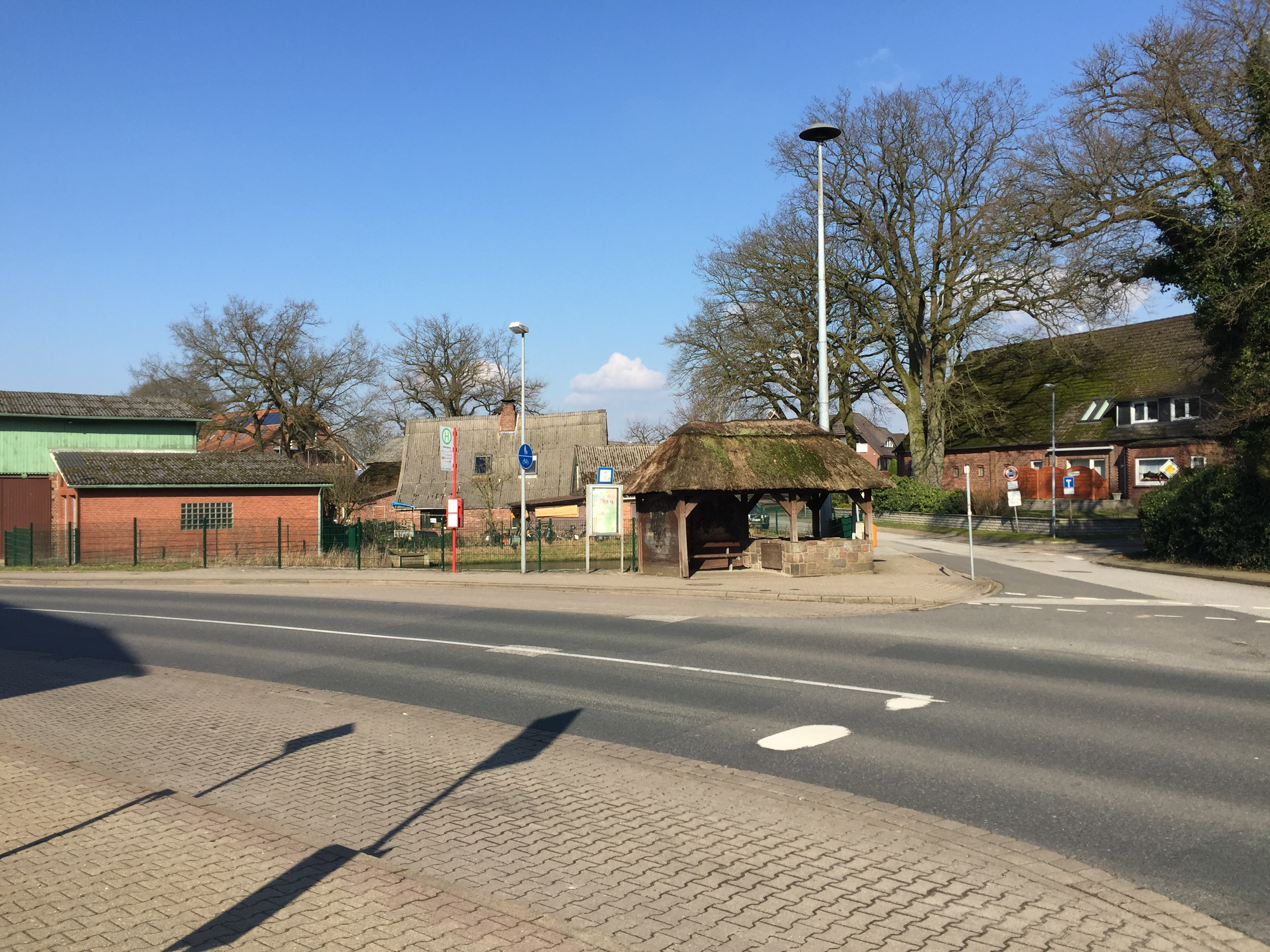
- Interactive map of Wulmstorf
- Location within Germany Location within Lower Saxony
- Coordinates: 53°26′35″N 9°48′20″E
- Country: Germany
- State: Lower Saxony
- District: Harburg
- Municipality: Neu Wulmstorf
- Elevation: 48–57 m (157–187 ft)
- Time zone: UTC+01:00 (CET)
  - Summer (DST): UTC+02:00 (CEST)
- Postal codes: 21629
- Dialling codes: 040

Wulmstorf (German pronunciation: [ˈvʊlmstɔʁf]; Low German: Wulmsdörp) is a village in the municipality Neu Wulmstorf in the district Harburg in the north east of Lower Saxony, Germany. It is part of the Hamburg Metropolitan Region.
