= Elstorf =

- Ortsteil of Neu Wulmstorf
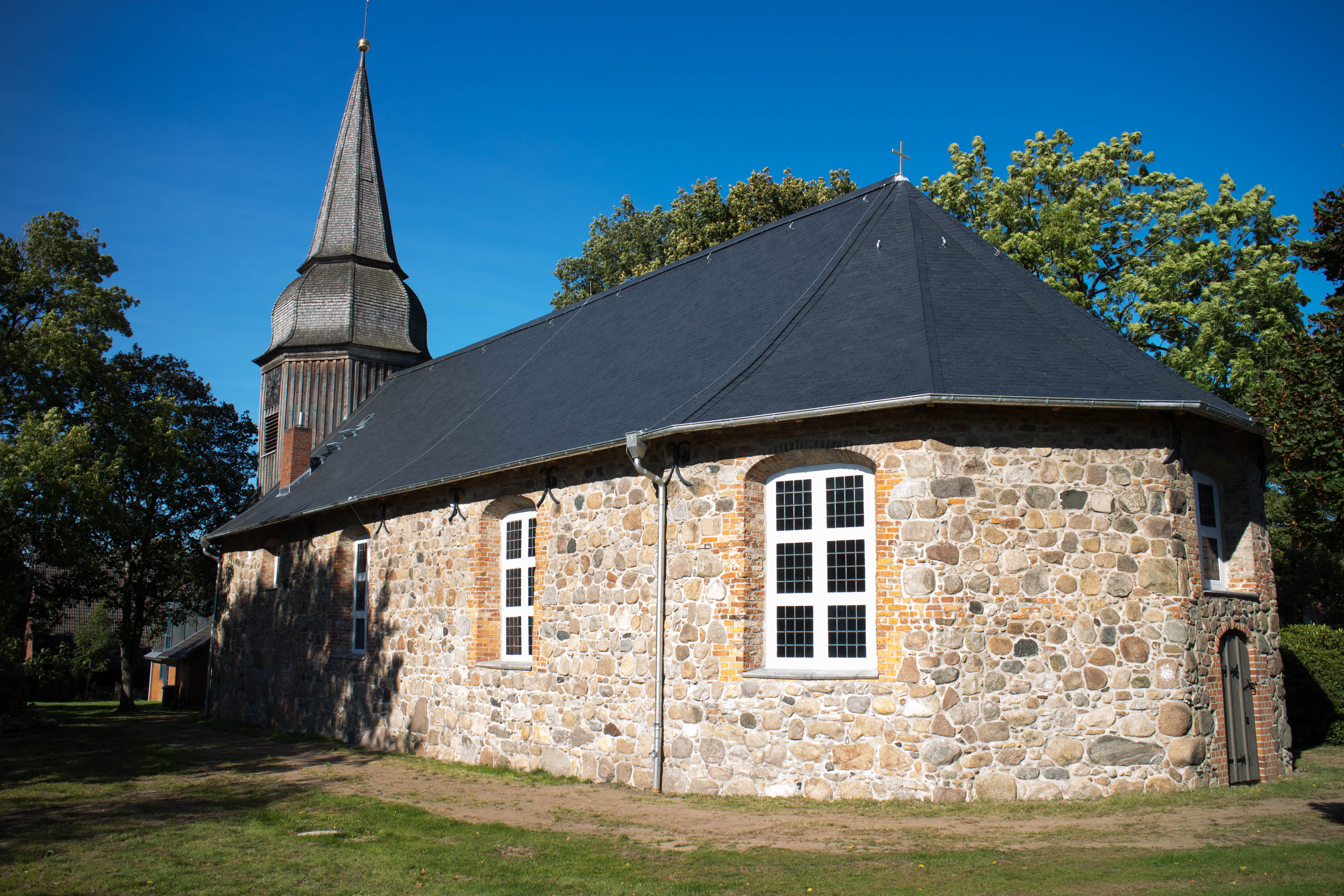

- Coat of arms
- Interactive map of Elstorf
- Location within Germany Location within Lower Saxony
- Coordinates: 53°25′30″N 9°47′16″E
- Country: Germany
- State: Lower Saxony
- District: Harburg
- Municipality: Neu Wulmstorf
- Elevation: 46–53 m (151–174 ft)

Population (2016)
  - Total: 3,072
- Time zone: UTC+01:00 (CET)
  - Summer (DST): UTC+02:00 (CEST)
- Postal codes: 21629
- Dialling codes: 04168

Elstorf (German pronunciation: [ˈɛlstɔʁf]; Low German: Ilsdörp) is a village in the municipality Neu Wulmstorf in the district Harburg in the north east of Lower Saxony, Germany. It is part of the Hamburg Metropolitan Region.
