= Neu Wulmstorf station =

Railway station in northwestern Germany

Neu Wulmstorf
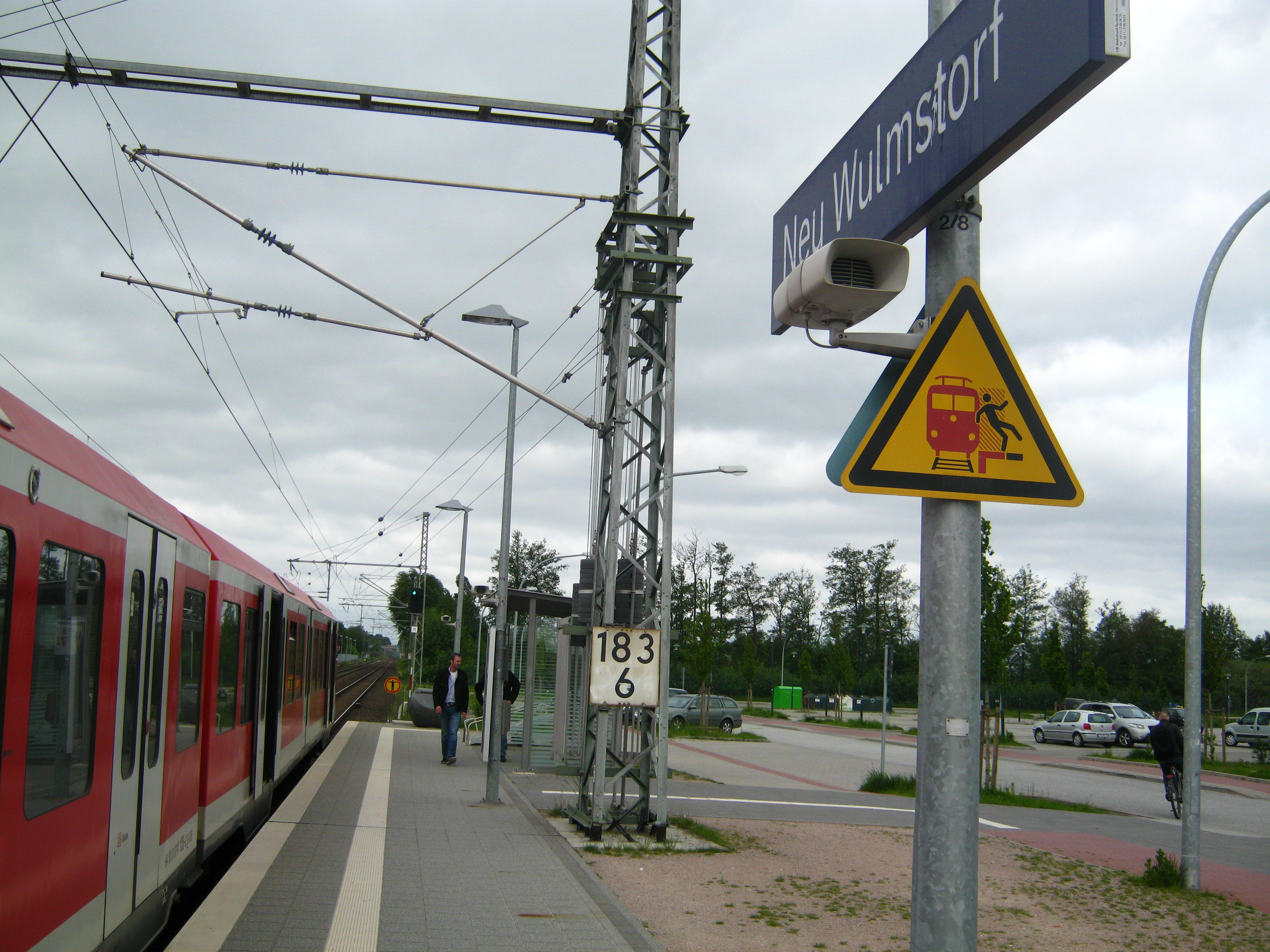

General information
- Location: Bahnhofstraße 88; 21649 Neu Wulmstorf; Germany
- Coordinates: 53°28′23″N 9°47′21″E
- Owner: DB Netz
- Operator: DB Station&Service
- Line: Lower Elbe Railway
- Platforms: 2 side platforms
- Tracks: 2
- Train operators: S-Bahn Hamburg

Construction
- Structure type: At grade
- Parking: Park and ride (280 slots)
- Accessible: Yes

Other information
- Station code: DB: 4359; Category: 5
- Fare zone: HVV: B/418

History
- Opened: 1 April 1881; 145 years ago
- Electrified: 29 September 1968; 57 years ago
- Former names: Daerstorf (1881–1970)

Services
Preceding station	Hamburg S-Bahn	Following station
Fischbek towards Elbgaustraße	S5	Buxtehude towards Stade
Location
- Location within Hamburg Location within Schleswig-Holstein Location within Germany Location within Europe

Neu Wulmstorf is a railway station in northwestern Germany. The station is situated in the municipality of Neu Wulmstorf on the Cuxhaven to Hamburg Niederelbebahn railway line. The station was built on an enclave of land belonging to Daerstorf and thus was called Daerstorf until Daerstorf joined the municipality of Neu Wulmstorf in 1970.

== Station layout ==
Neu Wulmstorf is an at-grade station with two side platforms and 2 tracks. Connection to buses and parking is available.

== Services ==
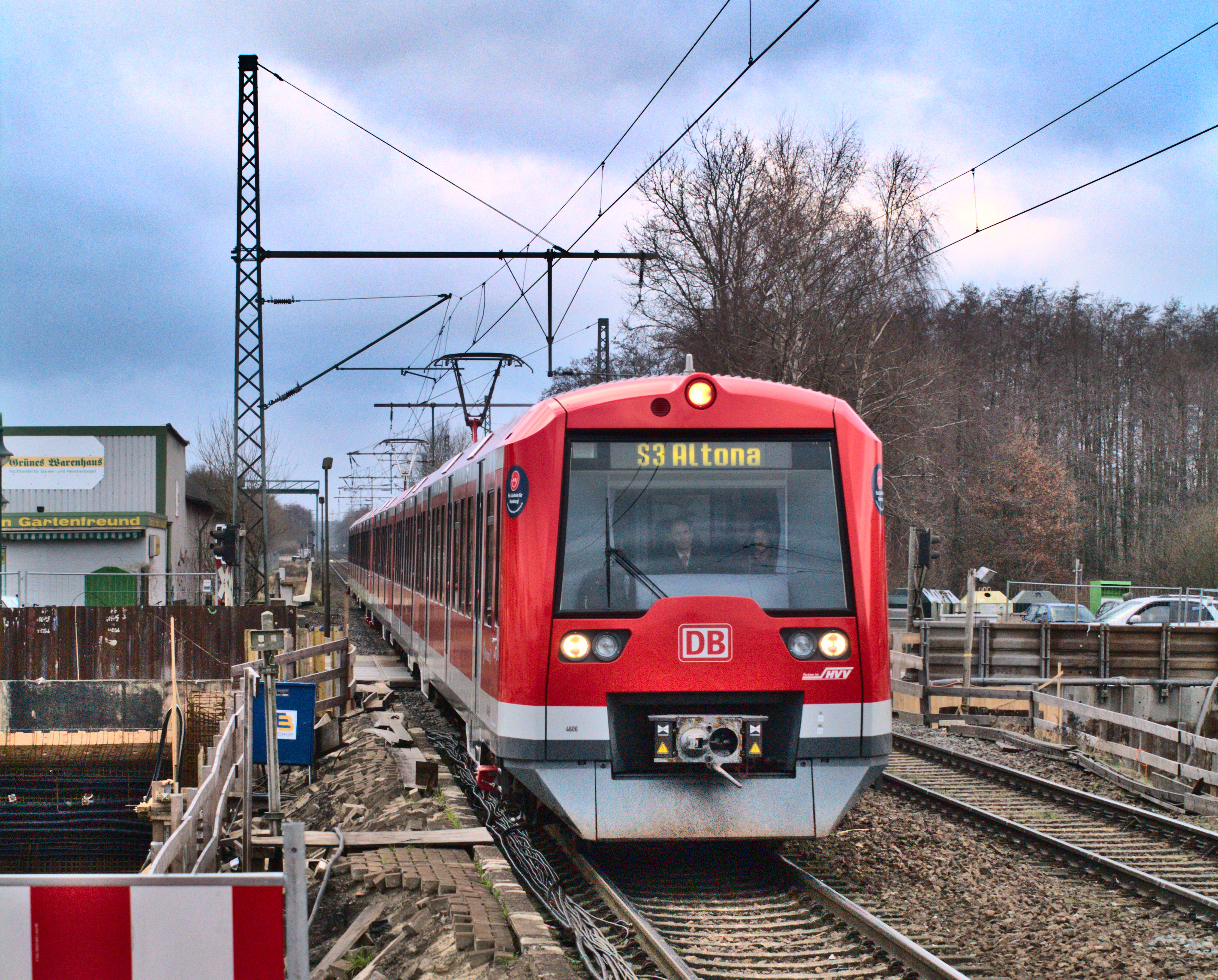
A 474 at Neu Wulmstorf station

Trains of the Hamburg S-Bahn serve the station since 2007.

Before 2007 regular commuter trains from Stade and regional trains from Cuxhaven to Hamburg called at the station. This included the Bremerhaven to Hamburg-Neugraben service, which was operated by EVB, and metronom service.

== See also ==
- Hamburger Verkehrsverbund (HVV)
- List of Hamburg S-Bahn stations
