= Wilhelmsburg =

Wilhelmsburg may refer to the following places:

- Wilhelmsburg, Hamburg, a former town, now quarter of Hamburg, Germany
- Wilhelmsburg, Mecklenburg-Vorpommern, a municipality in Mecklenburg-Vorpommern, Germany
- Wilhelmsburg, Austria, a town in Lower Austria, Austria
