= Moorburg =

Quarter in Hamburg, Germany

- Quarter of Hamburg
- Location of Moorburg within Hamburg
- Interactive map of Moorburg
- Location within Germany Location within Hamburg
- Coordinates: 53°29′23″N 9°56′30″E
- Country: Germany
- State: Hamburg
- City: Hamburg
- Borough: Harburg

Population (2024-12-31)
  - Total: 727
- Time zone: UTC+01:00 (CET)
  - Summer (DST): UTC+02:00 (CEST)

Moorburg (German pronunciation: [ˈmoːɐ̯bʊʁk]) is a place in Hamburg, Germany in the quarter Harburg. Flora and fauna: Altes Land.

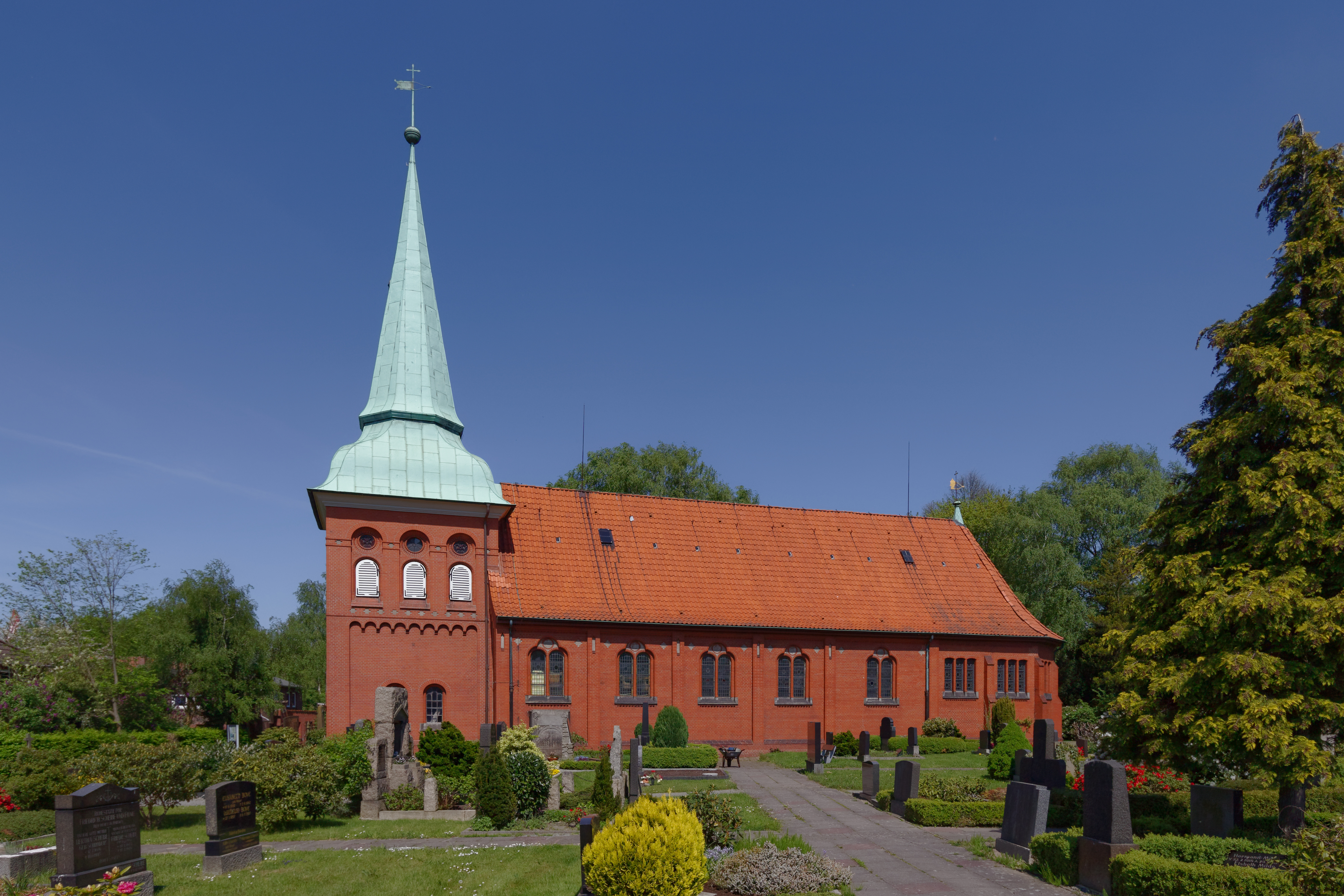
St.Maria-Magdalena-Kirche in Moorburg

The Moorburg coal power plant started in 1974 at the harbour. The most recent generator opened in 2015, and closed in 2021.
