= Hamburg-Neugraben station =

Railway station in Neugraben-Fischbek, Germany

Hamburg Neugraben
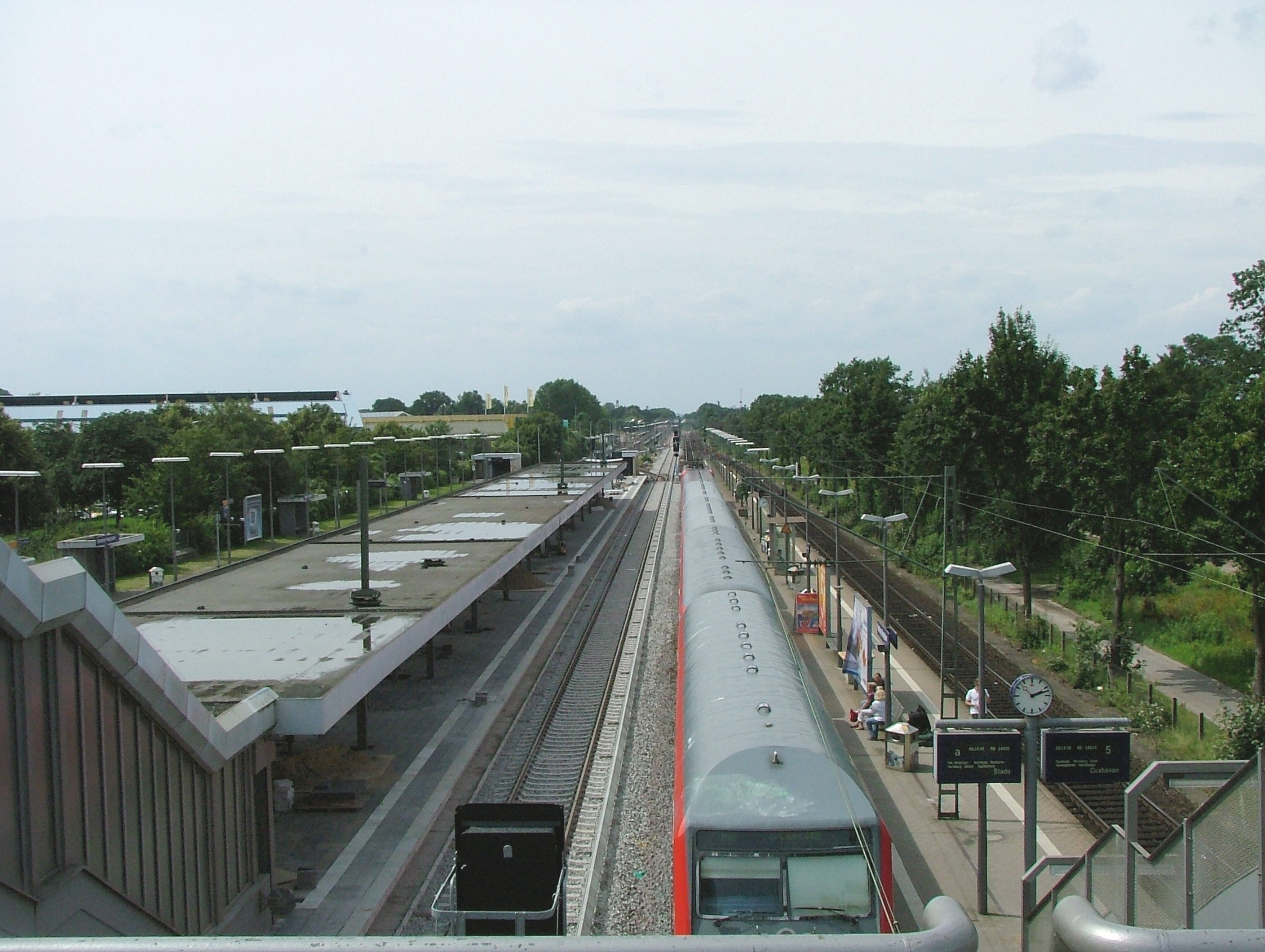

General information
- Location: Am Neugrabener Bahnhof 1; 21149 Hamburg; Germany
- Coordinates: 53°28′26″N 9°51′5″E
- Owner: DB Netz
- Operator: DB Station&Service
- Line: Lower Elbe Railway
- Platforms: 2 island platforms and 1 side platform
- Tracks: 5
- Train operators: S-Bahn Hamburg

Construction
- Structure type: At grade
- Parking: Park and ride (863 slots)
- Accessible: Yes

Other information
- Station code: DB: 2520; Category: 4
- Fare zone: HVV: B/318

History
- Opened: 1 April 1881; 145 years ago
- Electrified: Main line: 29 September 1968; 57 years ago, 15 kV AC system (overhead); 4 August 1984; 42 years ago, 1200 V DC system (3rd rail)

Services
Preceding station	Hamburg S-Bahn	Following station
Neuwiedenthal towards Pinneberg	S3	Terminus
Neuwiedenthal towards Elbgaustraße	S5	Fischbek towards Stade
Location
- Location within Hamburg Location within Schleswig-Holstein Location within Germany Location within Europe

Hamburg-Neugraben or Neugraben railway station is situated in Neugraben-Fischbek, which is a quarter on the south-western border of Hamburg in north-western Germany. It serves frequent S-Bahn (mass-transit) trains between Pinneberg and Neugraben station (S3 service) and between Elbgaustraße station and Stade (S5 line).

Until January 2008, Neugraben station was the southern terminus of the S3 service. In January 2008 the S-Bahn track to Stade via Neu Wulmstorf and Buxtehude was completed and through services were added to the timetable. However, there are considerably fewer trains going to Buxtehude and/or Stade than finishing in Neugraben.

== Station layout ==
The station is an at-grade station with 5 tracks—including 3 for the Hamburg S-Bahn—and 2 island platforms and a side platform. Parking is available via park and ride.

== Service ==
Rail service at Hamburg-Neugraben station:

== See also ==
- Hamburger Verkehrsverbund (HVV)
- List of Hamburg S-Bahn stations
