= Drochtersen Shot Tower =

Shot tower in Lower Saxony, Germany

The Drochtersen Shot Tower is a 42-metre-high (138 ft) shot tower at Drochtersen, Lower Saxony, Germany. The Drochtersen Shot Tower is property of the "Jagd-Schrot & Hagel-Fabrik Häntler & Natermann" but it is not in use any more.

== See also ==
- List of towers
