= Bundesstraße 73 =

Federal highway in Germany

B 73
- Bundesstraße 73

Route information
- Length: 100 km (62 mi)

Major junctions
- Northwest end: Cuxhaven
- Southeast end: Hamburg

Location
- Country: Germany
- States: Lower Saxony, Hamburg

Highway system
- Roads in Germany; Autobahns; List; Federal; List; State; E-roads

The Bundesstraße 73 or B73 is a German federal highway running in a northwesterly to southeasterly direction from Cuxhaven to Hamburg. It runs partially beside the Bundesautobahn 26.
