= Hamburg Metropolitan Region =

Coordinates: 53.5°N 10.0°E

Hamburg Metropolitan Region Metropolregion Hamburg (German)
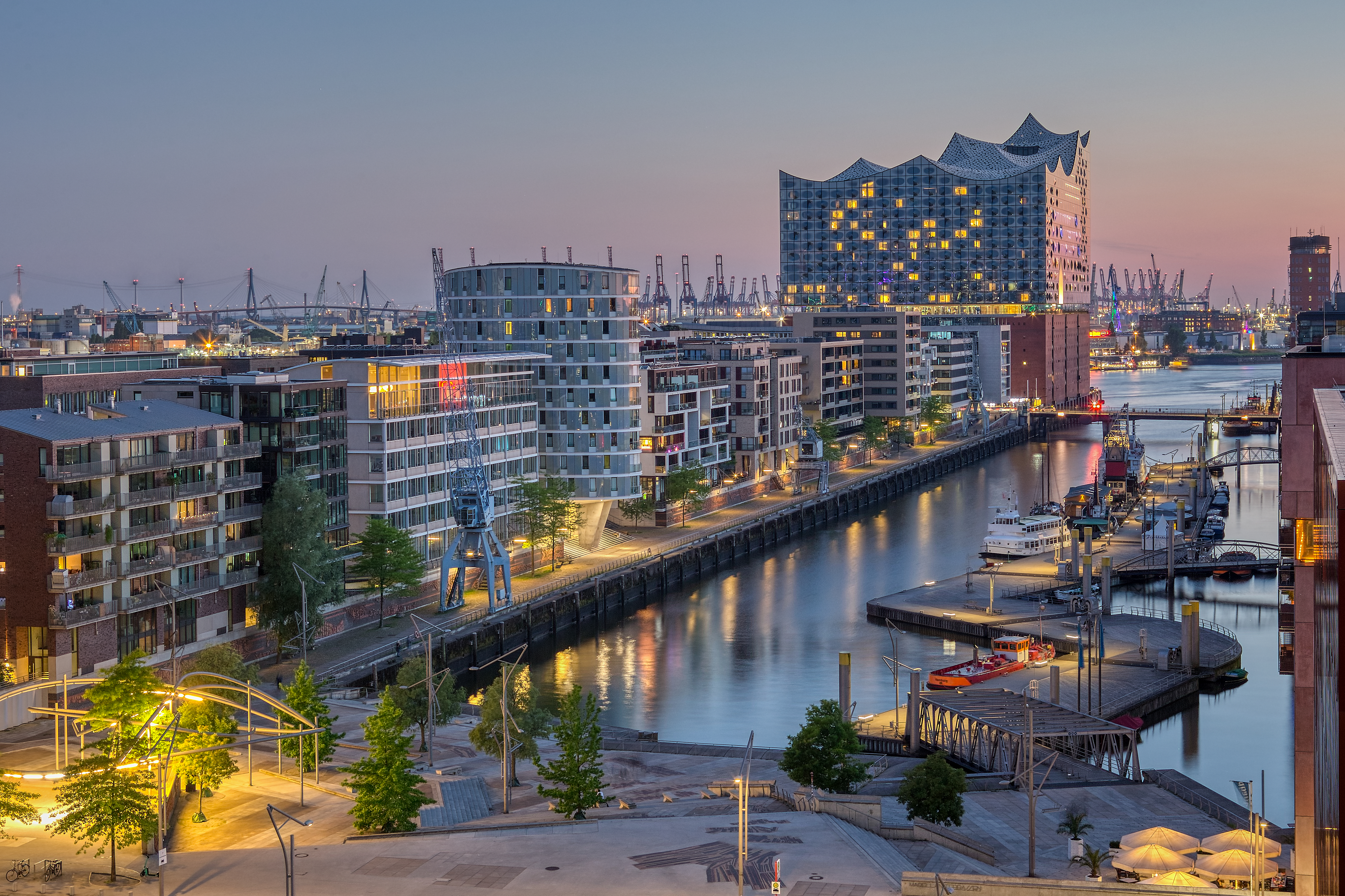
- Hamburg

- Logo
- Anthem: Stadt Hamburg an der Elbe Auen
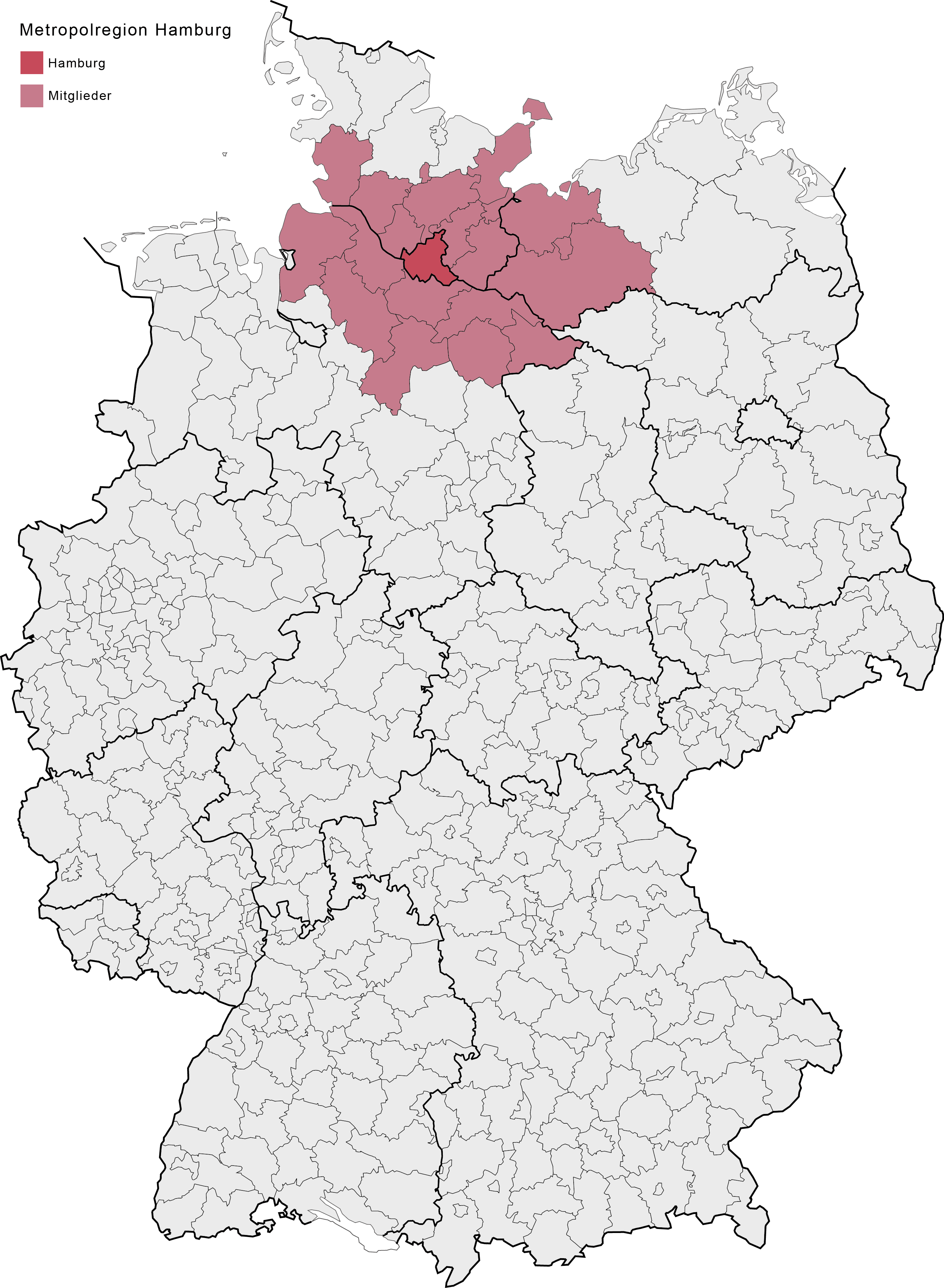
- Location of the Hamburg metropolitan region in Germany
- Country: Germany
- States: Hamburg; Lower Saxony; Schleswig-Holstein; Mecklenburg-Vorpommern
- Largest Cities: Hamburg, Lübeck
- Established: 1 January 2006

Area
  - Metro: 26,000 km^{2} (10,000 sq mi)

Population
  - Metro: 5,100,000
  - Metro density: 192/km^{2} (500/sq mi)

GDP
  - Metro: €249.406 billion (2021)
- Time zone: UTC+1 (CET)
- Website: www.metropolregion.hamburg.de

The Hamburg Metropolitan Region (German: Metropolregion Hamburg) is a metropolitan region centred around the city of Hamburg in northern Germany, consisting of eight districts (Landkreise) in the federal state of Lower Saxony, six districts (Kreise) in the state of Schleswig-Holstein and two districts in the state of Mecklenburg-Vorpommern along with the city-state of Hamburg itself. It covers an area of roughly 26,000 square kilometres (10,000 sq mi) and is home to more than 5.1 million inhabitants.

== History ==
On 1 January 2006 the office of the Hamburg Metropolitan Region opened, as agreed in a state treaty of cooperation (Staatsvertrag über Zusammenarbeit) between Hamburg, Lower Saxony and Schleswig-Holstein.

== Geography ==
As of 2005, the Hamburg Metropolitan Region was made up of the city of Hamburg along with numerous rural districts in Lower Saxony and Schleswig-Holstein, altogether comprising 800 cities, towns and municipalities with an overall land area of 19,802 square kilometres (7,646 sq mi). Since then it has expanded to cover the districts of Ludwigslust-Parchim (partially from 2012, entirely from 2017) and Nordwestmecklenburg (from 2012) in the state of Mecklenburg-Vorpommern.

States and districts

State	District^{*}	Population (2012)	Area	Pop. density (2012)
Hamburg	–	1,813,587	755 km^{2}	2,400/km^{2}
Lower Saxony	Cuxhaven	198,115	2,073 km^{2}	96/km^{2}
Lower Saxony	Harburg	239,269	1,245 km^{2}	190/km^{2}
Lower Saxony	Lüchow-Dannenberg	49,082	1,220 km^{2}	40/km^{2}
Lower Saxony	Lüneburg	174,685	1,323 km^{2}	130/km^{2}
Lower Saxony	Rotenburg	162,182	2,070 km^{2}	78/km^{2}
Lower Saxony	Soltau-Fallingbostel	136,072	1,873 km^{2}	73/km^{2}
Lower Saxony	Stade	195,606	1,266 km^{2}	150/km^{2}
Lower Saxony	Uelzen	93,284	1,454 km^{2}	64/km^{2}
Mecklenburg-Vorpommern	Ludwigslust^{†}	122,564	2,517 km^{2}	49/km^{2}
Mecklenburg-Vorpommern	Nordwestmecklenburg	155,801	2,117 km^{2}	74/km^{2}
Schleswig-Holstein	Dithmarschen	132,965	1,405 km^{2}	95/km^{2}
Schleswig-Holstein	Lauenburg	187,905	1,263 km^{2}	150/km^{2}
Schleswig-Holstein	Lübeck	211,713	214 km^{2}	990/km^{2}
Schleswig-Holstein	Neumünster	76,951	72 km^{2}	1,100/km^{2}
Schleswig-Holstein	Ostholstein	197,882	1,391 km^{2}	140/km^{2}
Schleswig-Holstein	Pinneberg	298,826	664 km^{2}	450/km^{2}
Schleswig-Holstein	Segeberg	261,988	1,334 km^{2}	200/km^{2}
Schleswig-Holstein	Steinburg	130,135	1,056 km^{2}	120/km^{2}
Schleswig-Holstein	Stormarn	232,911	766 km^{2}	300/km^{2}
Hamburg Metropolitan Region		4,990,307	26078 km^{2}	191/km^{2}

Largest cities and towns

City^{*} or town	Population (2012)	Area	Pop. density (2012)
Hamburg	1,813,587	755 km^{2}	2,400/km^{2}
Lübeck	211,713	214 km^{2}	990/km^{2}
Schwerin	95,818	130 km^{2}	730/km^{2}
Neumünster	76,951	72 km^{2}	1,100/km^{2}
Norderstedt	74,574	58 km^{2}	1,300/km^{2}
Lüneburg	70,438	70 km^{2}	1,000/km^{2}
Cuxhaven	48,829	162 km^{2}	300/km^{2}
Elmshorn	47,490	21 km^{2}	2,200/km^{2}
Stade	45,198	110 km^{2}	410/km^{2}
Wismar	42,433	41 km^{2}	1,000/km^{2}
Pinneberg	41,726	22 km^{2}	1,900/km^{2}
Seevetal	39,921	105 km^{2}	380/km^{2}
Buxtehude	39,858	76 km^{2}	520/km^{2}
Buchholz i. d. N.	36,875	75 km^{2}	490/km^{2}
Uelzen	33,467	136 km^{2}	250/km^{2}
Winsen (Luhe)	32,638	110 km^{2}	300/km^{2}
Wedel	31,725	34 km^{2}	940/km^{2}
Ahrensburg	31,292	35 km^{2}	890/km^{2}
Itzehoe	30,956	28 km^{2}	1,100/km^{2}
Geesthacht	29,098	33 km^{2}	880/km^{2}
Reinbek	26,347	31 km^{2}	840/km^{2}

* Districts and independent (German: kreisfrei) cities.
^{†} Ludwigslust was merged into Ludwigslust-Parchim in 2011; pop. data for 2010

District free city

=== Larger Urban Zones ===
4. Hamburg metropolitan region

Regions of Europe with the largest GDP per capita, Hamburg #4

The Hamburg Larger Urban Zone (LUZ) as defined by Eurostat's Urban Audit covers an area of 7,303 km^{2} and in 2004 had a population of 3,134,620 inhabitants. The Larger Urban Zone covers only the city of Hamburg and its directly neighbouring districts. The Hamburg LUZ corresponds with the service area of the Hamburger Verkehrsverbund (HVV) transport association with an average population density of at least 150 inhabitants/km^{2}.

State	District^{*}	Population (2012)	Area	Pop. density (2012)
Hamburg	–	1,813,587	755 km^{2}	2,400/km^{2}
Lower Saxony	Harburg	239,269	1,245 km^{2}	190/km^{2}
	Stade	195,606	1,266 km^{2}	150/km^{2}
Schleswig-Holstein	Lauenburg	187,905	1,263 km^{2}	150/km^{2}
	Pinneberg	298,826	664 km^{2}	450/km^{2}
	Segeberg	261,988	1,334 km^{2}	200/km^{2}
	Stormarn	232,911	766 km^{2}	300/km^{2}
Hamburg LUZ		2,903,198		
Schleswig-Holstein	Lübeck	211,713	214.13 km^{2}	990/km^{2}
	Ostholstein	197,882	1,391 km^{2}	140/km^{2}
Lübeck LUZ		391,373		
Bremen	Bremerhaven^{†}	112,895	78,87 km^{2}	1,400/km^{2}
Lower Saxony	Cuxhaven	198,115	2,073 km^{2}	96/km^{2}
Bremerhaven LUZ		288,635		

* Districts and independent (German: kreisfrei) cities.
^{†} not part of the Hamburg Metropolitan Region

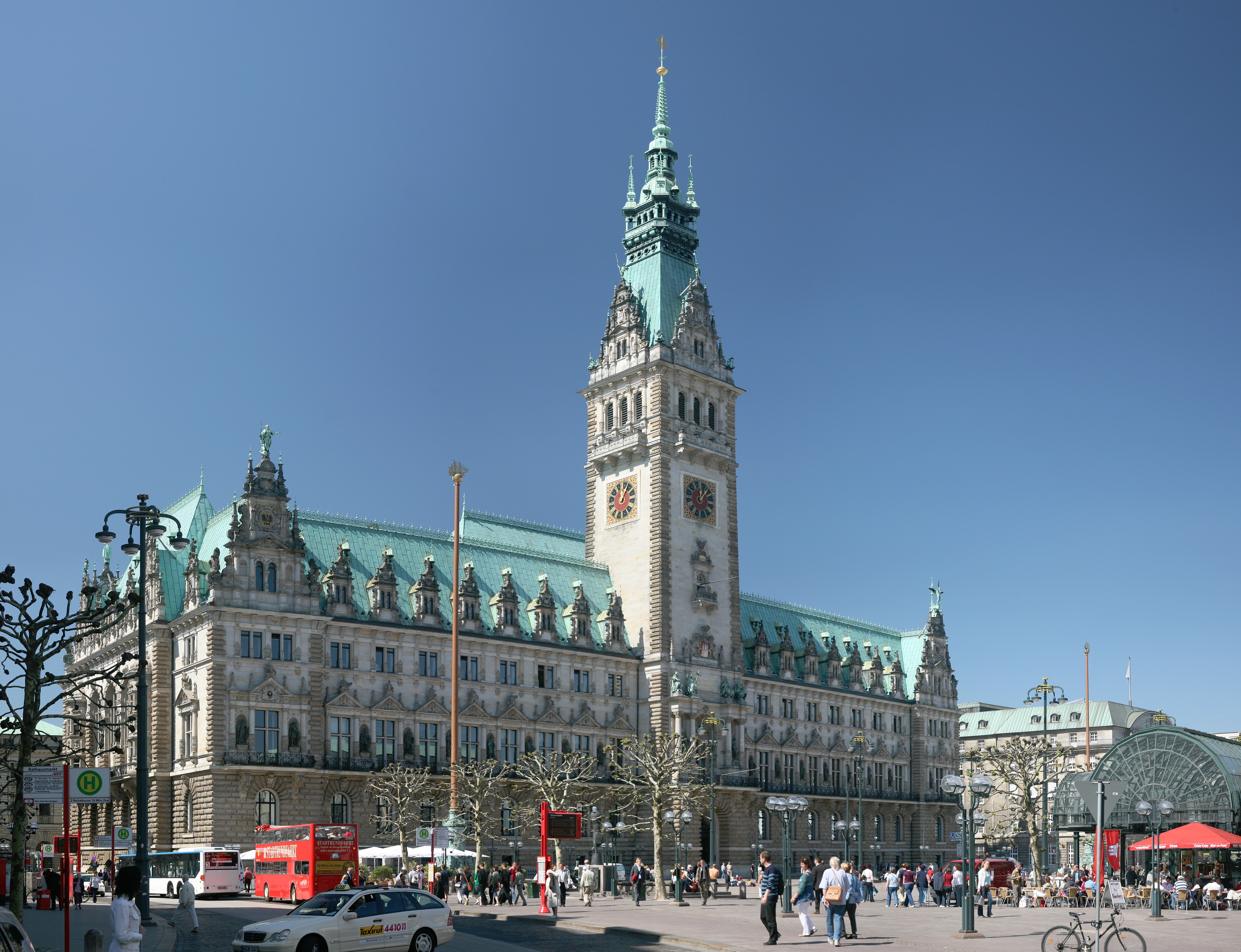
Hamburg City Hall (Rathaus), seat of the Hamburg Senate

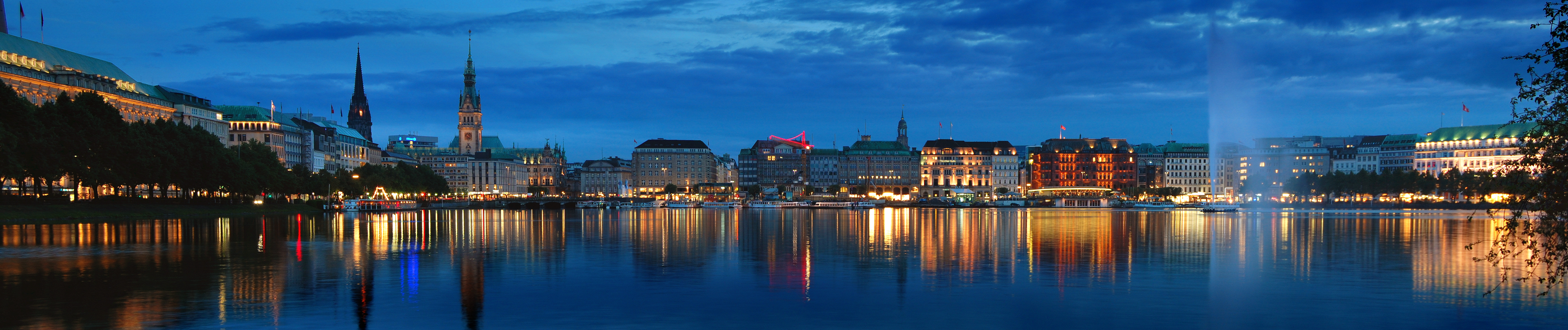
Hamburg's Binnenalster lake

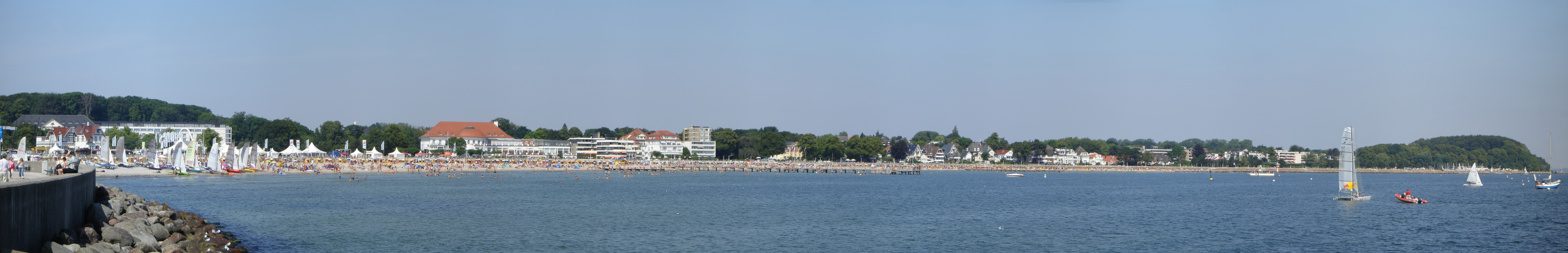
Travemünde, seaside resort in Lübeck

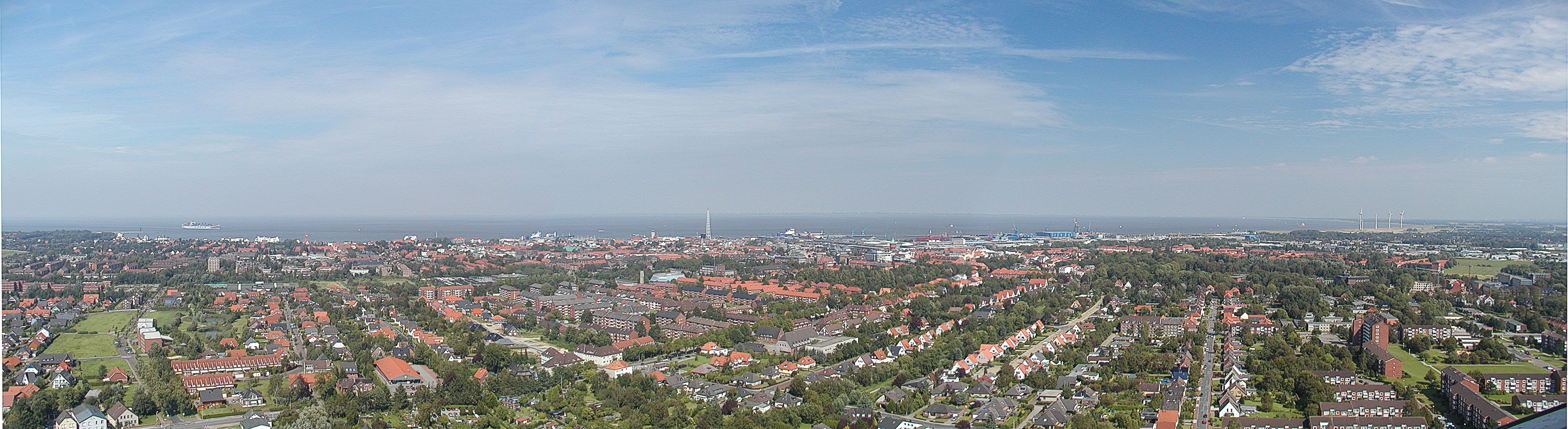
Cuxhaven

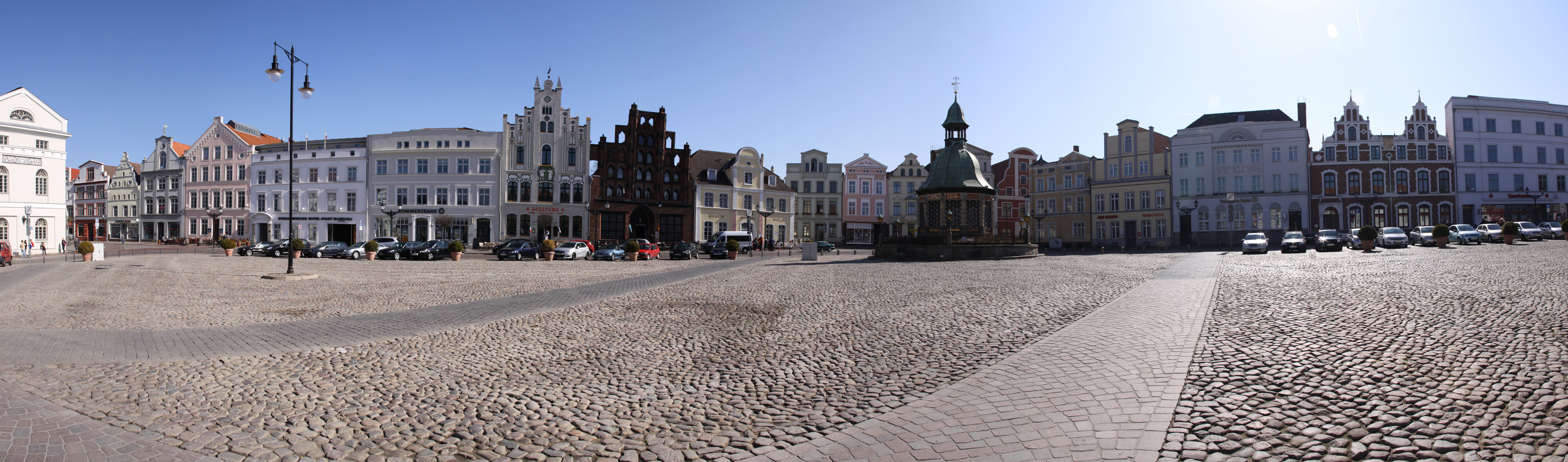
Historic market place (Marktplatz) in Wismar

== See also ==
- Metropolitan regions in Germany
- List of metropolitan areas in the European Union by GDP
