= Steinkirchen, Lower Saxony =

Steinkirchen
- Municipality
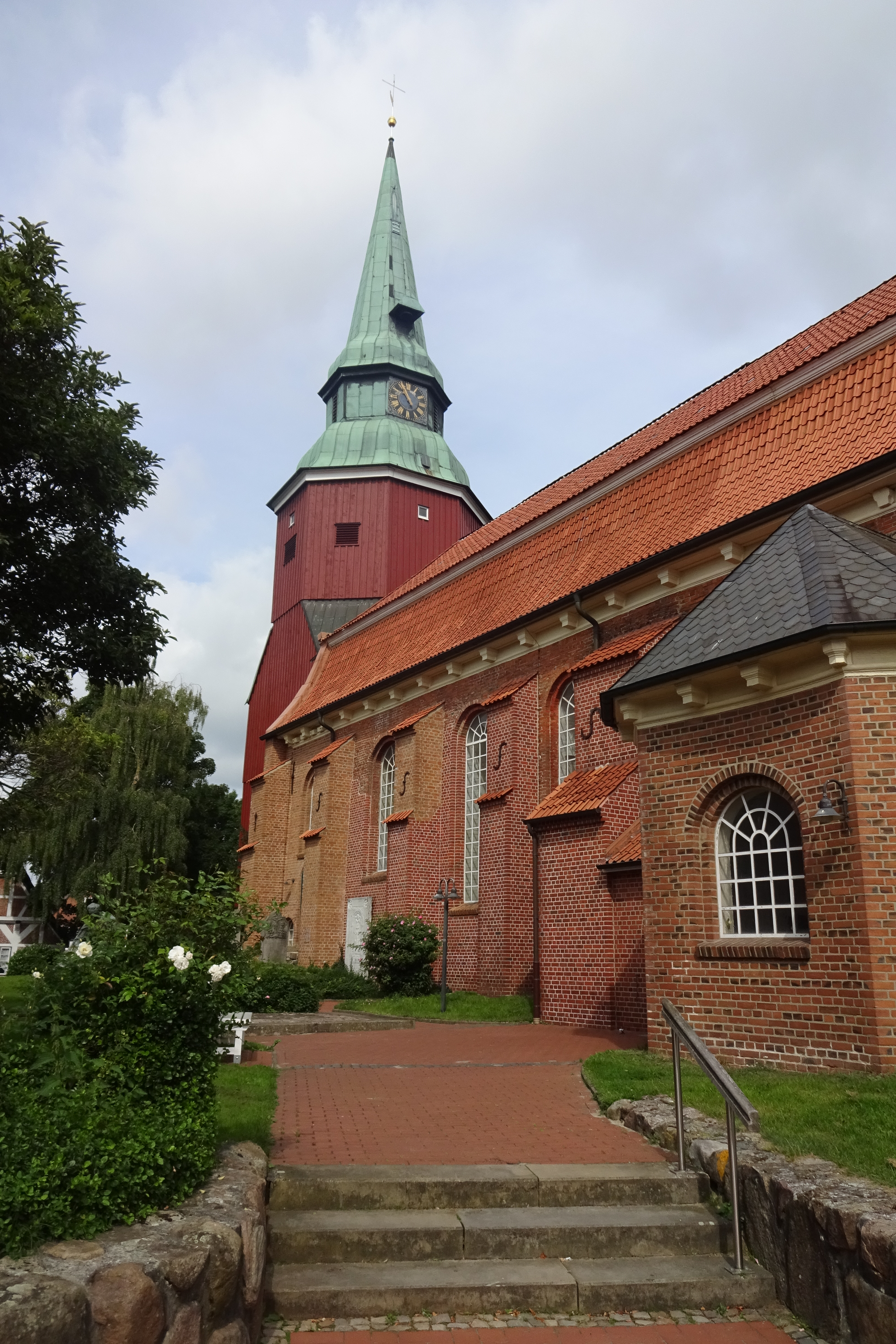
- St. Nicholas and St. Martin Church, Steinkirchen

- Coat of arms

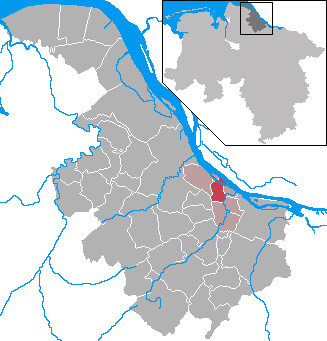
- Location of Steinkirchen within Stade district
- Interactive map of Steinkirchen
- Location within Germany Location within Lower Saxony
- Coordinates: 53°33′N 09°36′E
- Country: Germany
- State: Lower Saxony
- District: Stade
- Municipal assoc.: Lühe

Government
  - Mayor: Sonja Zinke (CDU)

Area
  - Total: 9.55 km^{2} (3.69 sq mi)
- Elevation: 7 m (23 ft)

Population (2025-12-31)
  - Total: 1,731
  - Density: 181/km^{2} (469/sq mi)
- Time zone: UTC+01:00 (CET)
  - Summer (DST): UTC+02:00 (CEST)
- Postal codes: 21720
- Dialling codes: 04142
- Vehicle registration: STD
- Website: luehe.de

Steinkirchen (German pronunciation: [ˈʃtaɪnkɪʁçn̩]; Low German: Steenkark) is a municipality in the district of Stade, Lower Saxony, Germany.

== Geography ==
The municipality is located in the Altes Land, the largest continuous orchard and fruit harvesting region in Europe. It is situated by the Elbe and Lühe rivers and is bordered by the municipalities (in clockwise order) Grünendeich, Jork, Mittelnkirchen, Guderhandviertel, Agathenburg and Hollern-Twielenfleth. The southeasterly third of the Elbe island Lühesand forms part of the municipal area.

== History ==
It belonged to the Prince-Archbishopric of Bremen. In 1648 the Prince-Archbishopric was transformed into the Duchy of Bremen, which was first ruled in personal union by the Swedish and from 1715 on by the Hanoverian Crown. In 1823 the Duchy was abolished and its territory became part of the Stade Region.

== Politics ==
=== Municipality council ===
As of February 2020, the council is composed of:

- Christian Democratic Union of Germany (CDU): 5 seats
- Social Democratic Party of Germany (SPD): 4 seats
- Alliance 90/The Greens (Grüne): 1 seat
- Independent: 1 seat

=== Mayor/Mayoress ===
The mayoress of Steinkirchen is Sonja Zinke (CDU, elected as Independent) since 2014. Deputy mayor is Jürgen Michaelis (SPD).

== Notable buildings ==
- St. Martini et Nicolai church with the world famous organ of St. Martini et Nicolai [de]
- Hogendiekbrücke, a pedestrian bascule bridge over the Lühe river
- Transmission tower of the Elbe Crossing 2, the tallest transmission towers in Europe

== Economy and infrastructure ==
=== Transport ===
Three bus lines run by the KVG Stade stop in Steinkirchen. These are:

- 2050 Stade - Hollern-Twielenfleth - Steinkirchen - Jork - Hamburg-Cranz
- 2030 Buxtehude - Dammhausen - Jork - Borstel - Steinkirchen
- 2053 Grünendeich - Steinkirchen - Horneburg

These are part of the HVV and thus can be made use of with a regular ticket.

Additionally, some school bus and company bus lines operate in Steinkirchen.

=== Education ===
Steinkirchen is home to the Schulzentrum Lühe, a school complex with an elementary school and an Oberschule.

== Notable people ==
- Dörte Hansen, linguist and writer, lived there for over 10 years
