= Carsten Eggers =

German sculptor and painter (1957–2021)

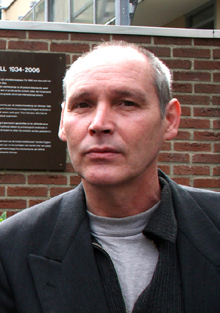
- Eggers in 2007
- Born: 18 May 1957; Stade, Germany
- Died: 29 September 2021 (aged 64); Hamburg, Germany
- Website: carsten-eggers.de

Carsten Eggers (18 May 1957 – 29 September 2021) was a German sculptor and painter. There are about 20 realistic bronze sculptures of his in northern Germany and the Netherlands. His best-known works are a bronze bust of Rudi Carrell and a larger-than-life monument of boxing legend Max Schmeling.

== Early life and education ==
The son of the impressionist painter Richard Eggers, Carsten Eggers was born in Stade, in Lower Saxony, and grew up in the town of Jork in the Altes Land region, an area of reclaimed marshland on the Elbe downstream from Hamburg. Deciding against an academic career he studied all aspects of painting with his father, an accomplished artist who in 1975, was awarded the Knight's Cross of the Order of Merit of the Federal Republic of Germany (Bundesverdienstkreuz am Bande) for his life's work. At the age of only 17, Eggers designed the coat of arms of the municipality of Jork. In 1979 he had his first exhibition of paintings, in his home town of Jork, together with his father.

After 1980 he turned to sculpture, studying under Professor Franz Rotter in Cuxhaven, and from 1983 he studied Sculpture under Karl Heinz Türk at the Freie Kunstakademie (Free Art Academy) in Nürtingen. Defying the usual conventions, Eggers kept himself to himself, shunned the arts "establishment", and was not a member of any artists' associations. Since 1991 Eggers has lived and worked at a former farm in Nottensdorf in the rural district of Stade.\

== Death ==
Eggers died aged 64 on 29 September 2021, in hospital in Hamburg.

== Works ==
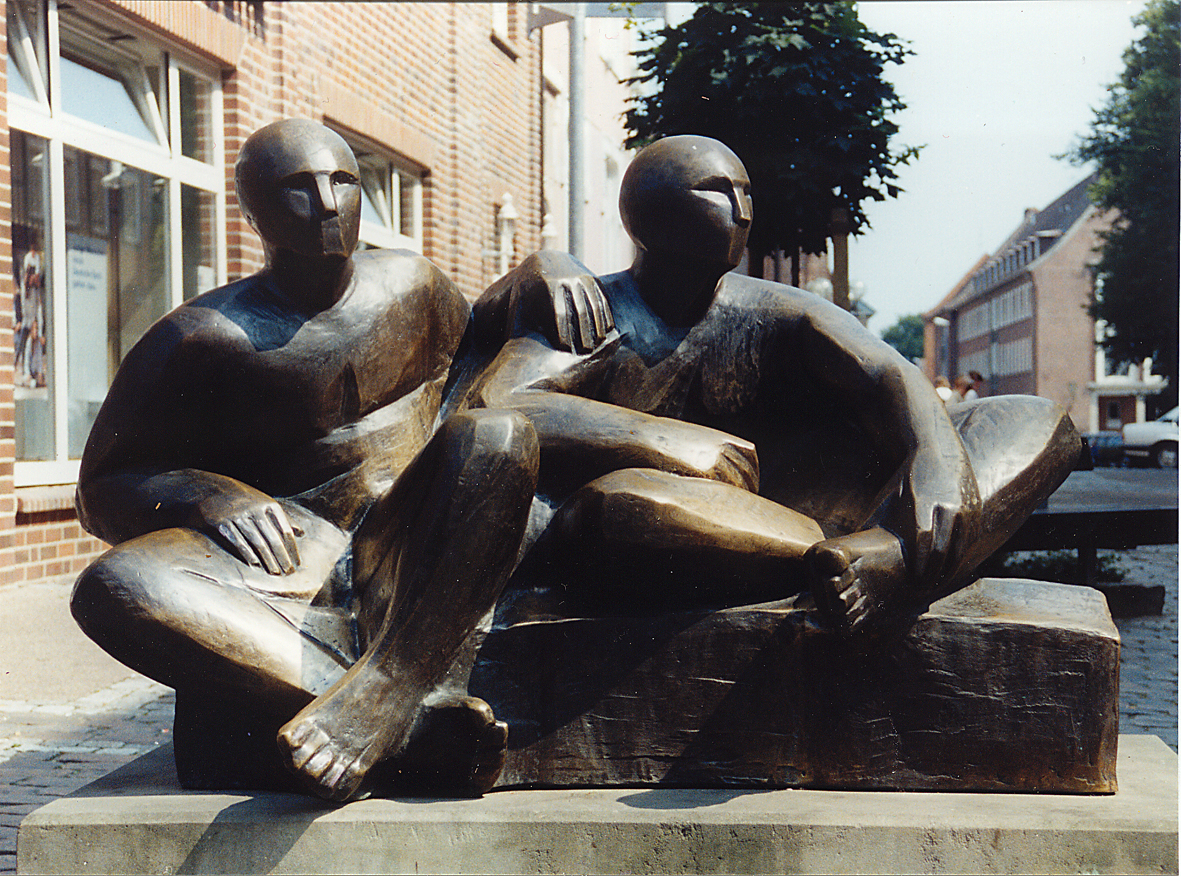
Die Wachenden (The Watchers), Stade

Eggers' early sculptures were stylized, as in the 1986 larger-than-life bronze Die Wachenden (The Watchers), which was commissioned by the town of Stade. He later turned to realism, which characterizes all of his other bronzes in public places. Eggers first makes clay models of his subjects, which include busts of famous people. They are cast first in plaster of Paris and then in bronze. The clients who commission his works are towns and other municipalities, and private-sector patrons of the arts. Eggers' works always have humans as their focus. Many of his sculptures show people in everyday situations. these are all based on live models. Two works of historical significance are the larger-than-life bronze sculptures, known as the Zwillingsbrüder (Twin Brothers), of the dedicated clergyman (Henry the Priest), the founder of the Altes Land and a symbol of international understanding: one of the statues, Mönch Heinrich (Henry the Monk) stands outside the church in Steinkirchen and was erected in 1992; the other Priester Hendrik (Henry the Priest) stands outside the church in Rijnsaterwoude (Netherlands) and was erected in 2001.

Carsten Eggers's bronze sculptures

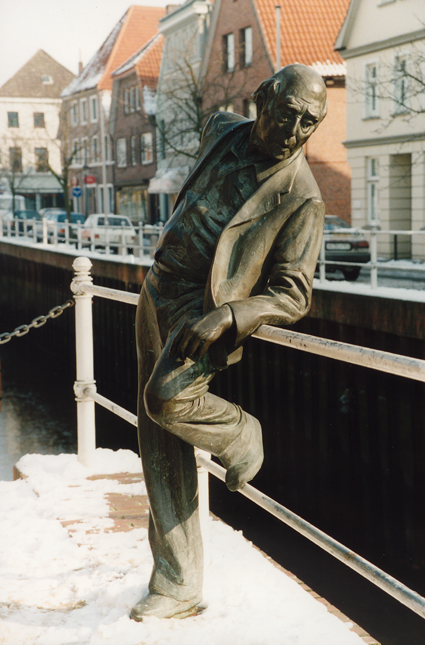
Flethenkieker (Man by the Canal) in Buxtehude

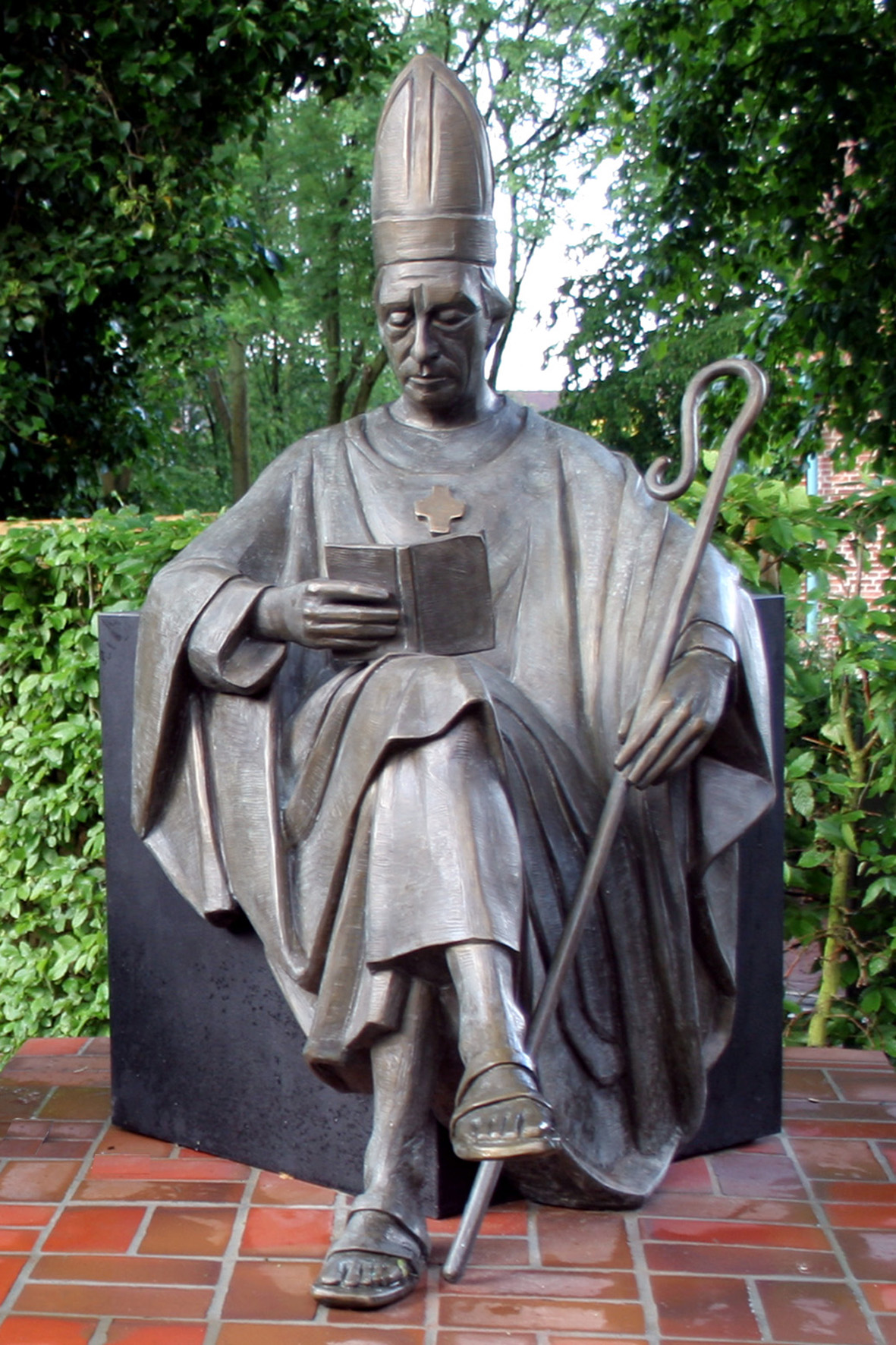
Erz-Abt zu Harsefeld (The Archabbot of Harsefeld) in Harsefeld

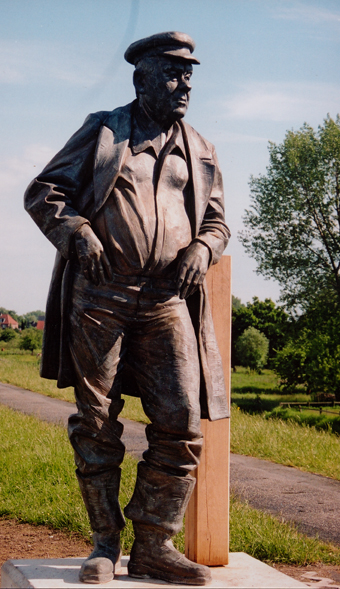
Deichgraf (The Dijkgraaf, 2000, Krautsand

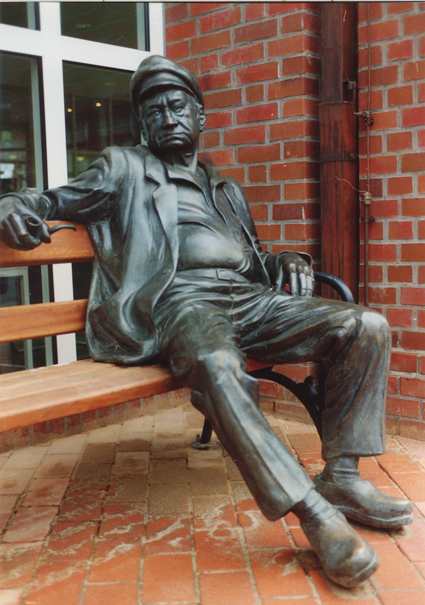
De ole Schipper (The Old Mariner), Estebrügge

== Characteristics of the bronze sculptures ==
Typical characteristics of Eggers sculptures are the casual poses and a very slight exaggeration. As the scholar and art critic Klaus Frerichs said, "Sein Realismus scheint darin zu bestehen, dass man zu erkennen glaubt, was die Figuren darstellen. Aber sie sind weder Abbilder noch Karikaturen. Eggers zeichnet Begriffe zu Bildern. Mimik, Gestik, Haltung – nichts ist Zufall." [His realism seems to be such that you think you know what the figures represent. But they are neither copies nor caricatures. Eggers portrays concepts as images. Facial expressions, gestures, posture –nothing is random.]

A slightly exaggerated belly, a few more wrinkles on the face, the nose a bit longer: all this together has an amazing effect. In the end the bronze image is a better likeness than the original. Art critics call Eggers' works "whole-body portraits". Art historian Hanns Theodor Flemming (who died in 2005) stated: "Carsten Eggers Plastiken sind das Ergebnis künstlerischer Gestaltung, die jeder herkömmlichen Gegenständlichkeit trotzen und durch Lebendigkeit aufmerksam machen. Seine Stärke ist es, die menschlichen Stärken und Schwächen einzufangen. Ein Künstler, der völlig losgelöst von jeweiligen Trends seinen Weg geht." [Carsten Eggers' sculptures are the result of an artistic composition that means they defy conventional realism and attract attention by their vibrancy. His forte is capturing human strength and weakness. An artist who goes his own way without regard to the current trends.] The artist sees his work as memorials of serenity running counter to the short-termism and hectic pace of today's life and thus representing an opposing pole to them.

== Paintings ==
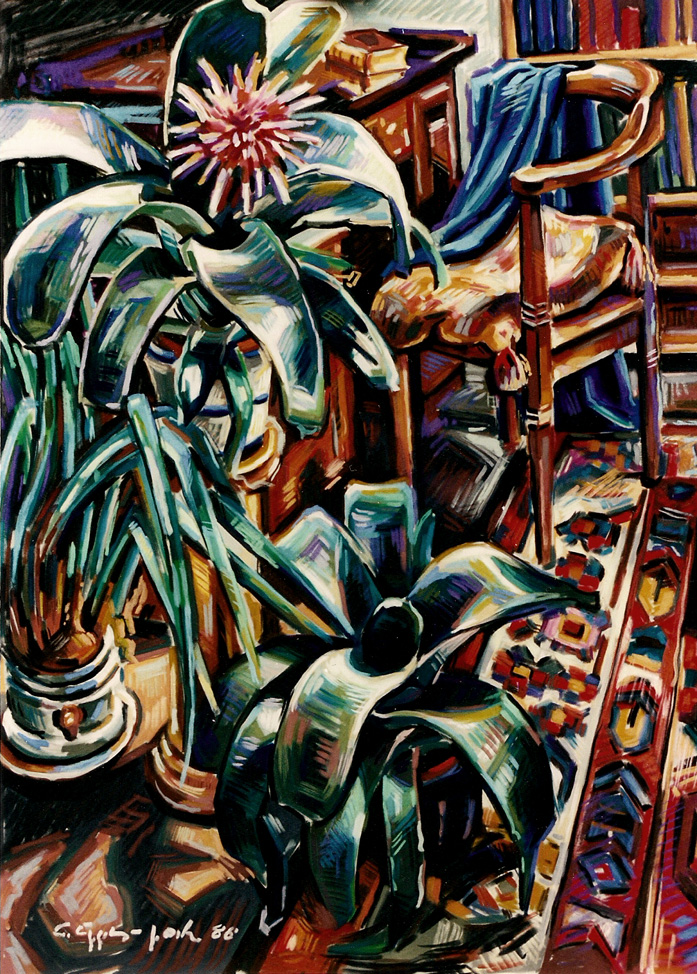
Blätter-Komposition (Leaf Composition), pastel 90 cm × 120 cm

Eggers' paintings are very varied thematically. The early works are strongly influenced by expressionism. After an impressionist phase his style became more and more characterized by realism. The realism of his paintings became more pronounced during his study trips to America, China, Brazil, France, Madeira, Portugal, Spain and Tunisia, which lasted several months,

Together with his change in style he switches to pastel, and adds portraits, nudes, and elaborate compositions to his repertoire This leads to oversized pastel paintings, some comprising five elements and up to four metres wide, hanging in public places.

Carsten Eggers's paintings

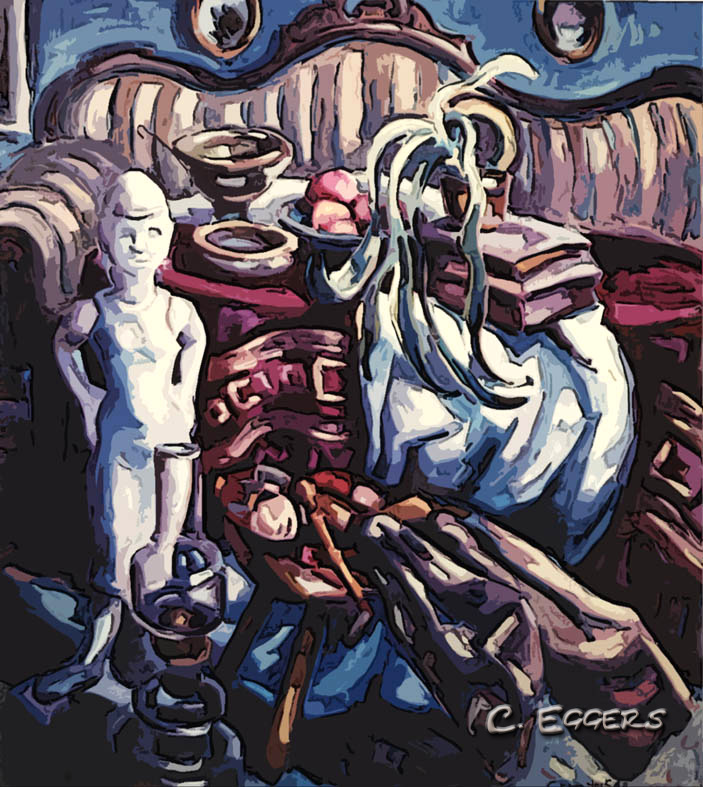
Figuren-Stilleben

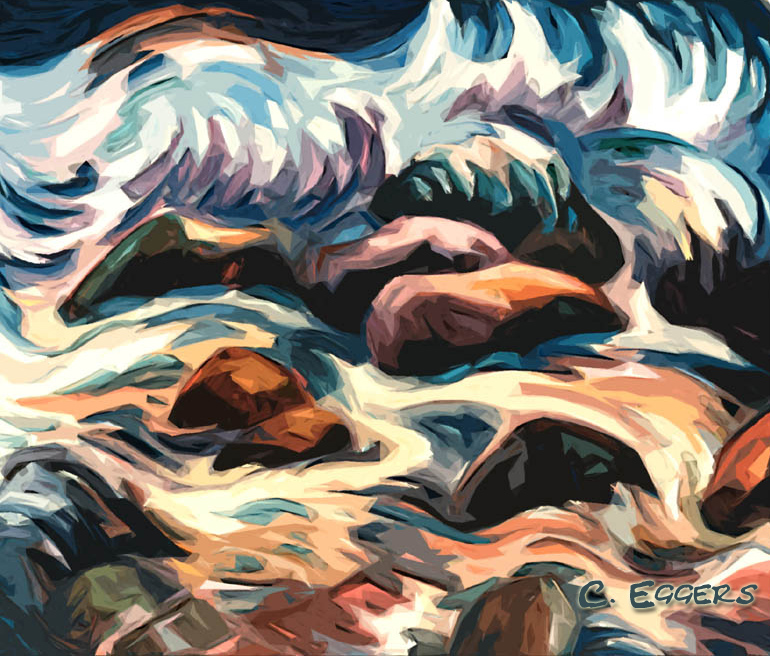
Wasserspiel

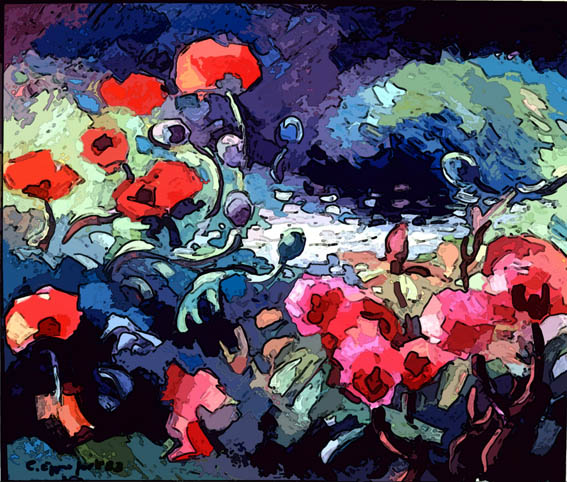
Mohn-Landschaft (Poppy Landscape), drawing, 60 cm × 80 cm

== Works in public places ==
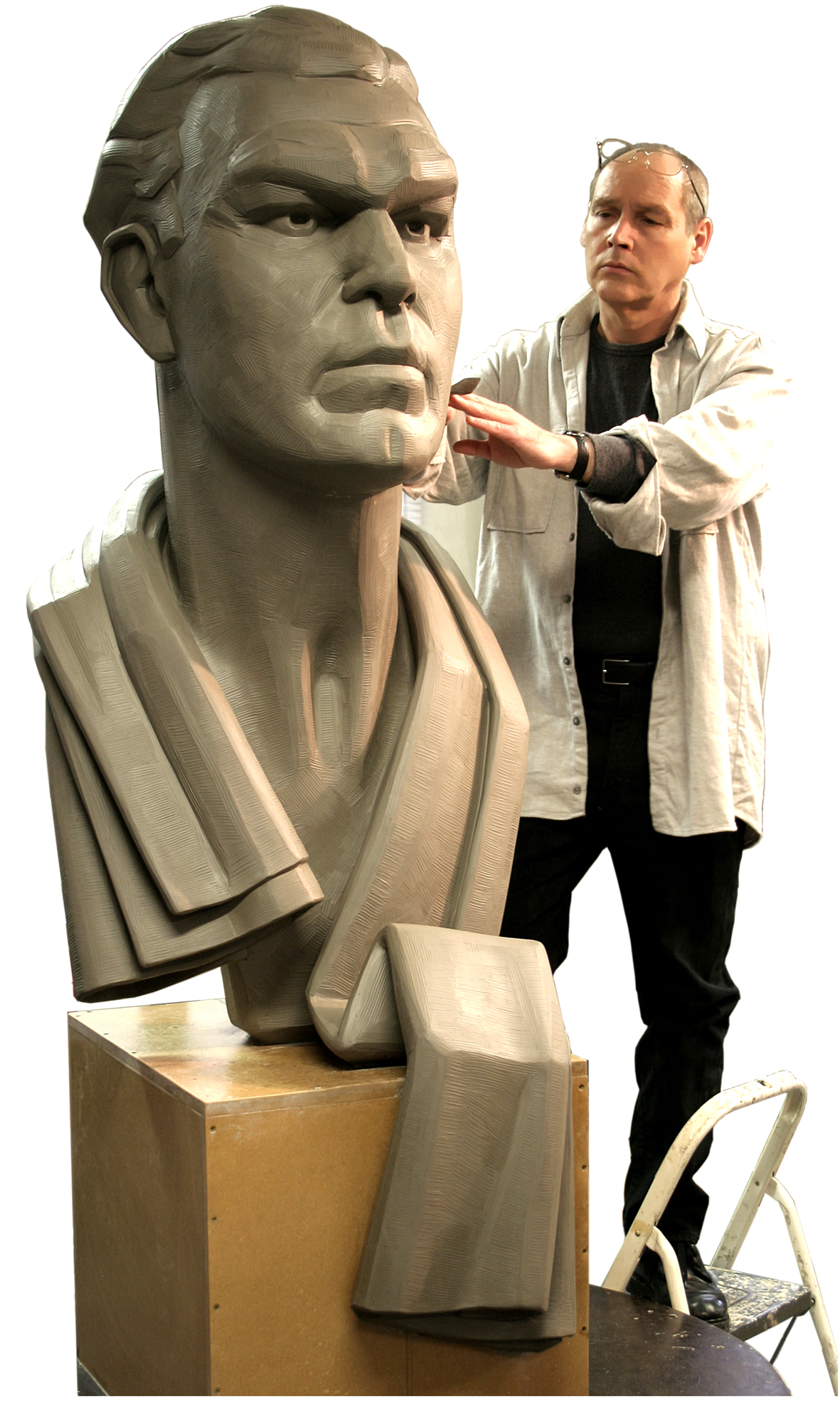
The artist and the Max Schmeling monument

- Die Wachenden [The Watchers] (Stade, town centre) 1986, bronze, larger-than-life
- Flethenkieker [Man by the Canal], (Buxtehude, town centre) 1989, bronze, life-size
- De ole Schipper [The Old Mariner] (Estebrügge, town centre) 1989, bronze, life-size
- Drei Generationen [Three Generations] (Rotenburg, town centre) 1995, bronze, life-size
- Mönch Heinrich [Henry the Monk] (Steinkirchen, Church of St. Martini-et-Nicolai) 1992, bronze, larger-than-life
- Priester Hendrik [Henry the Priest] (Netherlands, Rijnsaterwoude) 2001, bronze, larger-than-life
- Deichgraf [The Dijkgraaf] (Krautsand) 2000, bronze larger-than-life
- Liborius (Bremervörde, town centre) 1993, bronze, life-size
- Lesender Mönch [Monk, reading] (Stade, town centre) 1987, bronze, life-size
- Erkennender Petrus [St. Peter Seeing the Truth] (Hamburg, city centre) 1999, bronze, life-size
- Bust of Friedrich Huth (Harsefeld, town centre) 1998, bronze, larger-than-life
- Feldarbeiterin [Woman Working in the Fields] (Deinste, town centre) 1993,
- Johannis [St. John] (Neuenkirchen, church) 1993, bronze, life-size
- Bust of Hermann Rauhe (Hochschule für Musik und Theater Hamburg) 1993, bronze life-size
- Skuld (Horneburg, town centre) 2005, bronze, life-size
- Bust of RudiCarrell (Netherlands, Alkmaar, Rudi Carrellplaats) 2007, bronze, larger-than-life
- Erz-Abt zu Harsefeld [The Archabbot of Harsefeld] (Harsefeld) 2009, bronze, life-size
- Max-Schmeling-Denkmal [Max Schmeling monument] (Hollenstedt) 2010, bronze bust, larger-than-life

== Exhibitions ==
- International Hanseatic Days, Town Hall Braunschweig, 1986
- Faces and views – Altes Land Museum, Jork, 1991
- Death-defying – Museum of Sepulchral Culture, Kassel, September 2006 – February 2007
