= Lühe (river) =

River in Germany

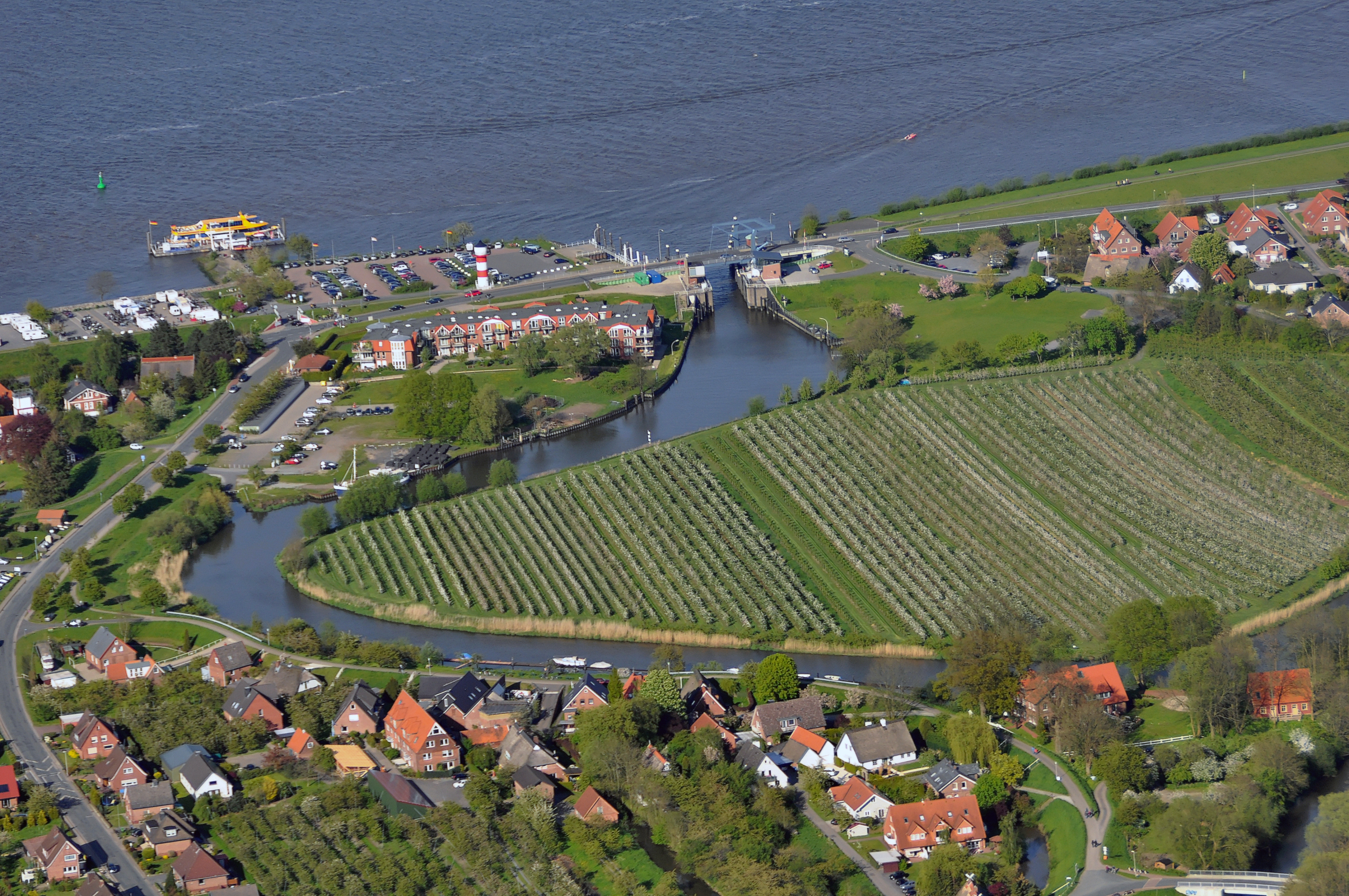
- Lühe with the Lühe Tidal Barrage at its mouth into the Elbe in Lühe

Location
- Country: Germany
- State: Lower Saxony
- Reference no.: DE: 596

Physical characteristics
- Source
  - location: Confluence of the Aue and Landwettern in Horneburg; 53°30′43.5″N 9°35′27.25″E
- Mouth
  - location: Near Grünendeich into the Elbe; 53°34′18.5″N 9°38′3″E
- Length: 43.3 km (26.9 mi)
- Basin size: 216 km^{2} (83 sq mi)

Basin features
- Progression: Elbe→ North Sea
- Navigable: 12.7 km (7.9 mi)

Lühe (German pronunciation: [ˈlyːə]; Low Saxon: Lü(h)) is a river in northern Germany in the district of Stade in Lower Saxony, Germany.

Formed at Horneburg by the confluence of the rivers Aue and Landwettern, the Lühe flows through the Altes Land, then reaching the lower reaches of the Elbe near Grünendeich. It has a length of about 12.7 kilometres (7.9 mi). Including its source river Aue, its total length is 43.3 km (26.9 mi).

The Lühe's course forms the border between the Second Mile and the Third Mile (territorial subdivisions) of the Altes Land. The Lühe flows through the towns and villages of:

- Neuenkirchen in Altes Land,
- Guderhandviertel,
- Mittelnkirchen, and
- Steinkirchen in Altes Land,

The Lühe empties near Lühe, a locality of Jork, into the Elbe.

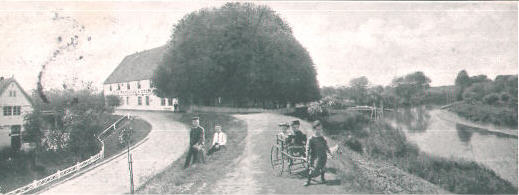
Lühe ferryhouse, 1900

== See also ==
- List of rivers of Lower Saxony
