= Lühe =

Municipality west of Hamburg, Germany

- Samtgemeinde
- Coat of arms

- Location of Lühe within Stade district
- Interactive map of Lühe
- Location within Germany Location within Lower Saxony
- Coordinates: 53°33′N 09°36′E
- Country: Germany
- State: Lower Saxony
- District: Stade
- Seat: Steinkirchen
- Subdivisions: 6 municipalities

Area
  - Total: 57.93 km^{2} (22.37 sq mi)

Population (2025-12-31)
  - Total: 9,806
  - Density: 169.3/km^{2} (438.4/sq mi)
- Time zone: UTC+01:00 (CET)
  - Summer (DST): UTC+02:00 (CEST)
- Website: www.luehe.de

Lühe is a Samtgemeinde ("collective municipality") in the Altes Land west of Hamburg (Germany). Lühe has a population of about 10,000 and belongs to the district of Stade, Lower Saxony. The seat of the municipality is in Steinkirchen. Lühe is named after the river Lühe which runs through Guderhandviertel, Mittelnkirchen, Neuenkirchen and Steinkirchen.

== Component municipalities ==
The Samtgemeinde Lühe consists of the following municipalities:

1. Grünendeich
2. Guderhandviertel
3. Hollern-Twielenfleth
4. Mittelnkirchen
5. Neuenkirchen
6. Steinkirchen
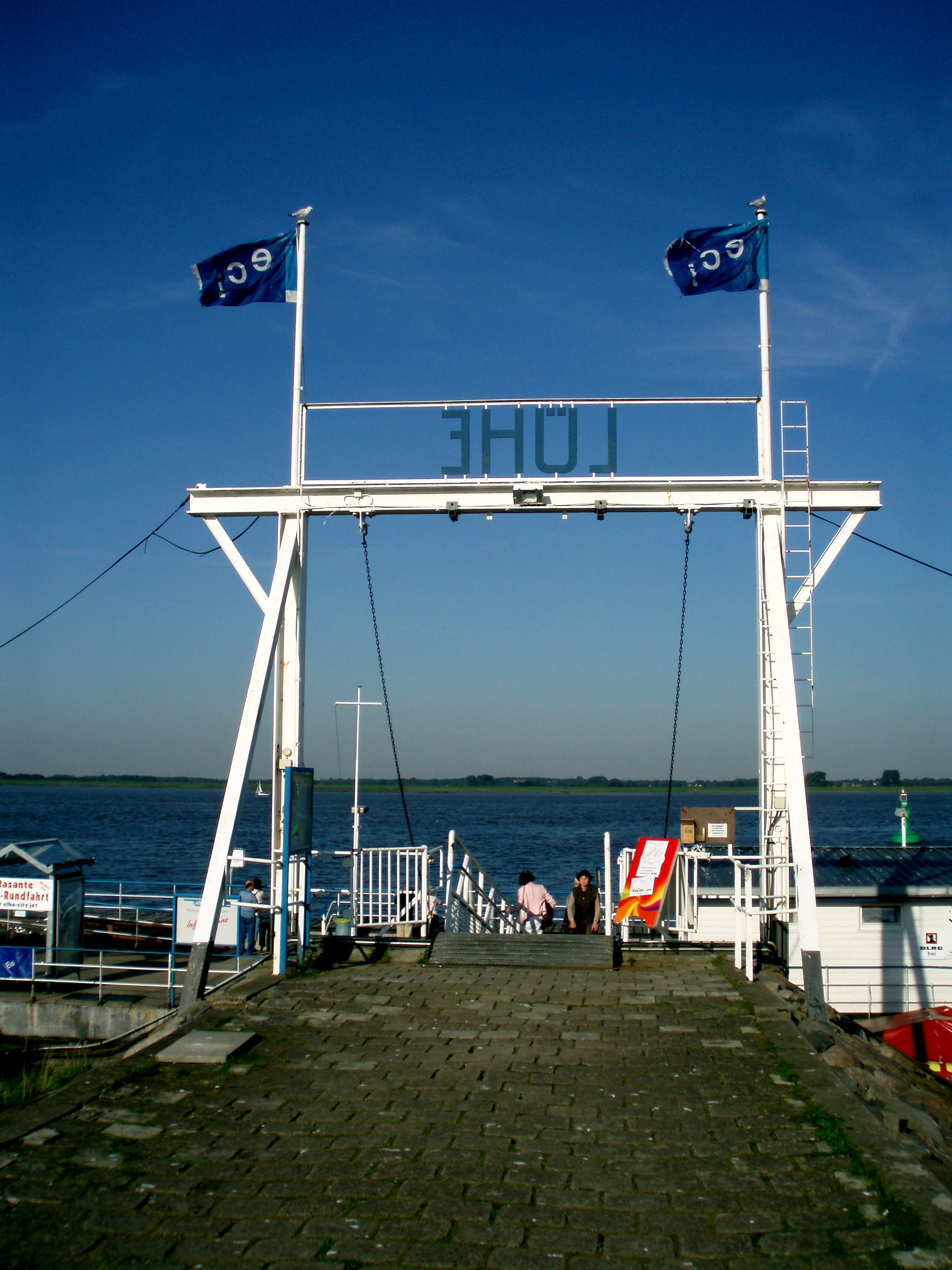
The pontoon quay in Lühe

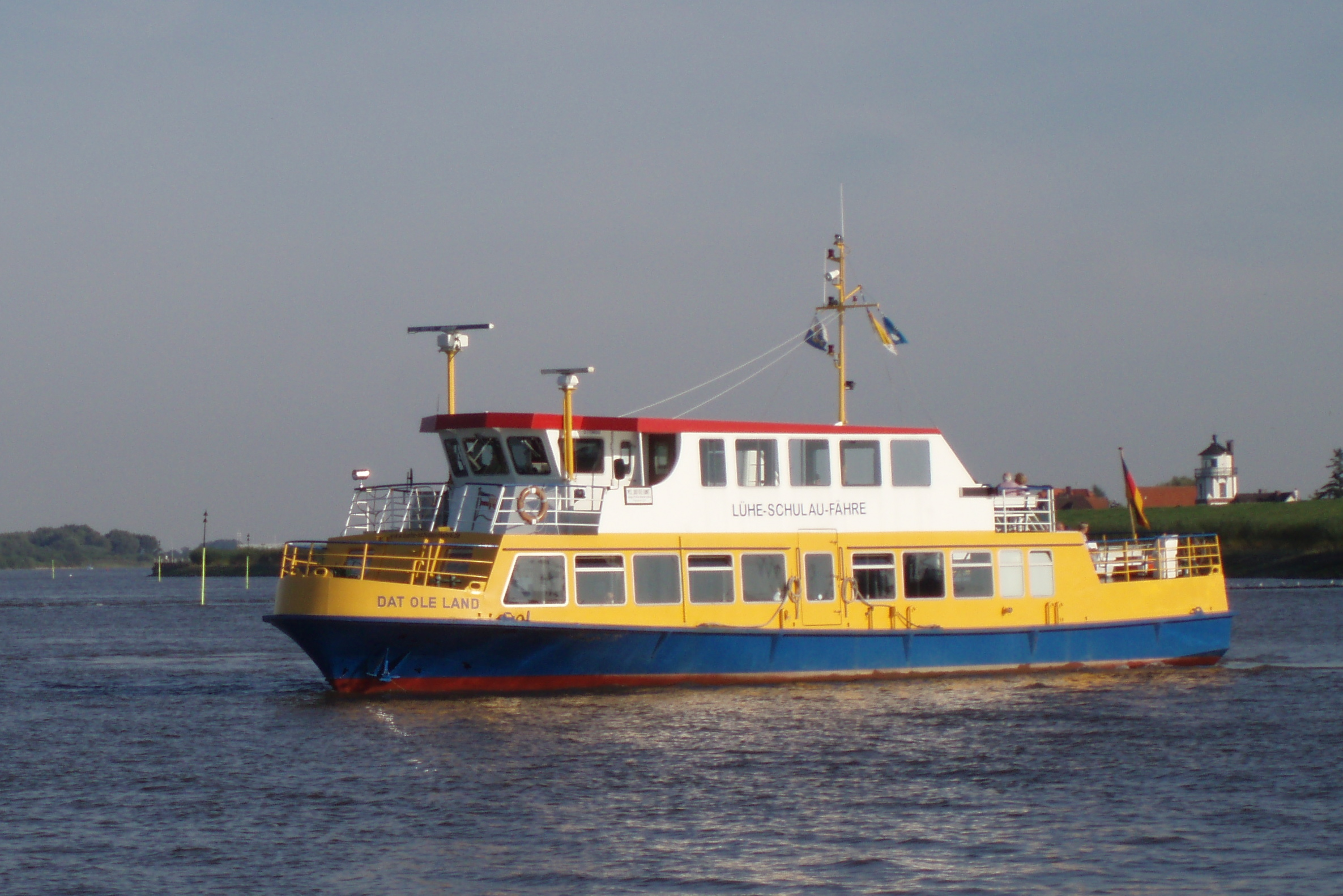
Lühe-Schulau ferry

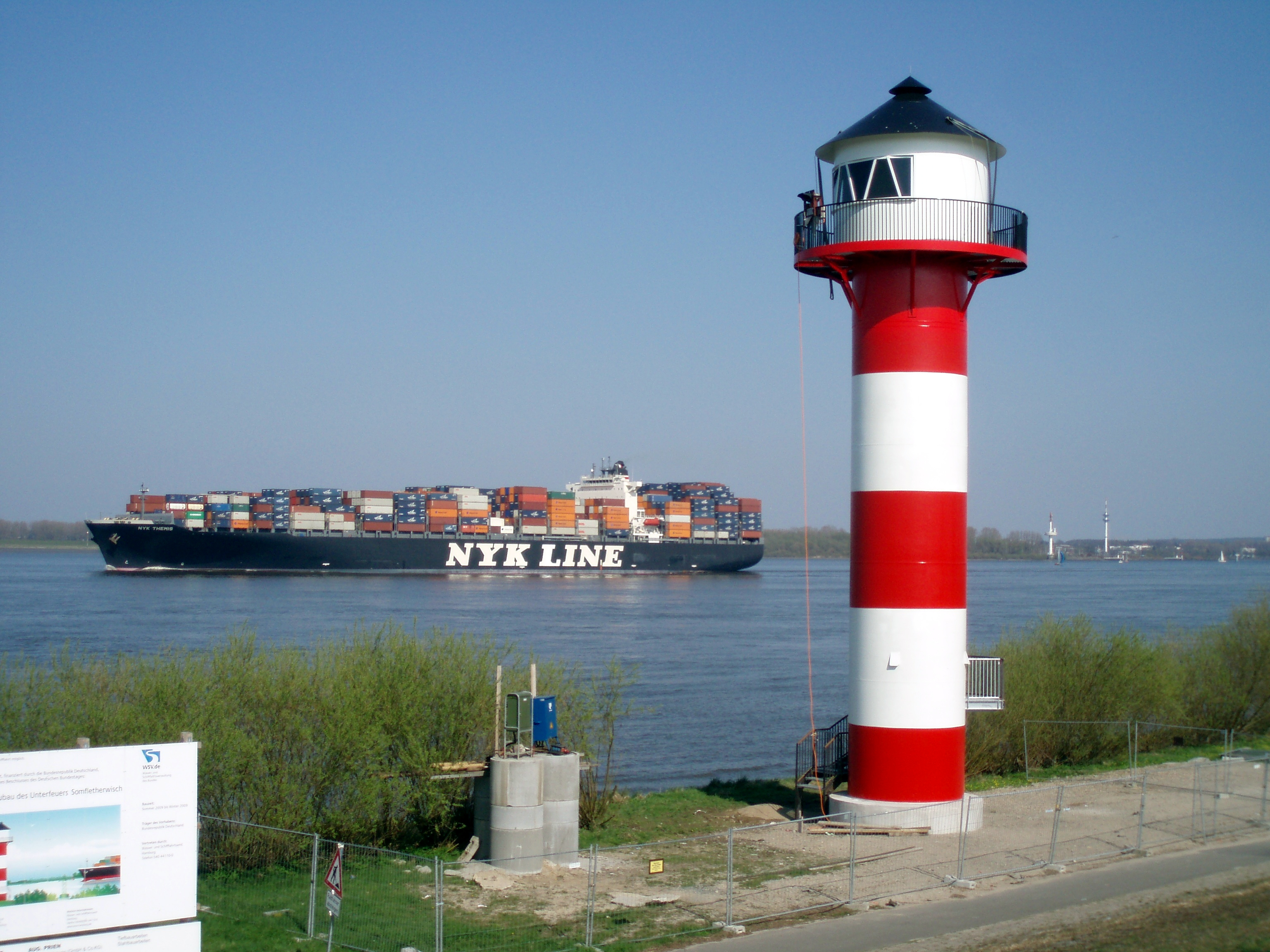
Somfletherwisch lighthouse
