= Hollern-Twielenfleth =

- Municipality
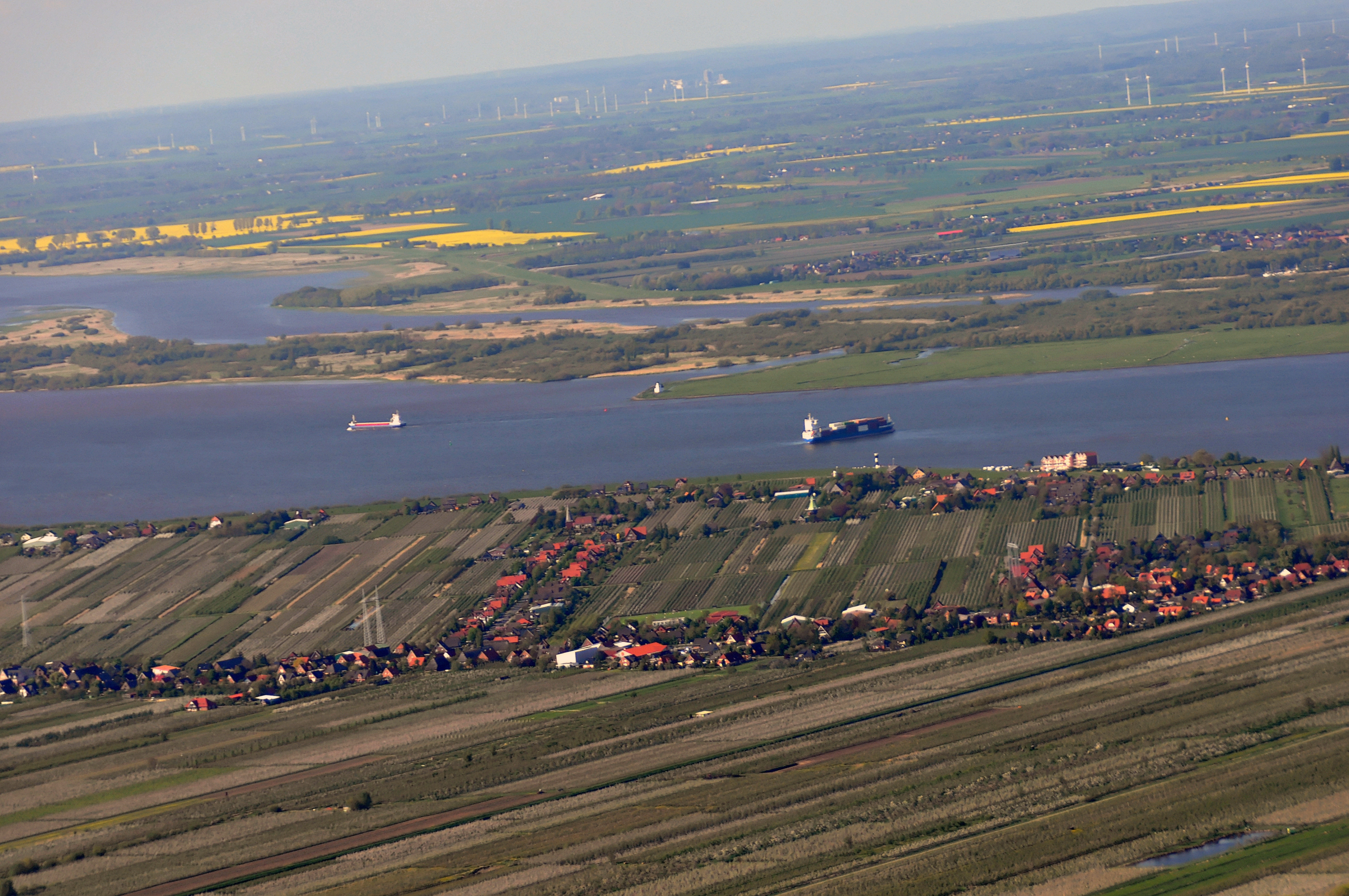
- Aerial view

- Coat of arms

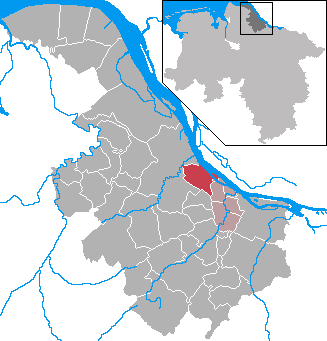
- Location of Hollern-Twielenfleth within Stade district
- Interactive map of Hollern-Twielenfleth
- Location within Germany Location within Lower Saxony
- Coordinates: 53°36′N 9°32′E
- Country: Germany
- State: Lower Saxony
- District: Stade
- Municipal assoc.: Lühe
- Subdivisions: 3

Government
  - Mayor: Timo Gerke

Area
  - Total: 20.46 km^{2} (7.90 sq mi)
- Elevation: 0–2 m (0.0–6.6 ft)

Population (2025-12-31)
  - Total: 3,284
  - Density: 160.5/km^{2} (415.7/sq mi)
- Time zone: UTC+01:00 (CET)
  - Summer (DST): UTC+02:00 (CEST)
- Postal codes: 21723
- Dialling codes: 04141
- Vehicle registration: STD
- Website: www.luehe-online.de

Hollern-Twielenfleth is a municipality in the district of Stade, Lower Saxony, Germany.

== History ==
In the year 1059 the district Twielenfleth was founded. It then belonged to the Prince-Archbishopric of Bremen. In 1648 the Prince-Archbishopric was transformed into the Duchy of Bremen, which was first ruled in personal union by the Swedish and from 1715 on by the Hanoverian Crown. In 1807 the ephemeric Kingdom of Westphalia annexed the Duchy, before France annexed it in 1810. In 1813 the Duchy was restored to the Electorate of Hanover, which - after its upgrade to the Kingdom of Hanover in 1814 - incorporated the duchy in a real union and the ducal territory, including Hollern and Twielenfleth, became part of the Stade Region, established in 1823. Since 1976 the township Twielenfleth exists, which advocates to keep the town's name.

== Geography ==
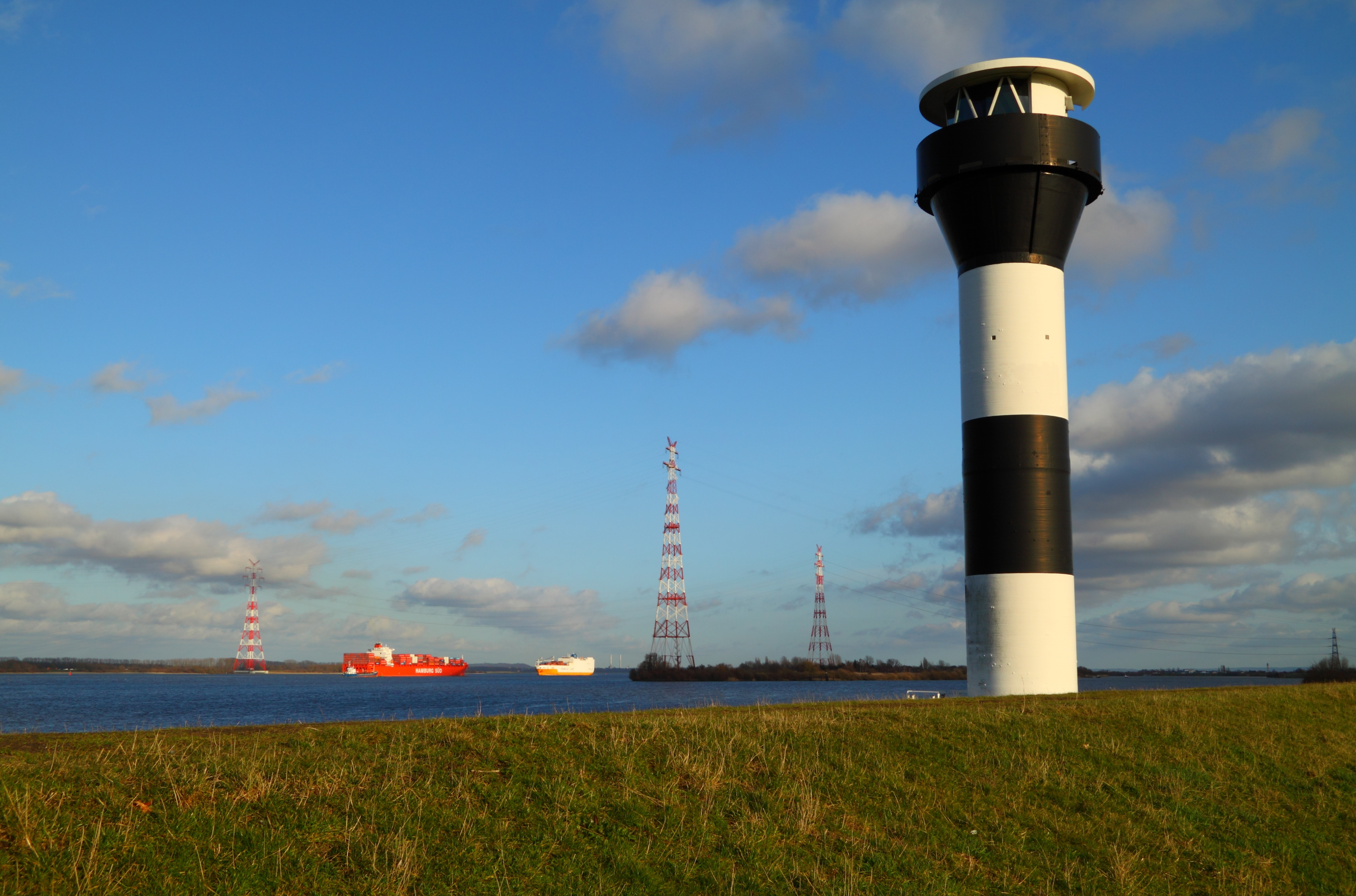
View of the Elbe in Hollern-Twielenfleth. The pylons on Lühesand belong to the Elbe crossing power lines.

The community is located in Altes Land (English: Old Land), the largest fruit orchard in Europe, directly by the Lower Elbe river (German: Unterelbe) between Stade and Hamburg. Besides the two districts Hollern and Twielenfleth there is Bassenfleth as the third one. The northwesterly two thirds of the Elbe island Lühesand forms part of the municipal area.

== Politics ==
District Director: Tim Siol

District Council (Gemeinderat): The district council, elected on 10 September 2006, includes:

- CDU 8 seats
- SPD 3 seats
- FWG 4 seats

(update: 10 September 2006)

== Culture and Sights ==
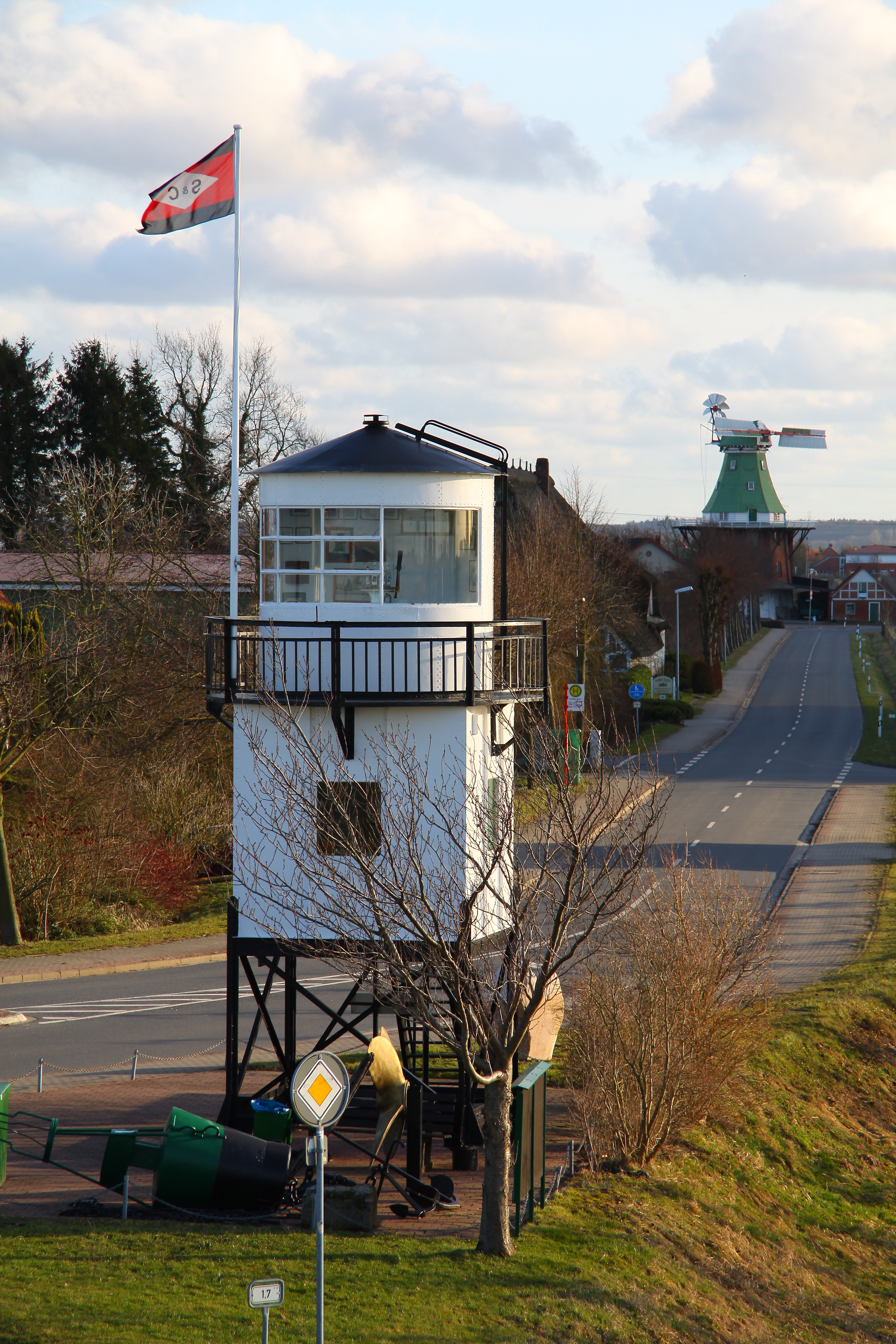
Old lighthouse

- Twielenfleth Mill „Venti Amica“ (lat. Friend of the Wind)
- Twielenfleth St.-Marien-Church
- Hollern St.-Mauritius-Church with pipe organ von Arp Schnitger (1690)
- old Twielenfleth lighthouse

== Traffic ==
In the community Hollern-Twielenfleth you can travel with several buses. The main bus line is 2357, which covers the following areas: Stade - Hollern-Twielenfleth - Steinkirchen - Jork - Hamburg-Cranz. All the bus lines are connected to the public transportation network of Hamburg (Hamburger Verkehrsverbund).
