= Neuenkirchen, Stade =

Neuenkirchen
- Municipality
- Flag Coat of arms

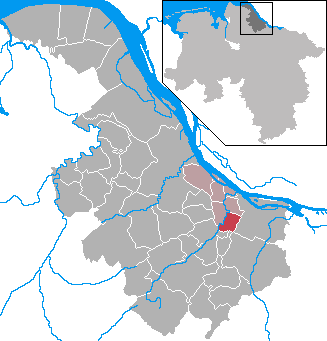
- Location of Neuenkirchen within Stade district
- Interactive map of Neuenkirchen
- Location within Germany Location within Lower Saxony
- Coordinates: 53°31′N 9°36′E
- Country: Germany
- State: Lower Saxony
- District: Stade
- Municipal assoc.: Lühe

Government
  - Mayor: Reinhard Meyer (CDU)

Area
  - Total: 8.04 km^{2} (3.10 sq mi)
- Elevation: 10 m (33 ft)

Population (2025-12-31)
  - Total: 838
  - Density: 104/km^{2} (270/sq mi)
- Time zone: UTC+01:00 (CET)
  - Summer (DST): UTC+02:00 (CEST)
- Postal codes: 21640
- Dialling codes: 04142
- Vehicle registration: STD
- Website: www.luehe-online.de

Neuenkirchen (German pronunciation: [ˈnɔʏənˌkɪʁçn̩]; Low German: Neekark) is a municipality in the Altes Land area of the Stade district of Lower Saxony, Germany.

Neuenkirchen belonged - as to its government - to the Prince-Archbishopric of Bremen, established in 1180. In religious respect, however, Neuenkirchen formed part of the Roman Catholic Diocese of Verden until after 1566 its incumbent bishops lost papal recognition, except of a last Catholic bishop from 1630 to 1631, respectively. In 1648 the prince-archbishopric was transformed into the Duchy of Bremen, which was first ruled in personal union by the Swedish – interrupted by a Danish occupation (1712–1715) – and from 1715 on by the Hanoverian Crown. In 1807 the ephemeric Kingdom of Westphalia annexed the duchy, before France annexed it in 1810. In 1813 the duchy was restored to the Electorate of Hanover, which – after its upgrade to the Kingdom of Hanover in 1814 – incorporated the duchy in a real union and the ducal territory, including Neuenkirchen, became part of the Stade Region, established in 1823.

== Notable people ==
- Heinrich Hellwege (1908-1991), German politician
