= Grünendeich =

- Municipality
- Coat of arms

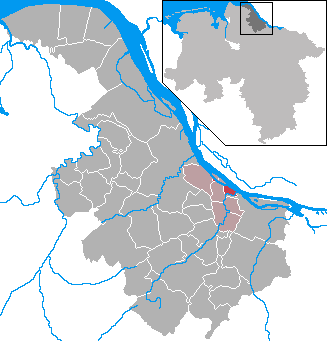
- Location of Grünendeich within Stade district
- Interactive map of Grünendeich
- Location within Germany Location within Lower Saxony
- Coordinates: 53°34′N 9°37′E
- Country: Germany
- State: Lower Saxony
- District: Stade
- Municipal assoc.: Lühe

Government
  - Mayor: Inge Massow-Oltermann (FW)

Area
  - Total: 3.92 km^{2} (1.51 sq mi)
- Elevation: 0–2 m (0.0–6.6 ft)

Population (2025-12-31)
  - Total: 1,750
  - Density: 446/km^{2} (1,160/sq mi)
- Time zone: UTC+01:00 (CET)
  - Summer (DST): UTC+02:00 (CEST)
- Postal codes: 21720
- Dialling codes: 04142, 04141
- Vehicle registration: STD
- Website: www.luehe.de

Grünendeich (German pronunciation: [ˈɡʁyːnəndaɪç]; Low German: Greundiek) is a municipality in the district of Stade, Lower Saxony, Germany.

It belonged to the Prince-Archbishopric of Bremen. In 1648 the Prince-Archbishopric was transformed into the Duchy of Bremen, which was first ruled in personal union by the Swedish and from 1715 on by the Hanoverian Crown. In 1823 the Duchy was abolished and its territory became part of the Stade Region.

== History ==
=== Place name ===
An old name of Grünendeich is Gronendike, which was used in the 15th and 16th century. It is believed that this name comes from "am grönen dīke" which is Low German for "at the green levee".

== Politics ==
=== Municipality council ===
As of February 2020, the council is composed of:

- Christian Democratic Union of Germany (CDU): 5 seats
- Social Democratic Party of Germany (SPD): 2 seats
- Free voter's community (FWG): 2 seats
- Alliance 90/The Greens (Grüne): 1 seat

=== Mayor/Mayoress ===
The Mayoress of Grünendeich is Inge Massow-Oltermann (FWG) since 2016. The deputy mayor is Gerd Dehmel (CDU).

=== Coat of arms ===
The coat of arms of Grünendeich consists of a shield parted per fess into silver and green. The upper, silver half is displaying a red-and-white-striped lighthouse with the gold, red-edged beacons reaching to the sides of the shield. The bottom, green half is displaying two silver roses, representing the local fruit orchards.

== Economy and infrastructure ==
=== Public transport ===
The Fähranleger Lühe, a ferry pier, is located in Grünendeich. From there, the ferry line Lühe-Schulau runs across the Elbe to Wedel in Schleswig-Holstein. This ferry is not part of the HVV, the public transport association of Hamburg.

Furthermore, three bus lines run by the KVG Stade stop in Grünendeich. These are:

- 2357 Stade – Hollern-Twielenfleth – Steinkirchen – Jork – Hamburg-Cranz
- 2030 Buxtehude – Dammhausen – Jork – Borstel – Steinkirchen
- 2033 Grünendeich – Steinkirchen – Horneburg

These are part of the HVV and thus can be made use of with a regular ticket.

Additionally, some school bus and company bus lines operate in Grünendeich.

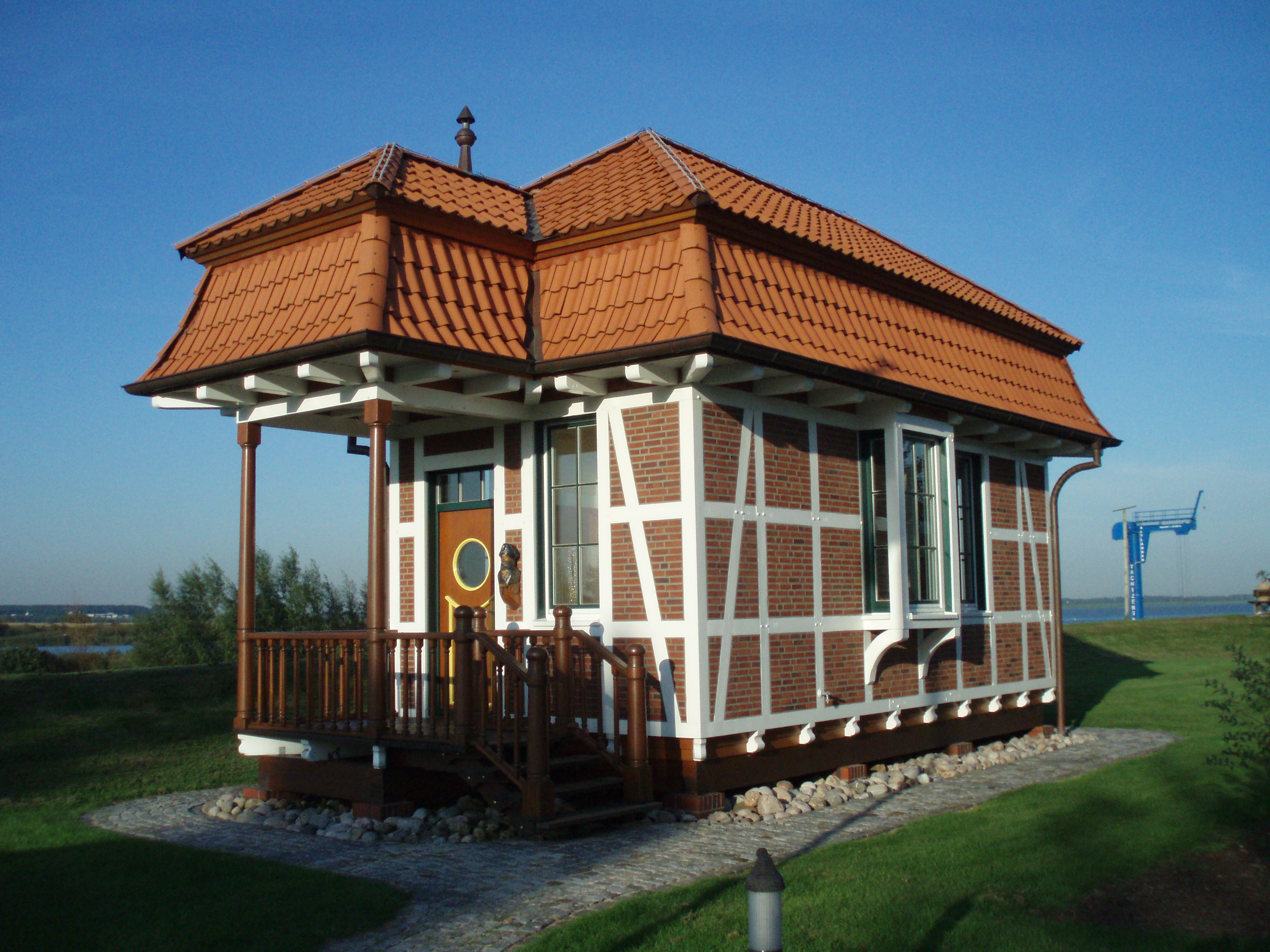
Historic Aumühle signal box near Wetterndorf

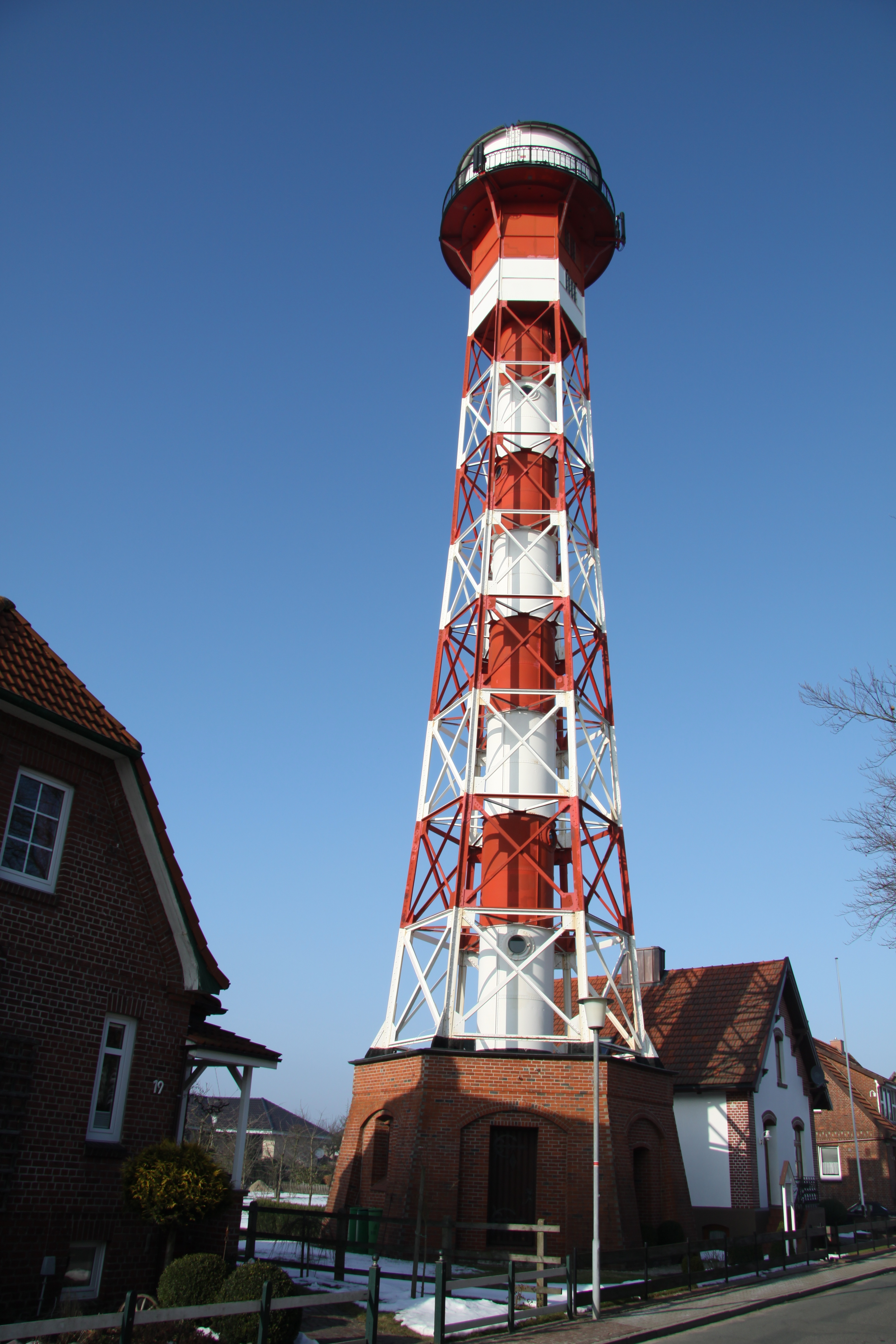
Grünendeich lighthouse

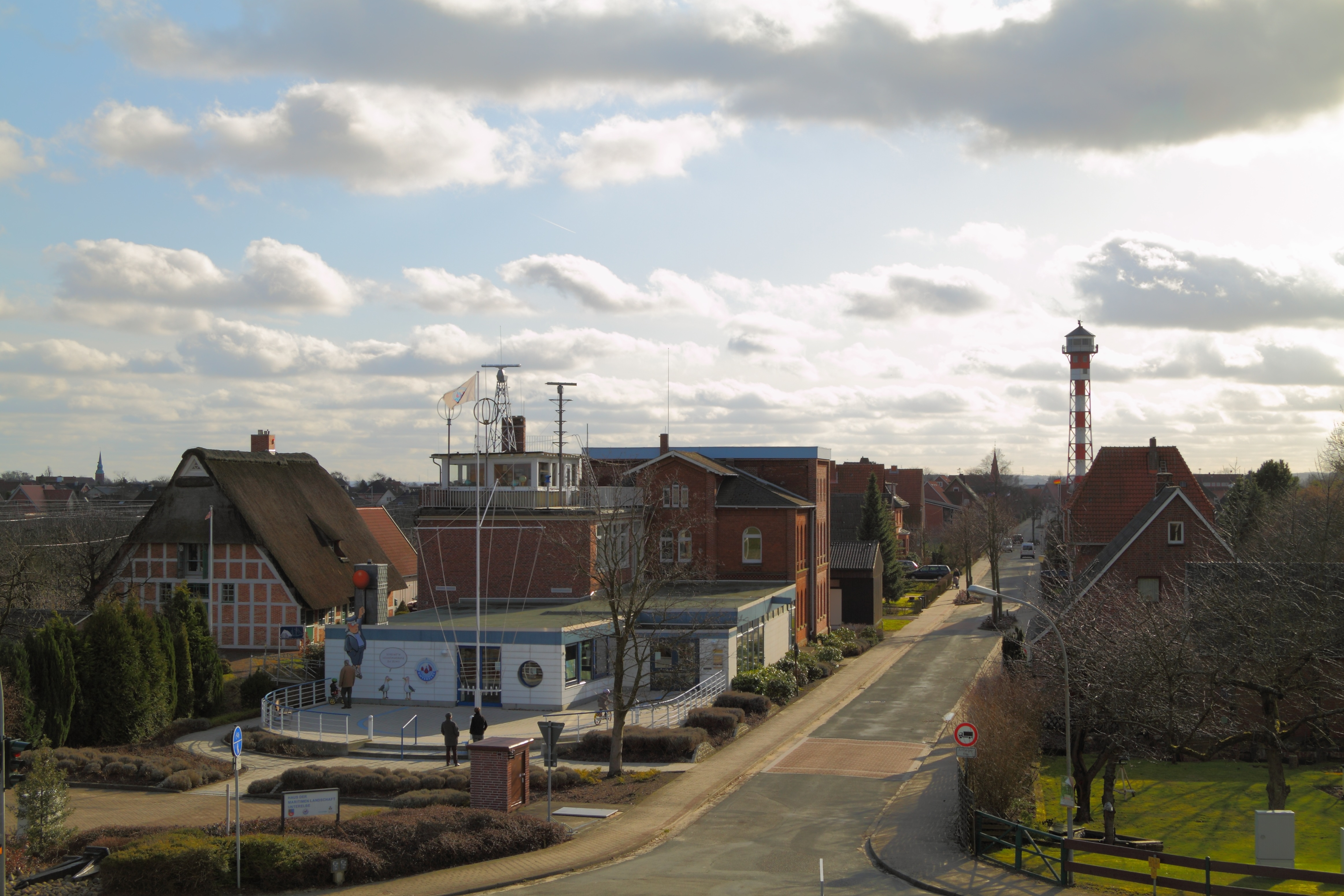
Maritime museum

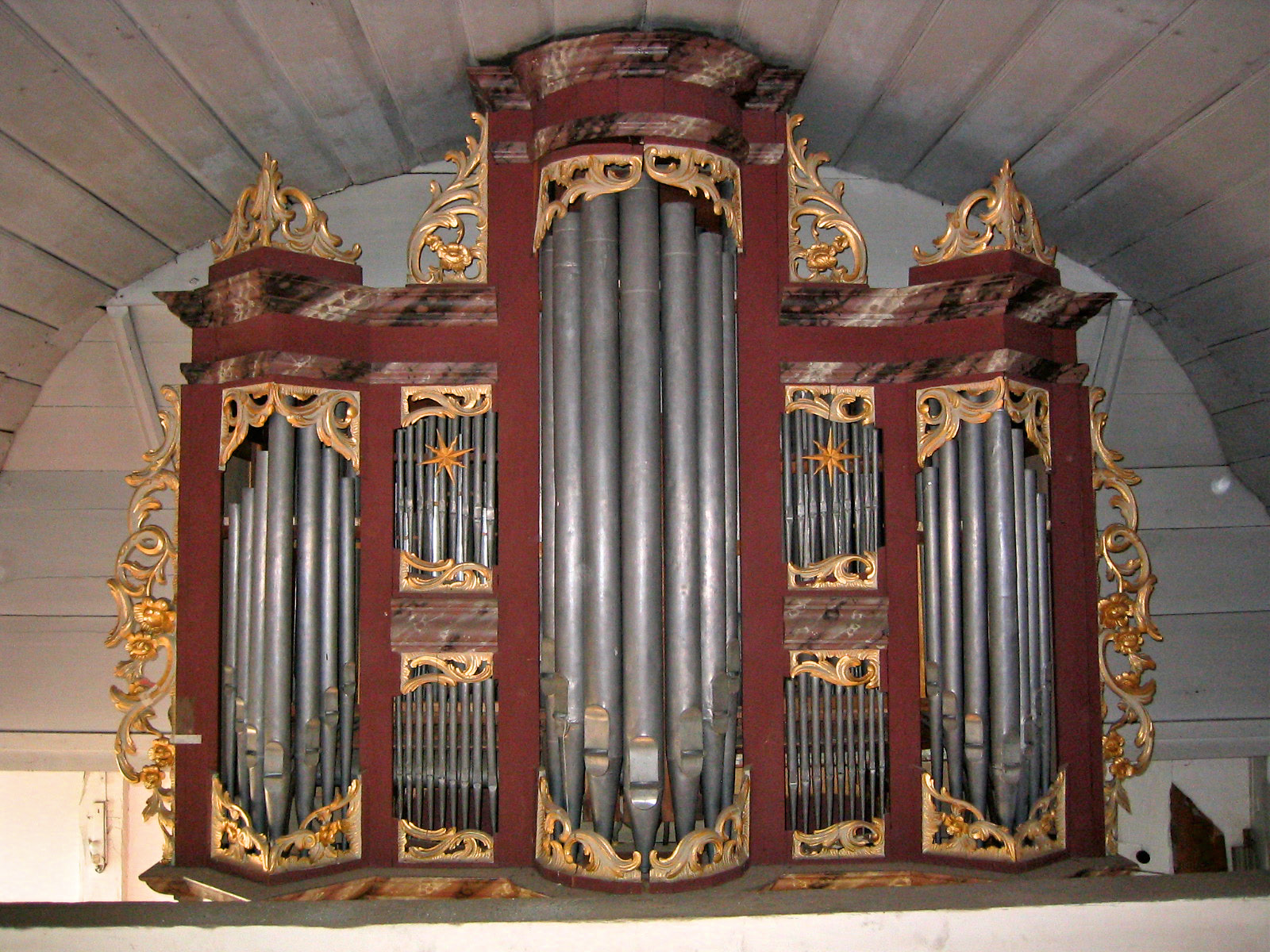
Pipe organ in the Grünendeich Lutheran church

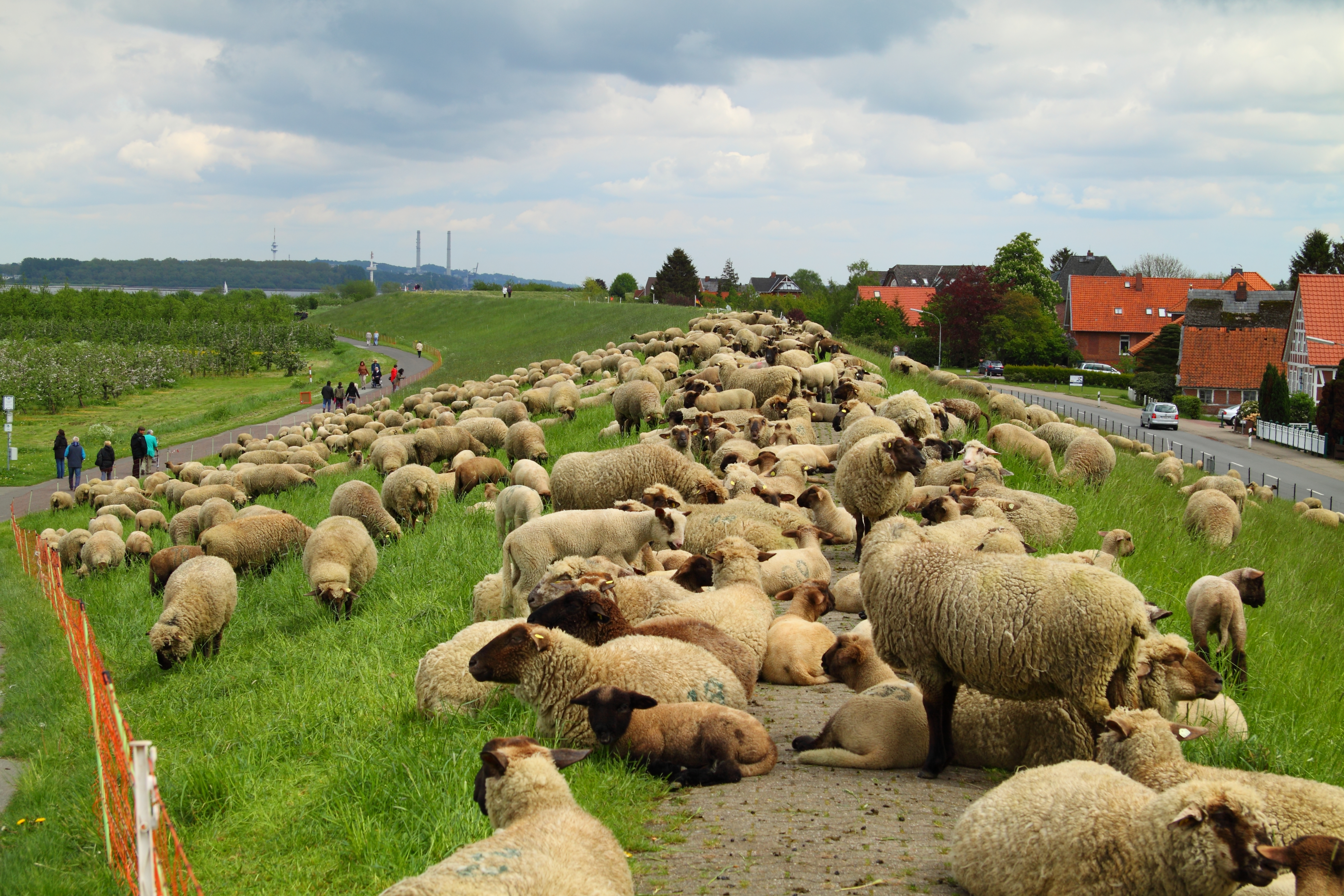
Sheep grazing on the Grünendeich Elbe levee

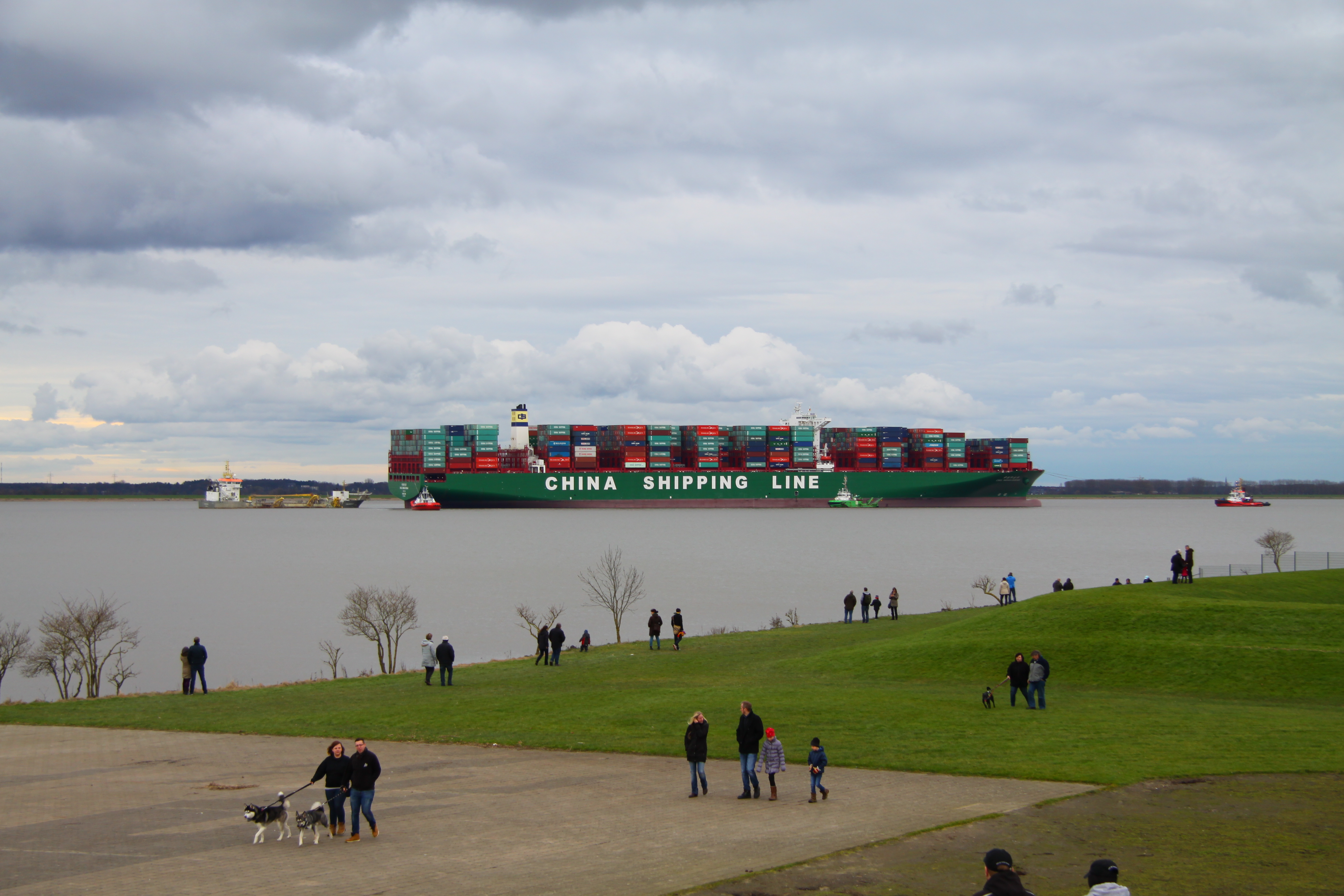
CSCL Indian Ocean after running aground near Grünendeich in early February 2016
