= Guderhandviertel =

- Municipality
- Flag Coat of arms

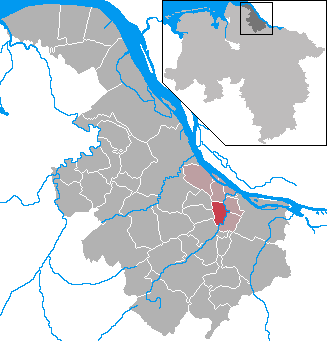
- Location of Guderhandviertel within Stade district
- Interactive map of Guderhandviertel
- Location within Germany Location within Lower Saxony
- Coordinates: 53°33′N 9°37′E
- Country: Germany
- State: Lower Saxony
- District: Stade
- Municipal assoc.: Lühe

Government
  - Mayor: Hans Gosch (CDU)

Area
  - Total: 8.94 km^{2} (3.45 sq mi)
- Elevation: 0–2 m (0.0–6.6 ft)

Population (2025-12-31)
  - Total: 1,120
  - Density: 125/km^{2} (324/sq mi)
- Time zone: UTC+01:00 (CET)
  - Summer (DST): UTC+02:00 (CEST)
- Postal codes: 21720
- Dialling codes: 04142, 04163
- Vehicle registration: STD
- Website: www.luehe-online.de

Guderhandviertel (German pronunciation: [ˈɡuːdɐhantˌfɪʁtl̩]; Low German: Gauderhandviddel) is a municipality in the district of Stade, Lower Saxony, Germany.

It belonged to the Prince-Archbishopric of Bremen. In 1648 the Prince-Archbishopric was transformed into the Duchy of Bremen, which was first ruled in personal union by the Swedish and from 1715 on by the Hanoverian Crown. In 1823 the Duchy was abolished and its territory became part of the Stade Region.
