= Altes Land =

Area between Lower Saxony and Hamburg

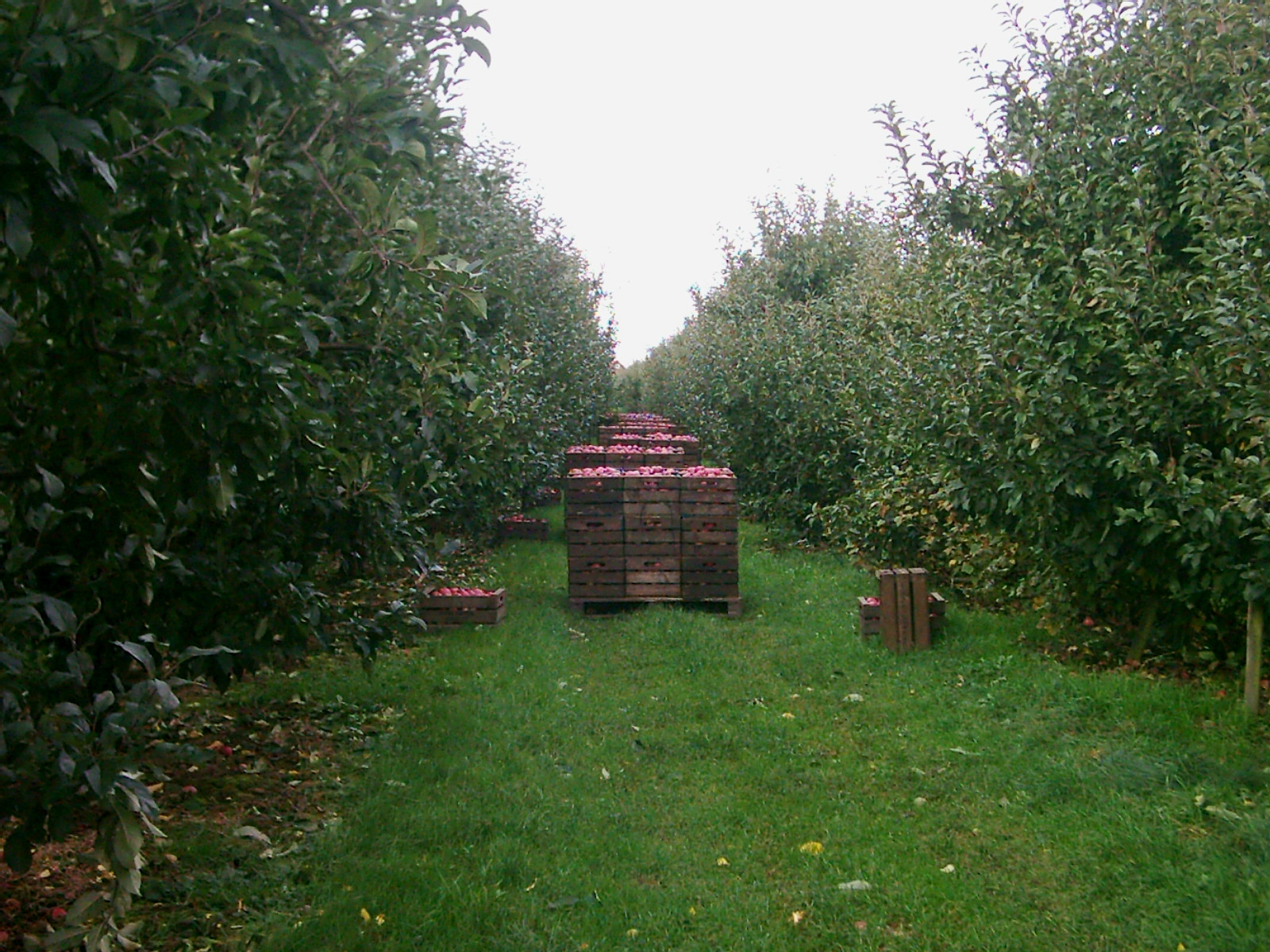
Harvest of apples in Rübke

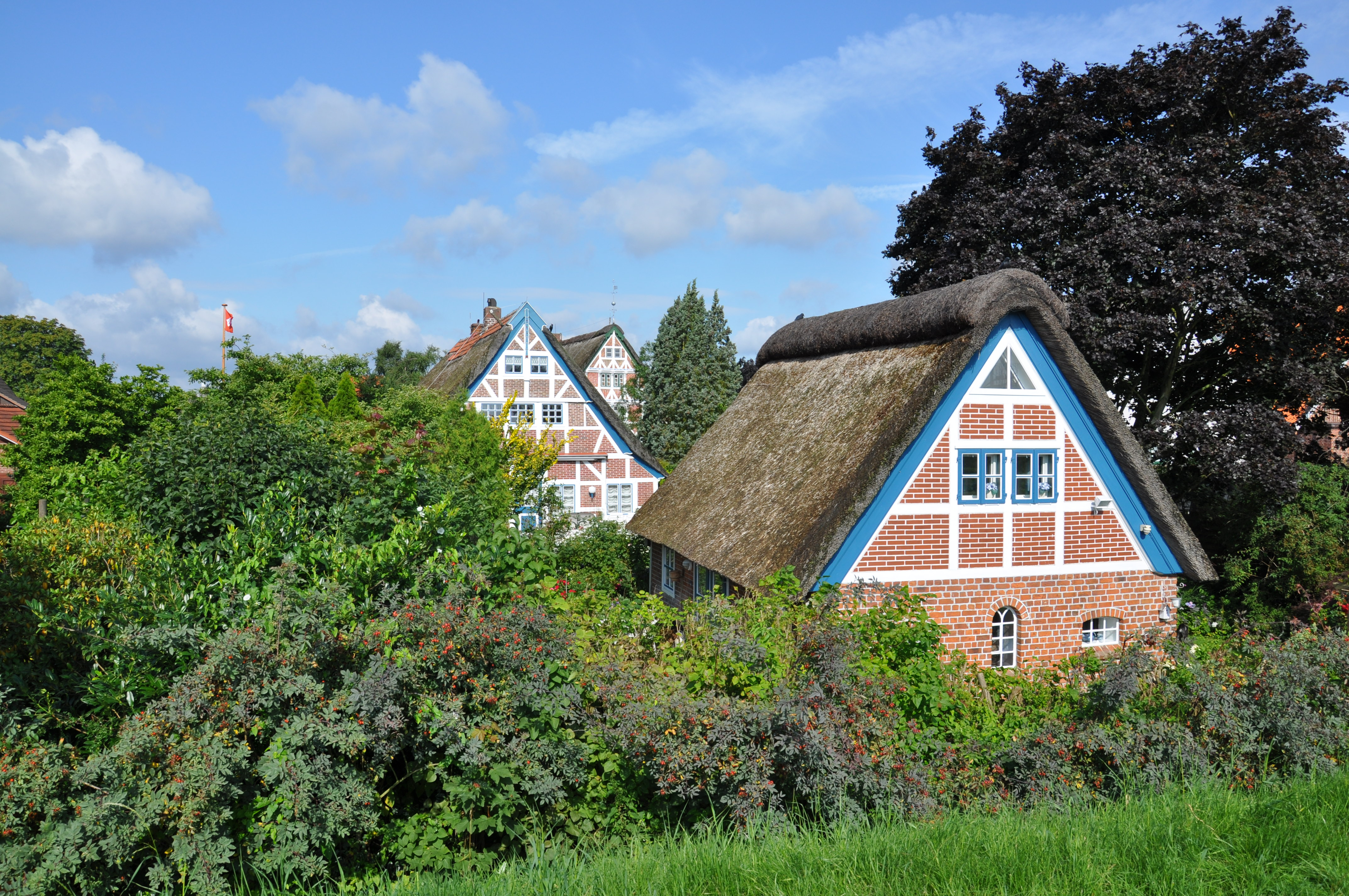
Altes Land: The village Steinkirchen

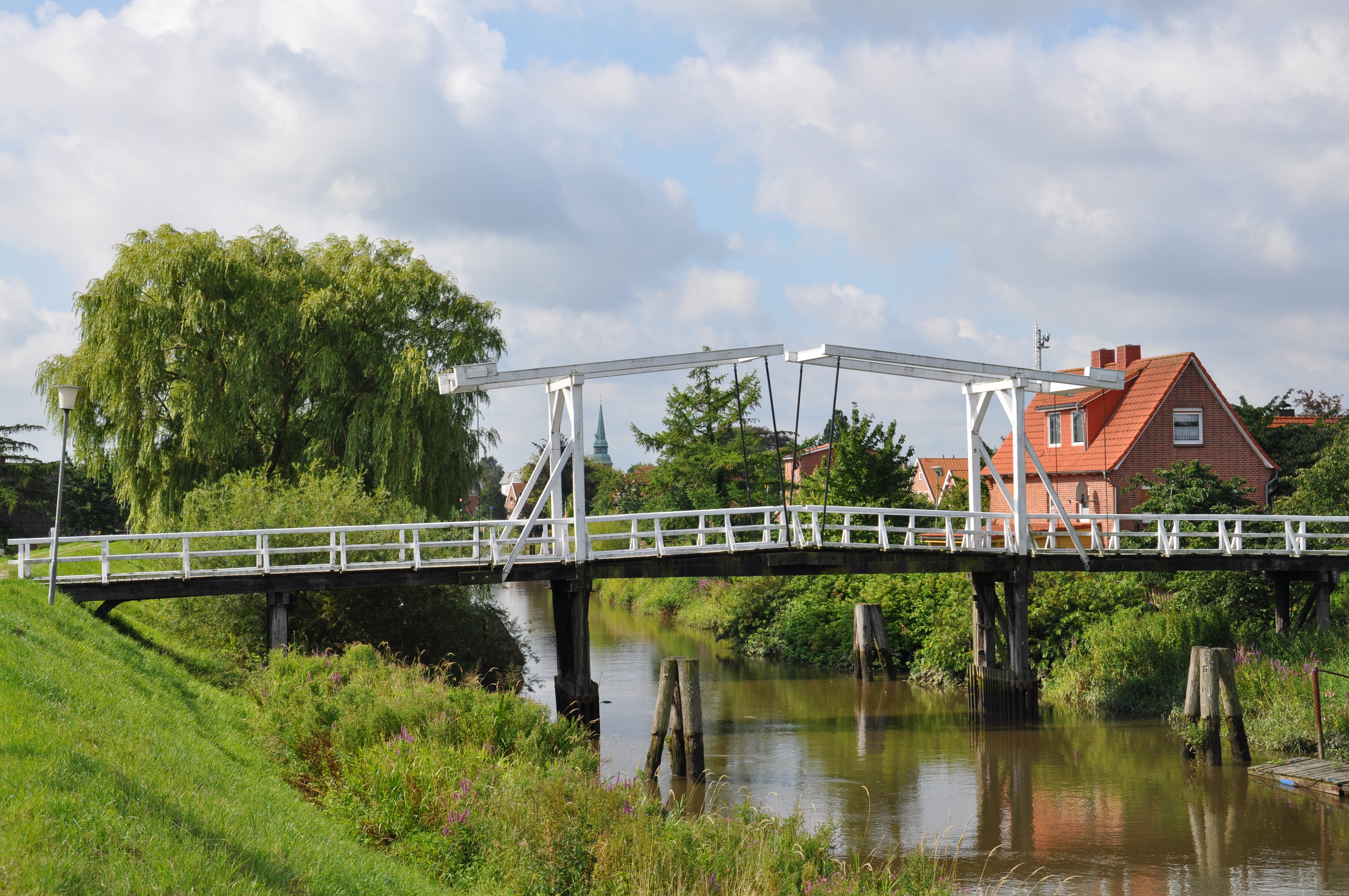
The "Hogendiekbrücke" in Steinkirchen

Altes Land (German pronunciation: [ˈaltəs ˈlant]) is an area of reclaimed marshland straddling parts of Lower Saxony and Hamburg. The region is situated downstream from Hamburg on the southwestern riverside of the Elbe around the towns of Stade, Buxtehude, Jork and the Samtgemeinde of Lühe. In Hamburg it includes the quarters of Neuenfelde, Cranz, Francop and Finkenwerder. Altes Land is one of the Elbe Marshes.

The region – the biggest contiguous fruit-producing region in North Europe – extends over 143 km^{2} (55 sq mi). 76.8% of the trees are apples, 12.7% are cherries. The areas closest to the Elbe are those with the highest population. They include the most fertile marshlands; towards the geest the area connects to fens.

The fertile land led to the development of a culture dominated by farming. The villages are known as Marschhufendörfer, a special kind of village where the farmyards are set along a street with the land directly behind them. A characteristic feature is the richly decorated half-timbered farmhouses with their elaborate gateways.

== Etymology ==
The region's official standard German name is Altes Land, which means "old country". However, Altes Land is a mistranslation of the original Low Saxon Olland, which originally had nothing to do with "old": It stems from the term Holland - itself derived from Holtland meaning "Wooded Land". This is a reference to the area's original reclamation and colonisation by Dutch settlers. The first colonisation agreement goes back to 1113 and was drawn up during the time of Archbishop Friedrich I of Bremen. One of the municipalities of the Altes Land is Hollern, a name which comes from Holländer (German for the Dutch). However, the mistranslation of Olland as Altes Land has now come full circle, since most Low Saxon speakers today refer to the region as dat Ole Land (literally “the old land”). There also is an eponymous periodical.

== Geography and history ==
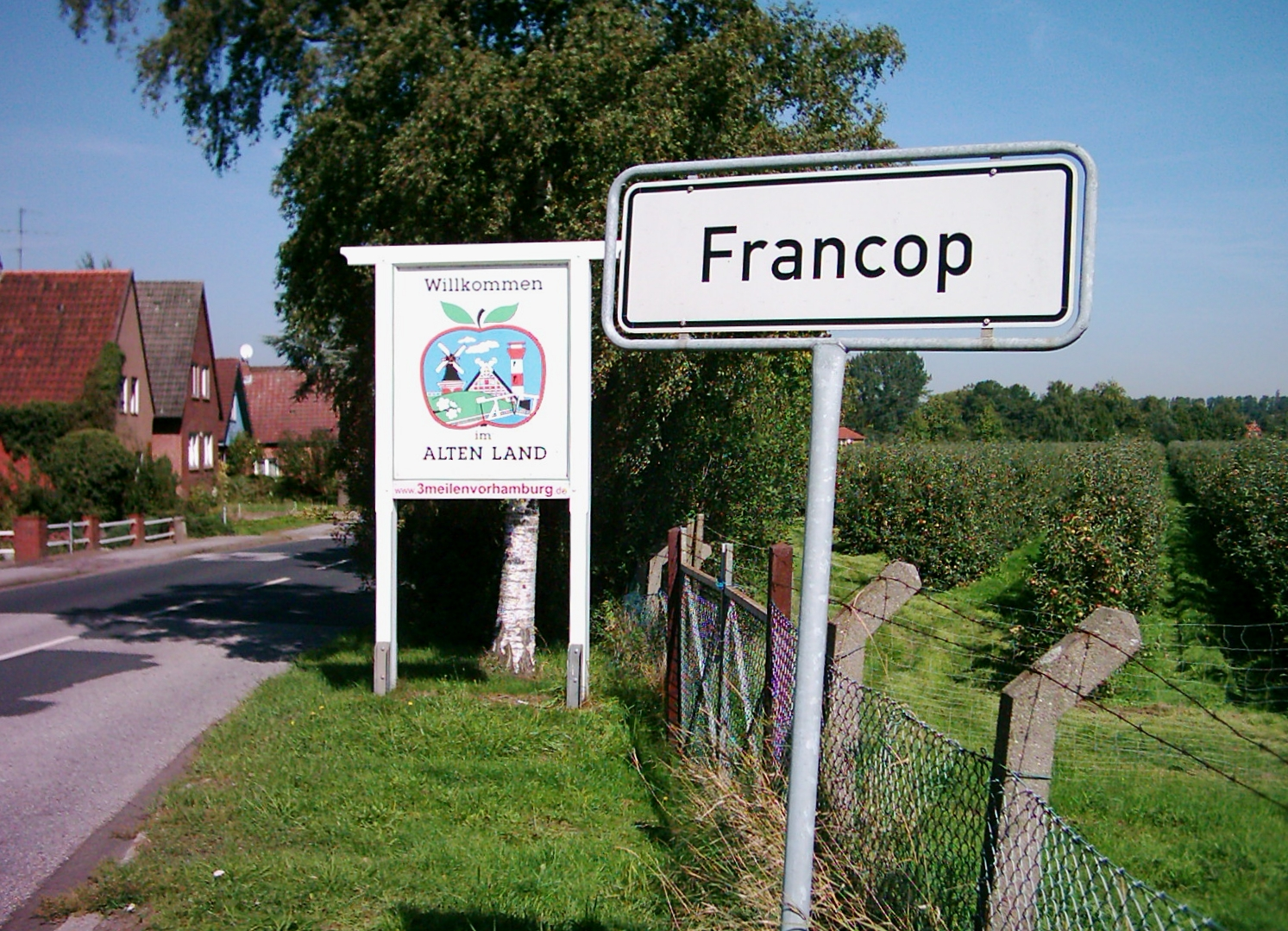
Welcome sign in Hamburg's Francop quarter.

The Altes Land is divided into three "miles" (German Meilen); the first, second and third miles. These miles are zones along the banks of the Lower Elbe river. The first mile, between the rivers Schwinge and Lühe, was first dyked and then settled in around 1140. The second mile is the area east of the first between the Lühe and the Este, an area which was dyked at the end of the 12th century. The third mile, called Terra Nova (new land), between the Este and the Elbe, was only dyked at the end of the 15th century when the area was especially hard-hit by storm tides.

As of 2008 tourism plays a major role in the local economy, particularly during the cherry blossom and apple blossom seasons. However, parts of the orchard plantations are slowly being displaced by residential developments. Many of these new homes are then sold or rented to commuters who work in nearby Hamburg.
