= Jork =

- Municipality
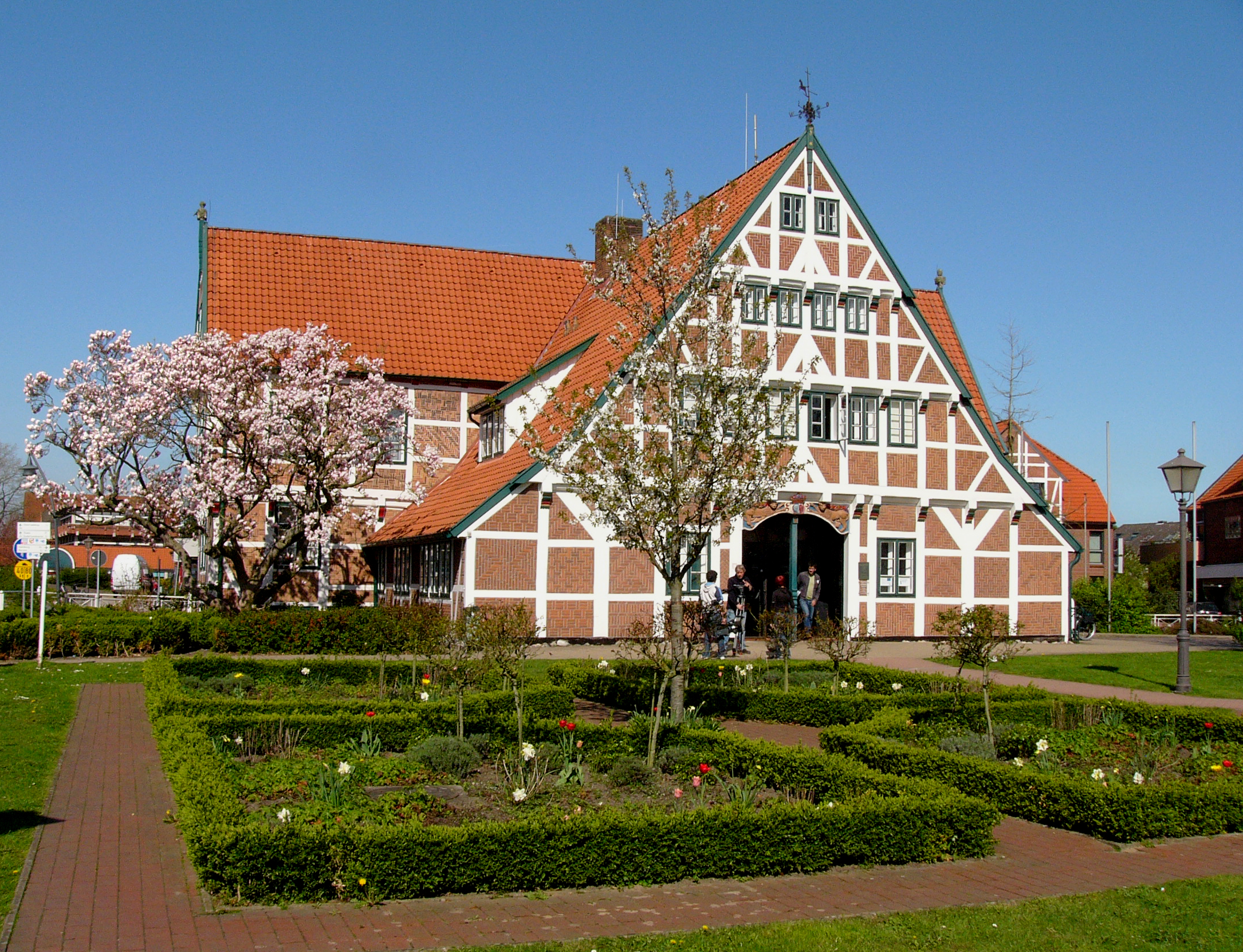
- Town hall

- Coat of arms

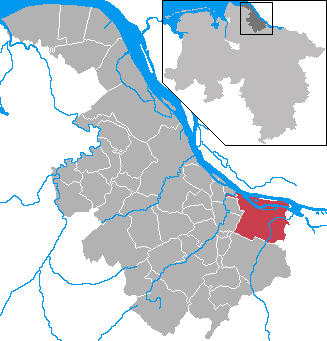
- Location of Jork within Stade district
- Interactive map of Jork
- Location within Germany Location within Lower Saxony
- Coordinates: 53°32′04″N 09°40′54″E
- Country: Germany
- State: Lower Saxony
- District: Stade
- Subdivisions: 7 districts

Government
  - Mayor (2019–24): Matthias Riel

Area
  - Total: 62.24 km^{2} (24.03 sq mi)
- Elevation: 4 m (13 ft)

Population (2025-12-31)
  - Total: 11,510
  - Density: 184.9/km^{2} (479.0/sq mi)
- Time zone: UTC+01:00 (CET)
  - Summer (DST): UTC+02:00 (CEST)
- Postal codes: 21635
- Dialling codes: 04162
- Vehicle registration: STD
- Website: www.jork.de

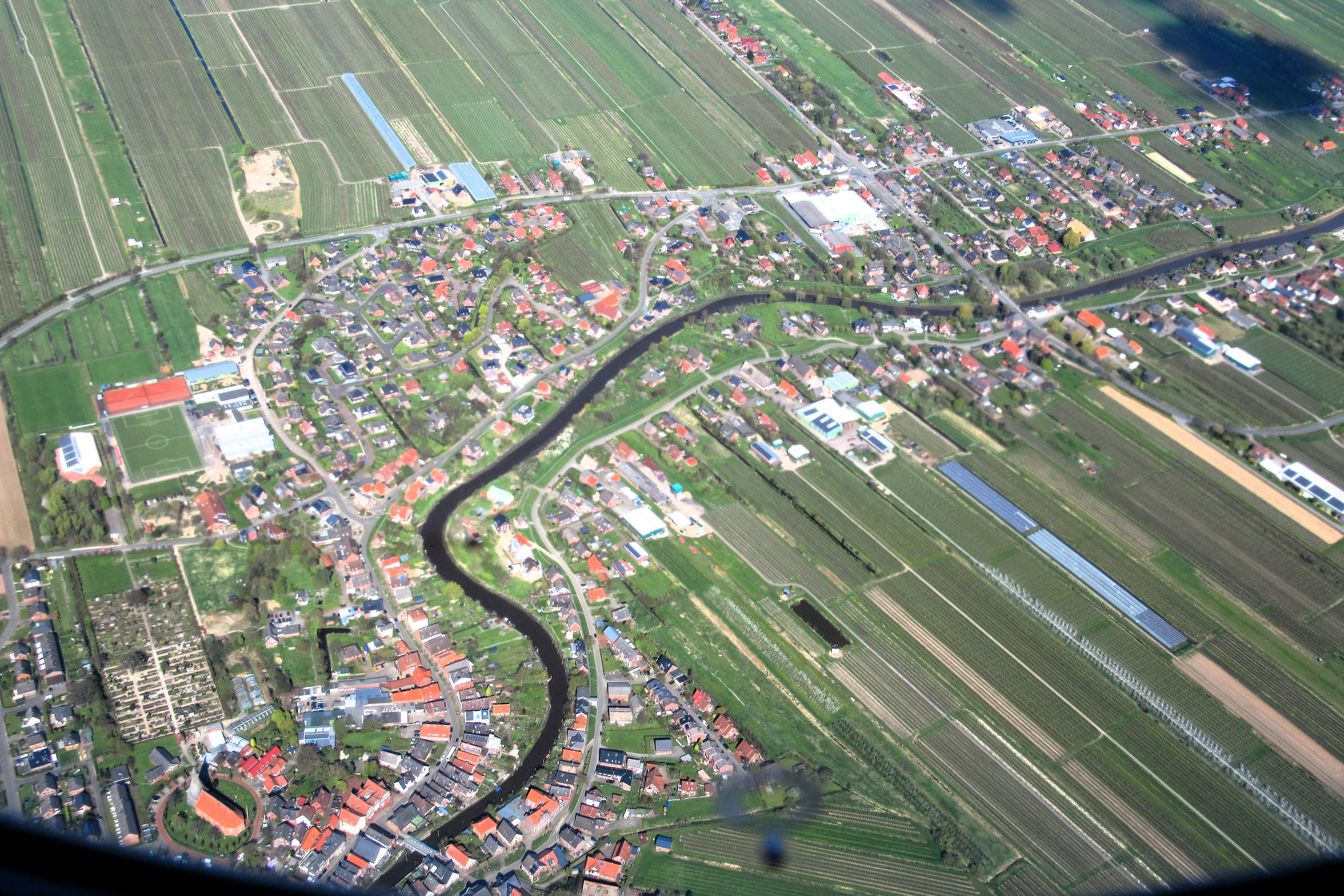
Jork, aerial view

Jork (German pronunciation: [jɔʁk]) is a municipality in the district of Stade, in Lower Saxony, in northern Germany, situated on the left bank of the Elbe, near Hamburg.

The town is the capital of the Altes Land, one of the biggest fruit growing areas in Europe, and is home to Jork Fruit Research Station.

== History ==
Jork was mentioned for the first time in a deed in 1221, then it belonged to the Prince-Archbishopric of Bremen in secular respect. As to religion Jork belonged to the Roman Catholic Diocese of Verden (till 1648). In 1648 the Prince-Archbishopric was transformed into the Duchy of Bremen, which was first ruled in personal union by Sweden and from 1715 on by the British and Hanoverian Crown. In 1807 the ephemeric Kingdom of Westphalia annexed the Duchy, before France annexed it in 1810. In 1813 the Duchy was restored to the Electorate of Hanover, which – after its upgrade to the Kingdom of Hanover in 1814 – incorporated the Duchy in a real union and the ducal territory, including Jork, became part of the Stade Region, established in 1823.

In 1866 the town was annexed by Kingdom of Prussia and in 1871 it became part of the newly established German Empire. From 1885 to 1932 Jork served as the capital of the Prussian District of Jork, comprising Altes Land, the city of Buxtehude and its today component Neuland, then still an independent municipality. The former district forms since a part of today's District of Stade.

Under Nazi Germany, it was the location of a forced labour subcamp of the Glasmoor youth detention centre in Norderstedt.

== Climate ==
Jork has an oceanic climate (Köppen: Cfb; Trewartha: Dolk).

Climate data for Jork, 1961–1990 normals, extremes 1951–1990
Month	Jan	Feb	Mar	Apr	May	Jun	Jul	Aug	Sep	Oct	Nov	Dec	Year
Record high °C (°F)	13.4 (56.1)	17.3 (63.1)	22.8 (73.0)	29.7 (85.5)	31.0 (87.8)	32.6 (90.7)	34.1 (93.4)	34.0 (93.2)	30.1 (86.2)	25.1 (77.2)	19.8 (67.6)	15.4 (59.7)	34.1 (93.4)
Mean maximum °C (°F)	8.7 (47.7)	9.8 (49.6)	14.9 (58.8)	20.7 (69.3)	25.5 (77.9)	28.9 (84.0)	29.3 (84.7)	29.4 (84.9)	24.8 (76.6)	20.3 (68.5)	14.1 (57.4)	10.7 (51.3)	30.8 (87.4)
Mean daily maximum °C (°F)	2.8 (37.0)	3.9 (39.0)	7.4 (45.3)	12.1 (53.8)	17.3 (63.1)	20.3 (68.5)	21.4 (70.5)	21.6 (70.9)	18.2 (64.8)	13.3 (55.9)	7.6 (45.7)	4.0 (39.2)	12.5 (54.5)
Daily mean °C (°F)	0.5 (32.9)	1.2 (34.2)	3.8 (38.8)	7.5 (45.5)	12.3 (54.1)	15.5 (59.9)	16.7 (62.1)	16.4 (61.5)	13.2 (55.8)	9.4 (48.9)	5.0 (41.0)	1.9 (35.4)	8.6 (47.5)
Mean daily minimum °C (°F)	−2.1 (28.2)	−1.7 (28.9)	0.5 (32.9)	3.0 (37.4)	6.9 (44.4)	9.9 (49.8)	11.7 (53.1)	11.3 (52.3)	8.8 (47.8)	5.8 (42.4)	2.3 (36.1)	−0.7 (30.7)	4.6 (40.3)
Mean minimum °C (°F)	−11.4 (11.5)	−9.8 (14.4)	−6.4 (20.5)	−2.8 (27.0)	0.4 (32.7)	3.7 (38.7)	6.1 (43.0)	5.6 (42.1)	2.8 (37.0)	−1.3 (29.7)	−5.4 (22.3)	−10.1 (13.8)	−15.1 (4.8)
Record low °C (°F)	−21.0 (−5.8)	−23.0 (−9.4)	−16.1 (3.0)	−7.7 (18.1)	−2.5 (27.5)	0.6 (33.1)	3.4 (38.1)	2.1 (35.8)	−0.7 (30.7)	−5.4 (22.3)	−14.5 (5.9)	−19.5 (−3.1)	−23.0 (−9.4)
Average precipitation mm (inches)	60.2 (2.37)	39.8 (1.57)	52.0 (2.05)	48.3 (1.90)	59.0 (2.32)	70.1 (2.76)	77.4 (3.05)	68.8 (2.71)	66.0 (2.60)	59.5 (2.34)	68.1 (2.68)	67.9 (2.67)	737.2 (29.02)
Average extreme snow depth cm (inches)	7.7 (3.0)	7.3 (2.9)	3.8 (1.5)	1.0 (0.4)	0 (0)	0 (0)	0 (0)	0 (0)	0 (0)	0 (0)	2.0 (0.8)	5.5 (2.2)	14.2 (5.6)
Average precipitation days (≥ 0.1 mm)	19.6	15.4	16.3	14.8	14.8	14.7	16.0	15.6	16.1	16.9	19.3	19.2	198.6
Average relative humidity (%)	87.0	83.6	80.5	76.2	73.4	75.5	78.3	79.4	83.5	86.1	86.9	87.9	81.5
Mean monthly sunshine hours	39.6	65.2	100.5	158.1	213.1	214.8	199.4	203.0	137.8	96.3	51.4	31.2	1,510.3
Source: Deutscher Wetterdienst/SKlima.de

== Division of the town ==
Jork consists of seven districts:

- Borstel
- Estebrügge
- Hove
- Jork
- Königreich
- Ladekop
- Moorende

== Gallery ==
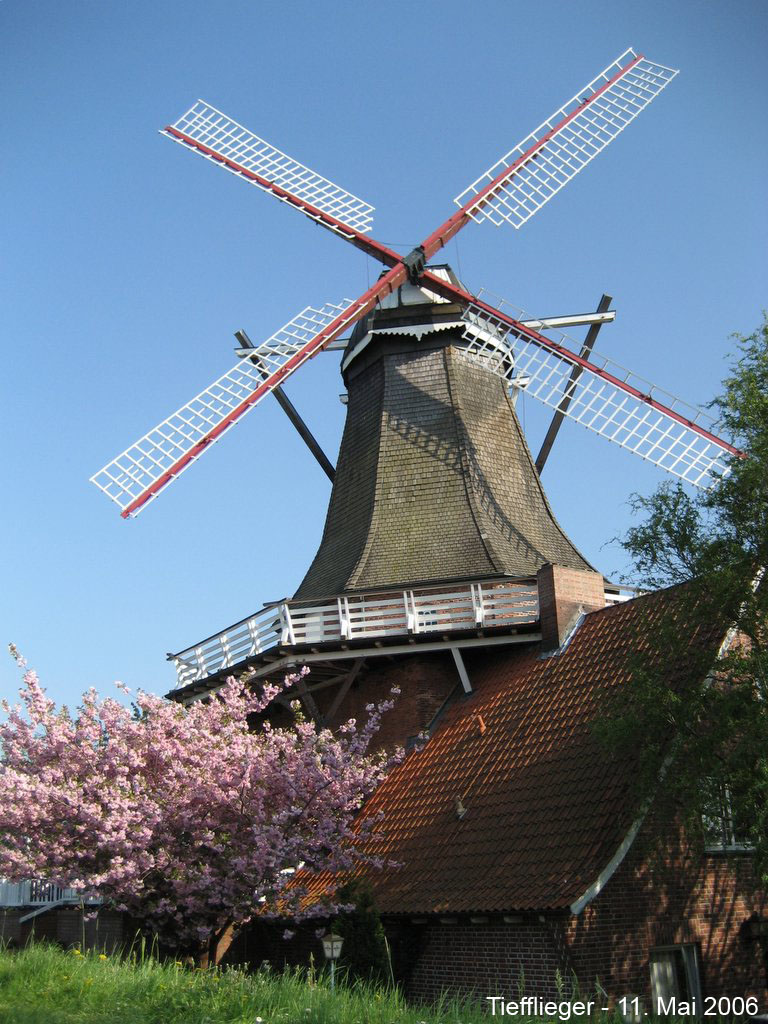
Borstel windmill

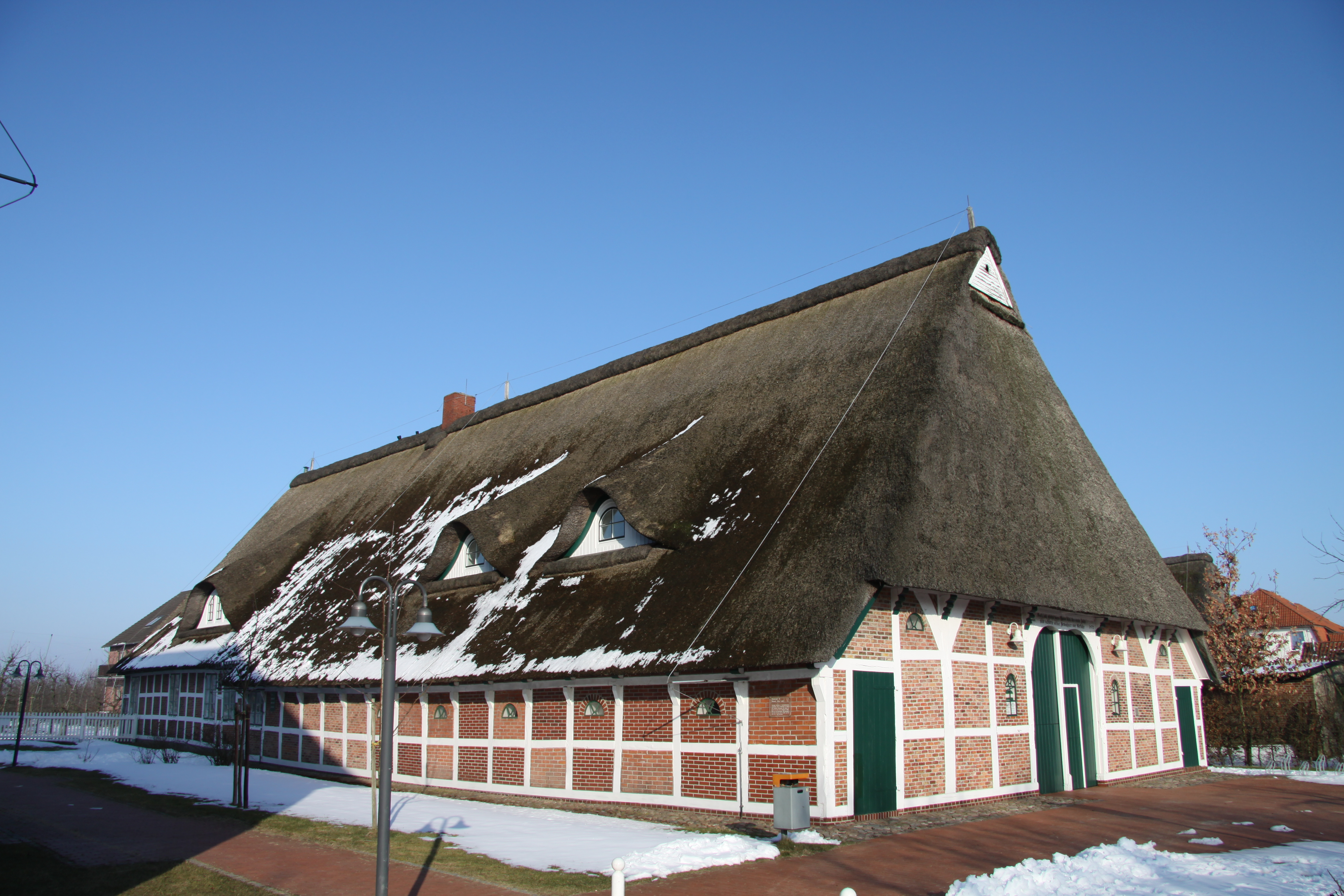
Museum Altes Land

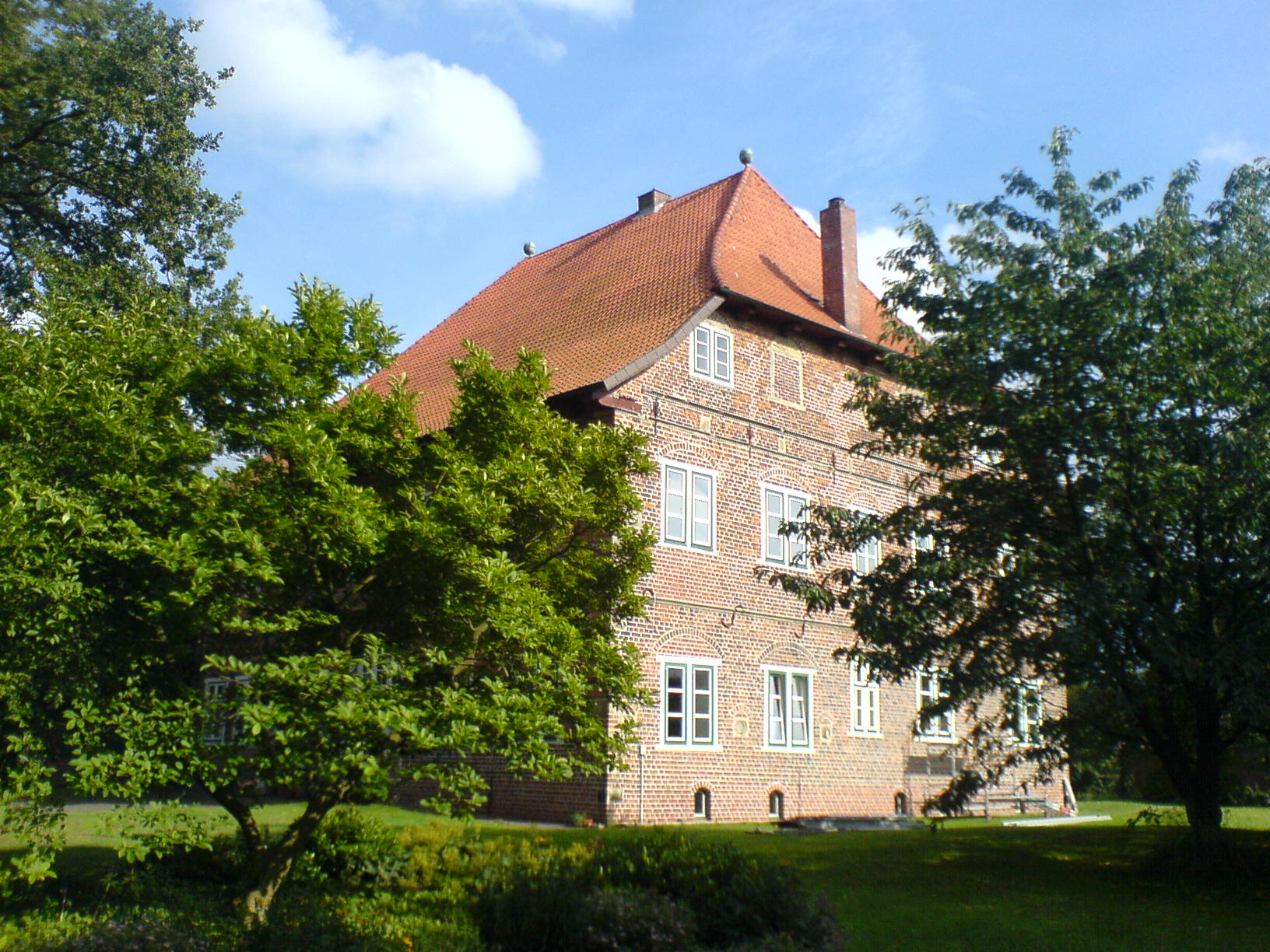
Esteburg castle

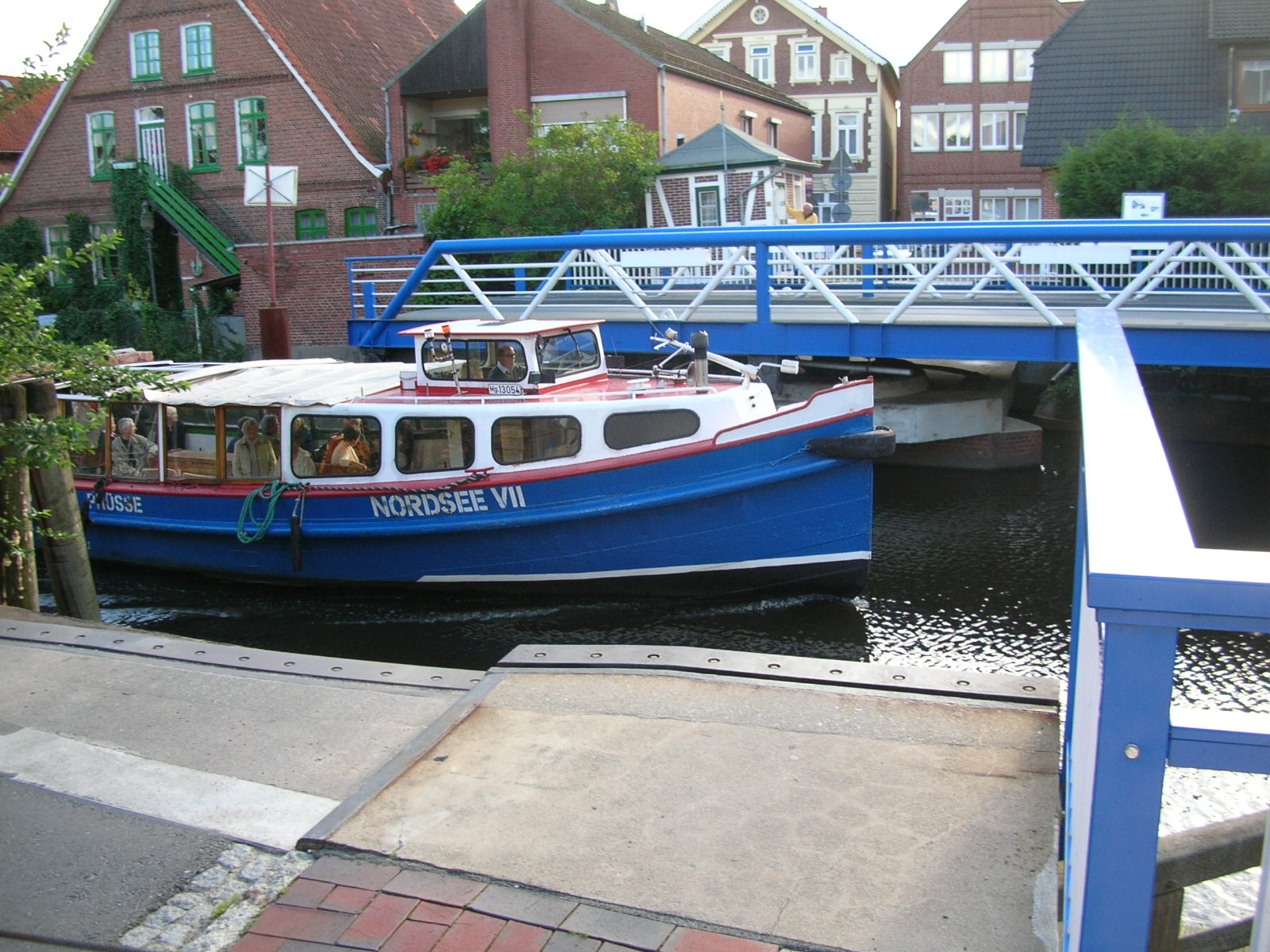
Launch "Nordsee VII" passing the swing bridge at Jork-Estebrügge
