= Jürgen Flimm =

German theatre and opera director (1941–2023)

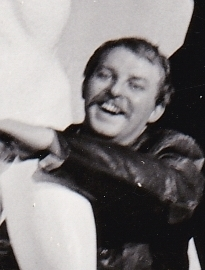
- Flimm in rehearsal, 1966
- Born: 17 July 1941; Gießen, Hesse, German Reich
- Died: 4 February 2023 (aged 81); Hamelwörden, Lower Saxony, Germany
- Occupations: Theatre director; theatre manager; academic teacher
- Organizations: Thalia Theater; University of Hamburg; Salzburg Festival; RuhrTriennale; Berlin State Opera
- Spouse(s): Inge Jansen (1969–?), Susanne Ottersbach (1990–2023)
- Awards: Order of Merit of the Federal Republic of Germany; Austrian Decoration for Science and Art

Jürgen Flimm (German pronunciation: [ˈjʏʁɡn̩ ˈflɪm]; 17 July 1941 – 4 February 2023) was a German theatre and opera director, theatre manager, and academic teacher. Flimm was first active in drama, and made the Thalia Theater in Hamburg one of the most successful German theatres when he managed it from 1985 to 2000. He was general manager of the Salzburg Festival and RuhrTriennale festivals, and intendant of the Berlin State Opera from 2010 to 2018. He directed internationally, including Beethoven's Fidelio at the Metropolitan Opera, the 2000 Ring cycle production at the Bayreuth Festival, and the 2002 world premiere of Friedrich Cerha's Der Riese vom Steinfeld at the Vienna State Opera.

== Life and career ==
Flimm was born in Gießen on 17 July 1941, but grew up in Cologne in a Protestant physician's family. He studied theory of drama, literature, and sociology at the University of Cologne, and gained theatre experience at the Theater der Keller, a small stage in a basement with an associated acting school. His first position was assistant director at the Munich Kammerspiele in 1968. He was stage director at the Nationaltheater Mannheim, director at the Thalia Theater in Hamburg from 1973 to 1974, and worked at the Schauspiel Köln from 1979. A first success there was Kleist's Das Käthchen von Heilbronn, with Katharina Thalbach in the title role.

In 1985, Flimm moved again to the Thalia Theater, where he was general manager for 15 years. Among his most important productions there were works by Anton Chekhov, Platonov in 1989, Uncle Vanya in 1995, and Three Sisters in 1999, Ibsen's Peer Gynt in 1985 and The Wild Duck in 1994, Schnitzler's Liebelei in 1988 and Das weite Land in 1995, and Shakespeare's Hamlet in 1986, King Lear in 1992, and As You Like It in 1998. The theatre was well-attended and became an intellectual centre during this period.

In 1978, he directed his first opera, Luigi Nono's Al gran sole carico d'amore at the Oper Frankfurt. He staged Offenbach's Les contes d'Hoffmann at the Staatsoper Hamburg in 1981, and Mozart's Così fan tutte in Amsterdam, where he first collaborated with conductor Nikolaus Harnoncourt. Flimm directed operas at La Scala in Milan, the Royal Opera House in London, and the Vienna State Opera. He directed Beethoven's Fidelio at the Metropolitan Opera in New York City. In summer 2000, he directed a new production of Wagner's Der Ring des Nibelungen for the Bayreuth Festival, in sets by Erich Wonder and conducted by Giuseppe Sinopoli. His first production at the Berlin State Opera was Verdi's Otello in 2001, conducted by Daniel Barenboim. In June 2002, he directed the world premiere of Der Riese vom Steinfeld by Friedrich Cerha at the Vienna State Opera, conducted by Michael Boder.

Flimm was a professor at the University of Hamburg, and also taught at Harvard University and the New York University. He was a member of the Academies of Arts in Hamburg, Munich, Berlin, and Frankfurt. He received an honorary doctorate from the University of Hildesheim. He was awarded the Medal for Art and Science of Hamburg, the Konrad Wolf Prize of the Academy of Arts in Berlin, the Order of Merit of the Federal Republic of Germany, and the Austrian Decoration for Science and Art.

Between 1999 and 2003, Flimm was the president of the Deutscher Bühnenverein (German Stage Association). He managed the drama section of the Salzburg Festival from 2001 to 2005, and from 2005 until 2007 he was general manager of the RuhrTriennale, following founding director Gerard Mortier. He was artistic director of the Salzburg Festival from 2006 to 2010, staging operas such as Monteverdi's L'incoronazione di Poppea and Purcell's King Arthur. He initiated a Young Directors Project at the festival that made promising new directors internationally known, such as Alvis Hermanis. He engaged Christian Stückl to direct Hofmannsthal's Jedermann, modernising the traditional festival feature.

In 2010, Flimm became intendant of the Berlin State Opera. He managed the house during the long period of restoration, along with Daniel Barenboim as Generalmusikdirektor. After the reopening in 2017, he retired in 2018.

Flimm died in Hamelwörden, north of Hamburg, on 4 February 2023 at age 81.

== Films ==
- Uns reicht das nicht (1979, TV film)
- Through Roses (1997)
- Käthchens Traum (2004, TV film)
