= Nordkehdingen =

Samtgemeinde in Lower Saxony

- Samtgemeinde
- Location of Nordkehdingen within Stade district
- Interactive map of Nordkehdingen
- Location within Germany Location within Lower Saxony
- Coordinates: 53°50′N 9°17′E
- Country: Germany
- State: Lower Saxony
- District: Stade
- Seat: Freiburg
- Subdivisions: 5 municipalities

Area
  - Total: 193.19 km^{2} (74.59 sq mi)

Population (2025-12-31)
  - Total: 6,870
  - Density: 35.6/km^{2} (92.1/sq mi)
- Time zone: UTC+01:00 (CET)
  - Summer (DST): UTC+02:00 (CEST)
- Website: www.nordkehdingen.de

Nordkehdingen is a Samtgemeinde ("collective municipality") on the left bank of the Elbe, north west of Hamburg (Germany). Nordkehdingen has a population of 6,870 (Dec. 2025) and belongs to the district of Stade, Lower Saxony. The seat of the municipality is in Freiburg.

The Samtgemeinde Nordkehdingen consists of the following municipalities:

1. Balje
2. Freiburg
3. Krummendeich
4. Oederquart
5. Wischhafen
