= Freiburg, Lower Saxony =

Freiburg Freiburg an der Elbe (German) Freiborg an'e Elv (Low Saxon)
- Municipality
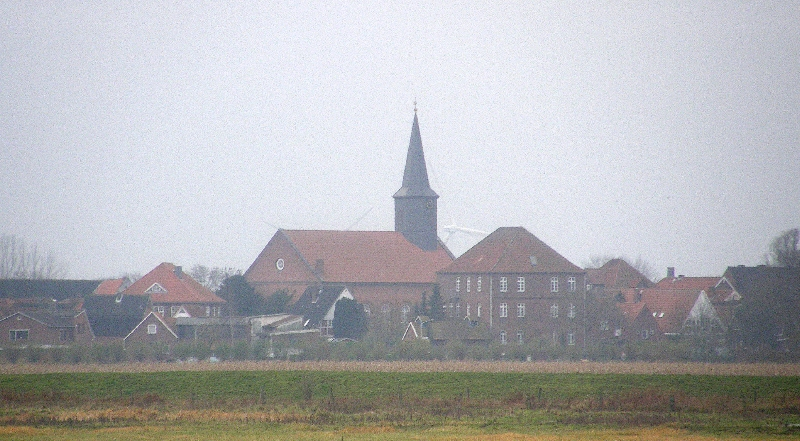
- Panorama of the town in the early morning fog

- Coat of arms

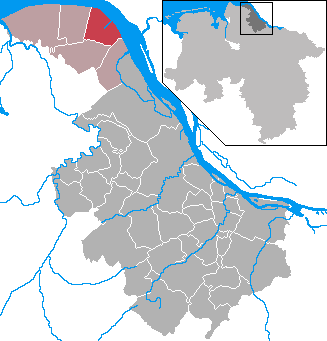
- Location of Freiburg within Stade district
- Interactive map of Freiburg
- Location within Germany Location within Lower Saxony
- Coordinates: 53°49′23″N 9°17′4″E
- Country: Germany
- State: Lower Saxony
- District: Stade
- Municipal assoc.: Nordkehdingen

Government
  - Mayor: Walter Wolfkühler (CDU)

Area
  - Total: 34.11 km^{2} (13.17 sq mi)
- Elevation: 0–5 m (0–16 ft)

Population (2025-12-31)
  - Total: 1,742
  - Density: 51.07/km^{2} (132.3/sq mi)
- Time zone: UTC+01:00 (CET)
  - Summer (DST): UTC+02:00 (CEST)
- Postal codes: 21729
- Dialling codes: 04779
- Vehicle registration: STD
- Website: www.nordkehdingen.de

Freiburg on the Elbe (in High German, officially Freiburg an der Elbe; short: Freiburg/Elbe, Freiborg/Elv (in Low German), or Freiborg (in Low Saxon) is a municipality in the district of Stade, Lower Saxony, Germany.

== History ==
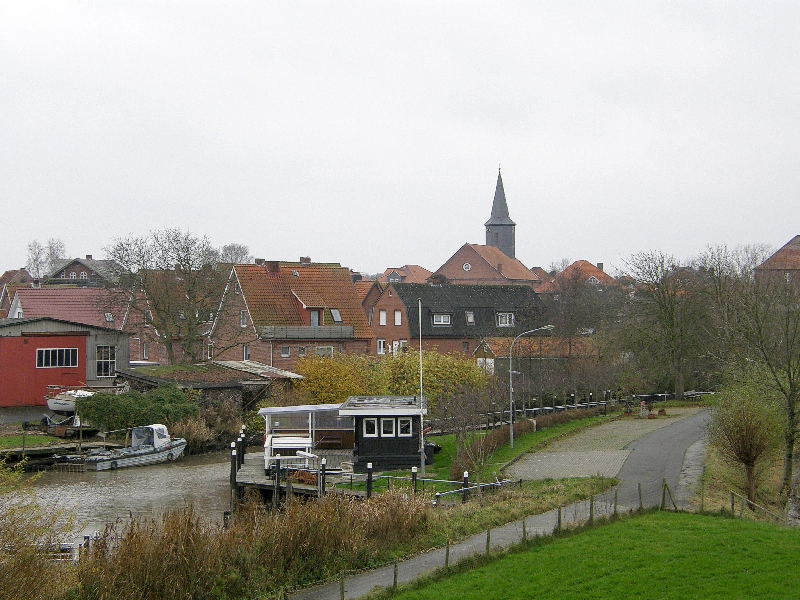
View of the town with Evangelical Lutheran St. Wulphardi Church.

Freiburg belonged to the Prince-Archbishopric of Bremen, a territory of imperial immediacy established in 1180. In the mid-16th century Freiburg adopted Lutheranism. During the Leaguist occupation under Johan 't Serclaes, Count of Tilly (1628–1630), Freiburg suffered from attempts of re-Catholisation.

In 1648 the prince-archbishopric was transformed into the Duchy of Bremen, which was first ruled in personal union by the Swedish and from 1715 on by the Hanoverian Crown. In 1807 the short-lived Kingdom of Westphalia annexed the duchy, before France annexed it in 1810. In 1813 the Duchy of Bremen was restored to the Electorate of Hanover, which - after its upgrade to the Kingdom of Hanover in 1814 - incorporated the duchy in a real union and the ducal territory, including Freiburg, became part of the Stade Region, established in 1823.
