= Anke Kaysser-Pyzalla =

German mechanical engineer (born 1966)

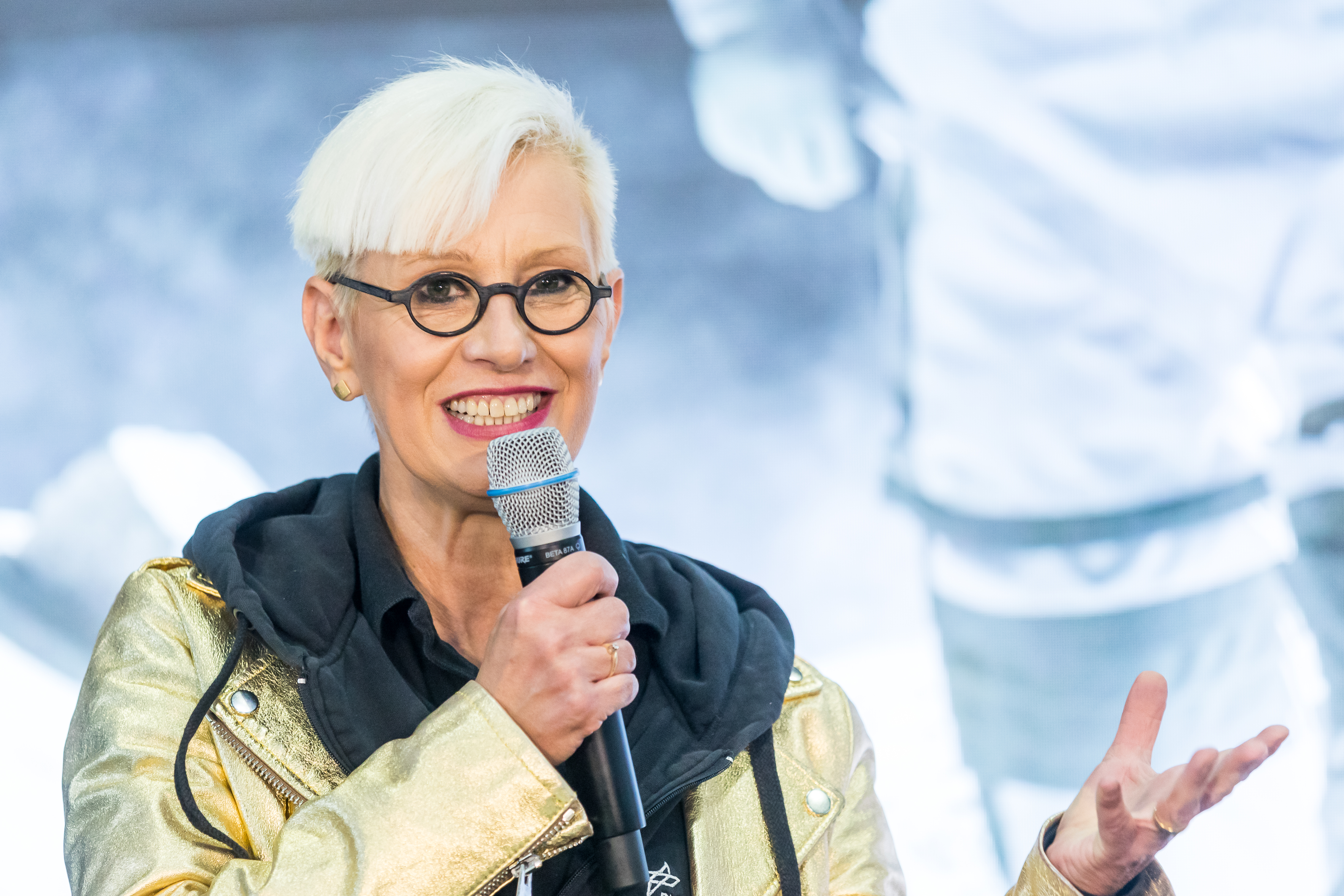
- Born: 26 September 1966 (age 60); Schwerte, North Rhine-Westphalia, Germany
- Education: Ruhr University Bochum
- Occupation: CEO of the German Aerospace Center

Anke Kaysser-Pyzella (born 26 September 1966) is a German materials scientist and mechanical engineer who has been the CEO of the German Aerospace Center since October 2020. She had previously served as the President of the Technical University of Braunschweig from 2017 until 2020.

== Early life and education ==
Kaysser-Pyzalla received her doctoral degree from Ruhr University Bochum.

== Other activities ==
- Fraport, Member of the Economic Advisory Board
