= Balje, Lower Saxony =

Balje
- Municipality
- Coat of arms

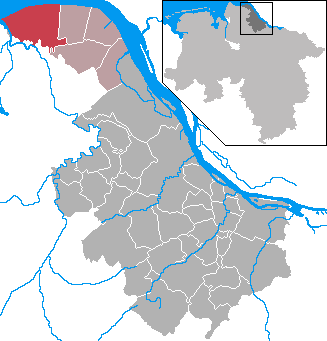
- Location of Balje within Stade district
- Interactive map of Balje
- Location within Germany Location within Lower Saxony
- Coordinates: 53°49′58″N 09°08′07″E
- Country: Germany
- State: Lower Saxony
- District: Stade
- Municipal assoc.: Nordkehdingen

Government
  - Mayor: Gerhard von Ahn (SPD)

Area
  - Total: 58.09 km^{2} (22.43 sq mi)
- Elevation: 2 m (6.6 ft)

Population (2025-12-31)
  - Total: 881
  - Density: 15.2/km^{2} (39.3/sq mi)
- Time zone: UTC+01:00 (CET)
  - Summer (DST): UTC+02:00 (CEST)
- Postal codes: 21730
- Dialling codes: 04752, 04753
- Vehicle registration: STD
- Website: www.nordkehdingen.de

Balje (German pronunciation: [ˈbaljə]) is a municipality in the district of Stade, in Lower Saxony, Germany.

It belonged to the Prince-Archbishopric of Bremen. In 1648 the Prince-Archbishopric was transformed into the Duchy of Bremen, which was first ruled in personal union by the Swedish and from 1715 on by the Hanoverian Crown. In 1823 the Duchy was abolished and its territory became part of the Stade Region.
