= Krummendeich =

Krummendeich Krummendeich (German) Krummendiek (Low Saxon)
- Municipality
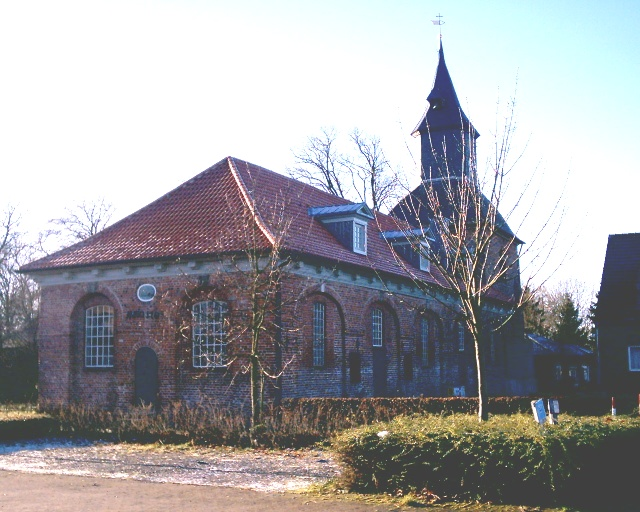
- Church of St. Nicolai (St. Nicholas)

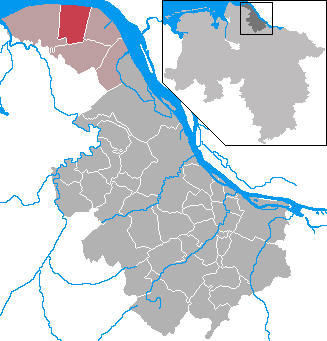
- Location of Krummendeich within Stade district
- Interactive map of Krummendeich
- Location within Germany Location within Lower Saxony
- Coordinates: 53°49′52″N 9°12′38″E
- Country: Germany
- State: Lower Saxony
- District: Stade
- Municipal assoc.: Nordkehdingen

Government
  - Mayor: Johann-Heinrich Feil (CDU)

Area
  - Total: 30.03 km^{2} (11.59 sq mi)
- Elevation: 2 m (6.6 ft)

Population (2025-12-31)
  - Total: 481
  - Density: 16.0/km^{2} (41.5/sq mi)
- Time zone: UTC+01:00 (CET)
  - Summer (DST): UTC+02:00 (CEST)
- Postal codes: 21732
- Dialling codes: 04779
- Vehicle registration: STD
- Website: www.nordkehdingen.de

Krummendeich (German pronunciation: [ˈkʁʊməndaɪç]; Low German: Krummendiek) is a municipality in the district of Stade, in Lower Saxony, Germany.

== History ==
Krummendeich belonged to the Prince-Archbishopric of Bremen. In the mid-16th century, the inhabitants adopted Lutheranism. During the Leaguist occupation under Tilly (1628–1630), they suffered from attempts of re-Catholicisation.

In 1648, the prince-archbishopric was transformed into the Duchy of Bremen, which was first ruled in personal union by the Swedish and from 1715 on by the Hanoverian Crown. In 1807, the ephemeric Kingdom of Westphalia annexed the Duchy, before France annexed it in 1810. In 1813, the Duchy was restored to the Electorate of Hanover, which – after its upgrade to the Kingdom of Hanover in 1814 – incorporated the Duchy in a real union and the Ducal territory, including Krummendeich, became part of the Stade Region, established in 1823.
