= Plataforma Solar de Almería =

Solar power in Spain

Coordinates: 37°05′30″N 2°21′30″W

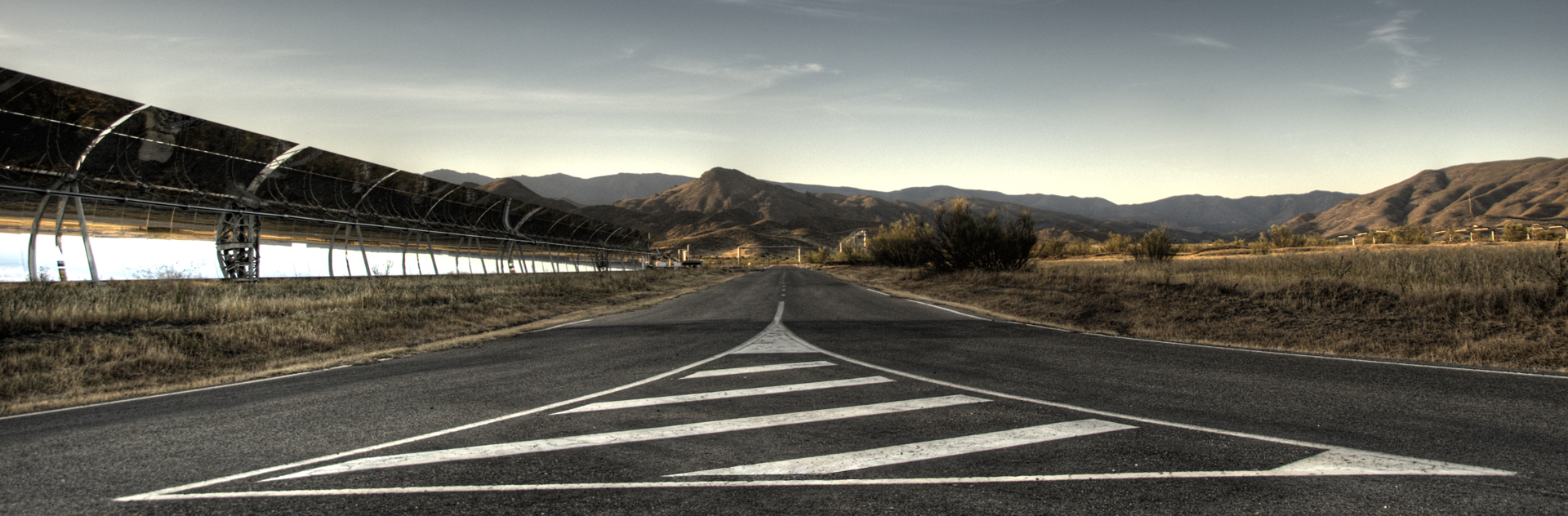
Plataforma Solar de Almería

The Solar Platform of Almería (PSA) is the largest concentrating solar technology research, development and test centre in Europe (beside Fort-Romeu, France), situated in the Province of Almería, Spain in Tabernas.

== History ==
The PSA was founded in 1981 by the IEA – International Energy Agency. Since 1987 it has belonged to Spain through the Centro de Investigaciones Energéticas, Medioambientales y Tecnológicas (CIEMAT), a public research organization of the Government of Spain. PSA has been a European Large Installation Facility since 1990 and belongs to the selected group (created in 2014) of Spanish singular scientific and technical infrastructures (ICTS, its Spanish acronym).

== Testing ==
Over 20,000 m^{2} of mirrors are installed on a 400,000 m^{2} (99-acre) site. There are several techniques tested under practical conditions, mainly solar thermal power plants. Hydrosol-2 is a solar power tower and a set of heliostats to collect the solar thermal energy.

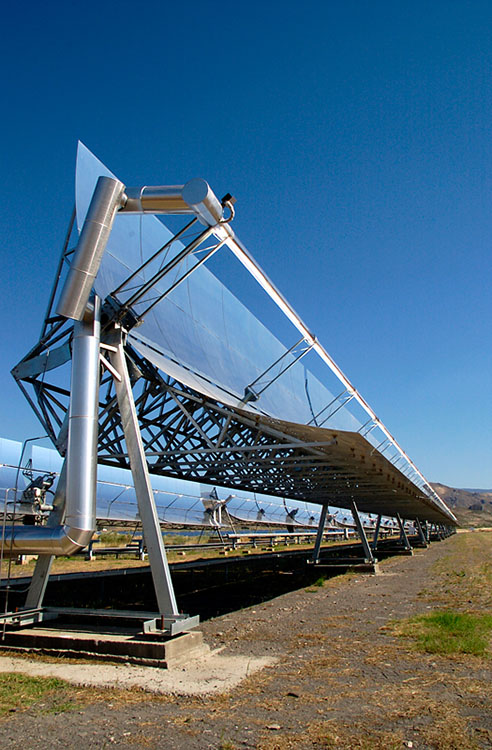
DISS Collector

== Site ==
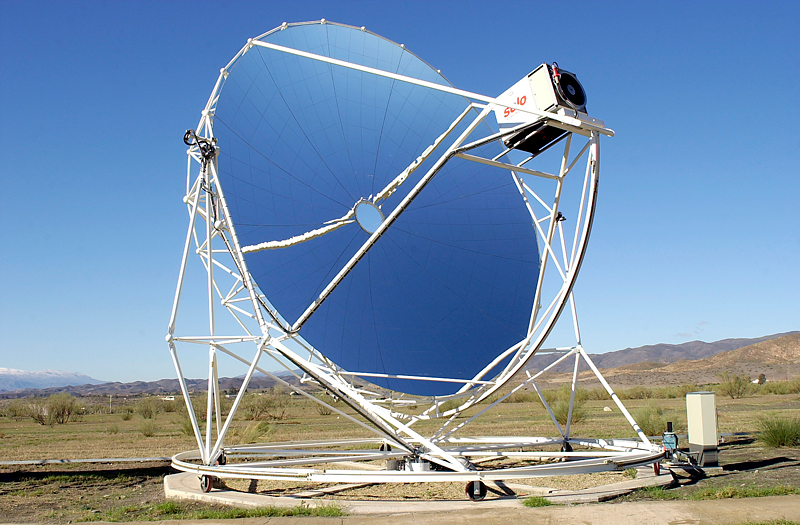
Eurodish

- Facility belongs to CIEMAT, a public research organization under the Spanish Ministry of Economy and Competitiveness (MINECO).
- R&D activities focus on potential industrial applications of concentrating solar thermal energy and solar photochemistry.
- Built on a plot of 103 hectares located in Tabernas (Almería).
- About 120 staff, of which 40% are researchers.

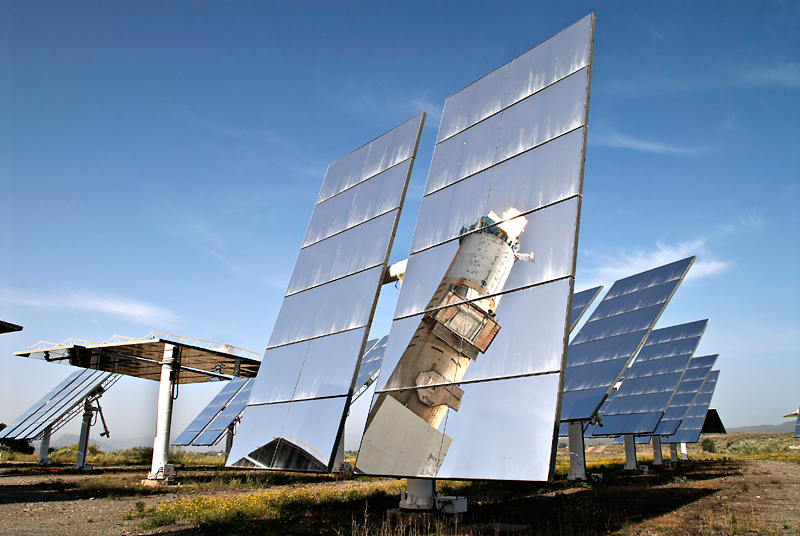
CESA-1 Heliostat Field

== Milestones ==
- 1975: The International Energy Agency (IEA) decided to design and build a facility in one location to validate the solar thermal technology potential for the production of electricity.
- 1976: A work group in the IEA proposed the development of two 500 kW thermosolar power plants (CRS y DCS) within the SSPS project.
- 1977: Spain, through the Centro de Estudios de la Energía (CEE), started a study on a solar power plant tower of 1,2 MWe (Project CESA 1)
- 1978: Basic engineering for project CESA-1 started, decision to install the solar project in Tabernas, Almería.
- 1979: Start of civil works for the construction of PSA
- 1981: Official inauguration of CRS and DCS plants of the Project SSPS
- 1983: Inauguration of the CESA-1 plant
- 1985: SSPS project finished and the activity undertaken here was replaced by SolarPACES activity that remains ongoing today
- 1986: Unification of the various facilities in the PSA, which was taken over by the Institute of Renewable Energy of CIEMAT.
- 1987: Signing of the Hispano-German Agreement with DLR for the co-management of PSA
- 1990: Recognition as 'Large European Science Facility'
- 1998: The management of PSA is no longer based on the Hispano-German Agreement; responsibility of the PSA is entirely Spanish
- 2005: The PSA is fully integrated into the CIEMAT structure, becoming a division of the Department of Energy

== Research ==
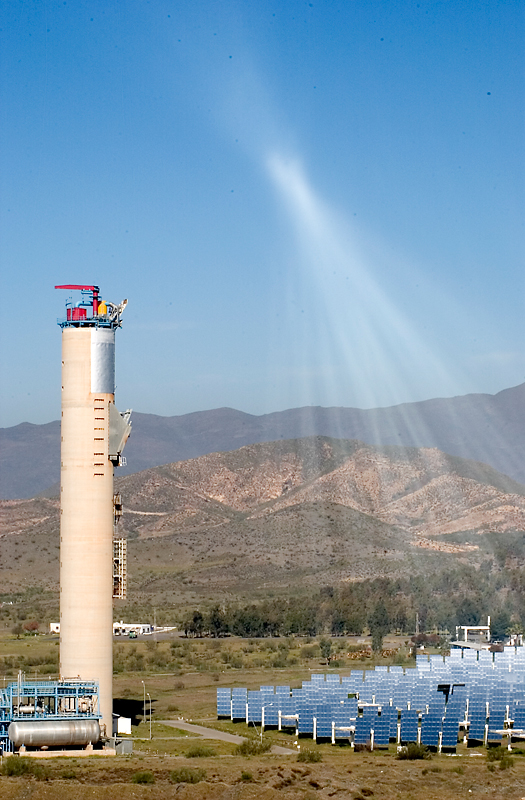
CESA-1 Tower

Research activity at the Plataforma Solar de Almería has been structured around three R&D units:

- Solar Concentrating Systems Unit.
- Solar Desalination Unit.
- Solar Treatment of Water Unit.

== Test facilities ==
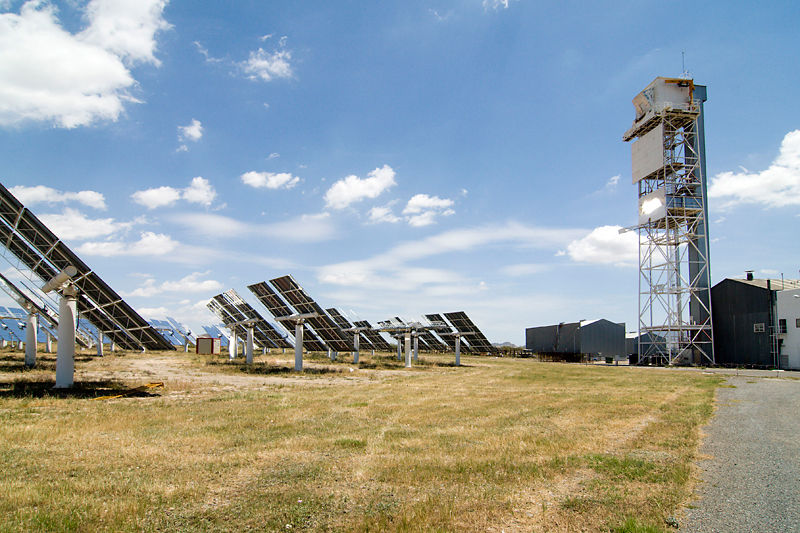
CRS field with Hydrosol II receiver

1. CESA-1 and SSPS-CRS central receiver systems, 5 and 2.5 MWth respectively.
2. TCP-100 2.3-MWth parabolic-trough collector field with associated 115-m3 thermal oil storage system.
3. DISS 2.5-MWth test loop, an excellent experimental system for two-phase flow and direct steam generation with parabolic trough collectors in different working conditions, up to 500 °C and 100bar.
4. The FRESDEMO “linear Fresnel” technology loop.
5. Pressurized gas-cooled parabolic-trough collectors system coupled to two-tank molten salt thermal energy storage facility.
6. A parabolic-trough collector test facility with thermal oil (the HTF-PTC Test loop) for qualification of solar components.
7. A rotary test bench for parabolic trough collectors, named KONTAS.
8. 4-unit dish/Stirling facility, named DISTAL, and 2 EuroDish units.
9. A group of 3 solar furnaces, two of them with horizontal axis 60 kWth and 40 kWth, and a third one with vertical axis of 5 kWth.
10. A test stand for small evaluation and qualification of parabolic trough collectors, named CAPSOL.
11. A 14-stage multi-effect distillation (MED) plant.
12. A multiple solar detoxification and disinfection application facilities.
13. The ARFRISOL building, an energy research demonstrator office building prototypes.
14. A meteorological station integrated in the ‘Baseline Surface Radiation Network’.

== See also ==
- List of solar thermal power stations
- Solar power in Spain
