= Wischhafen =

- Municipality
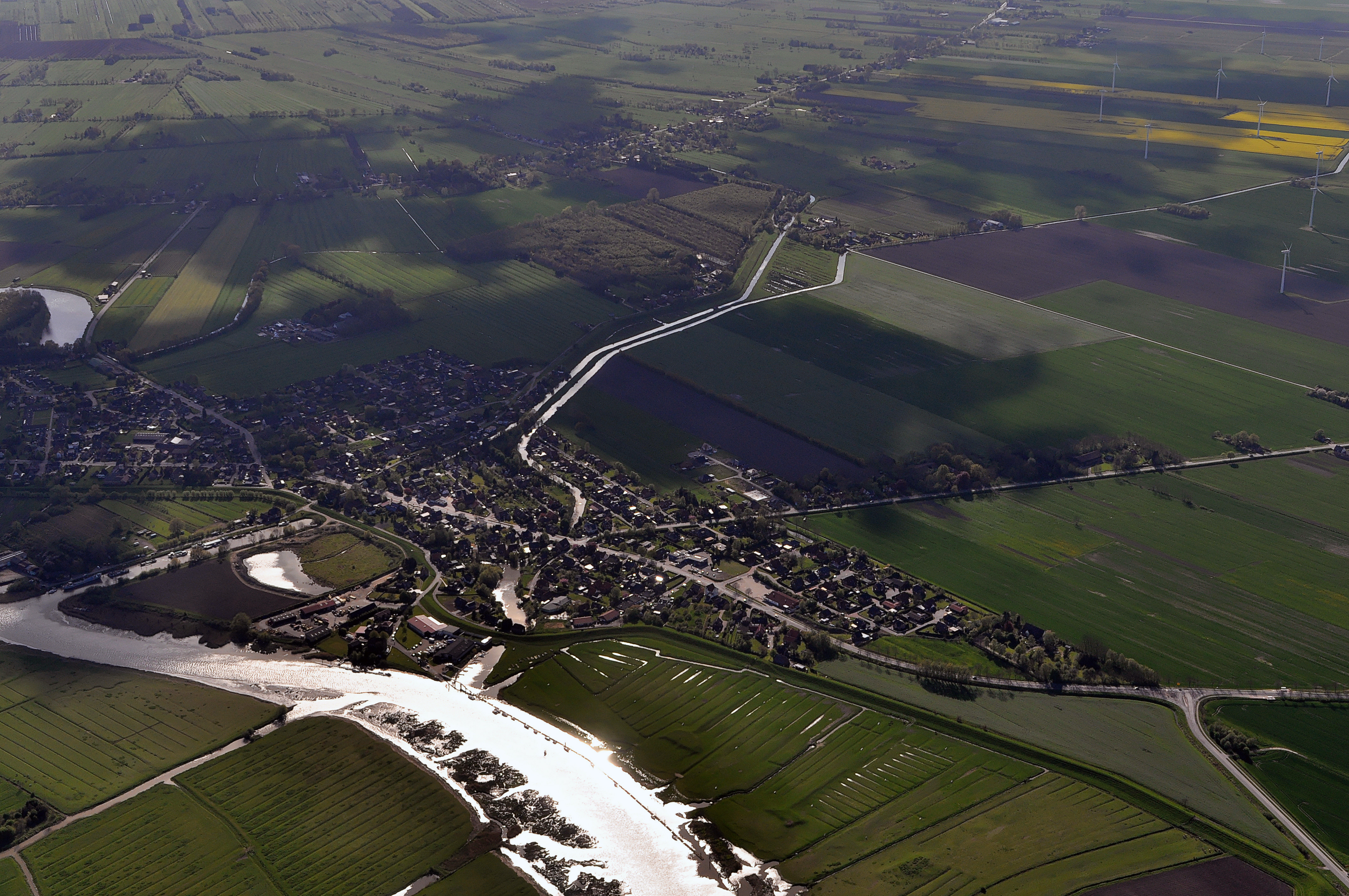

- Coat of arms

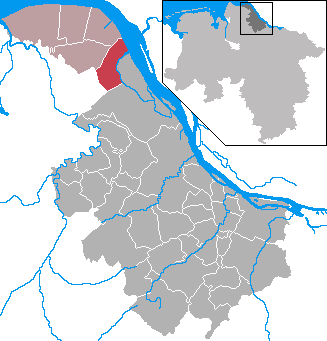
- Location of Wischhafen within Stade district
- Interactive map of Wischhafen
- Location within Germany Location within Lower Saxony
- Coordinates: 53°46′14″N 09°18′58″E
- Country: Germany
- State: Lower Saxony
- District: Stade
- Municipal assoc.: Nordkehdingen
- Subdivisions: 6 districts

Government
  - Mayor: Heinrich von Borstel (SPD)

Area
  - Total: 33.68 km^{2} (13.00 sq mi)
- Elevation: 1 m (3.3 ft)

Population (2025-12-31)
  - Total: 2,857
  - Density: 84.83/km^{2} (219.7/sq mi)
- Time zone: UTC+01:00 (CET)
  - Summer (DST): UTC+02:00 (CEST)
- Postal codes: 21737
- Dialling codes: 04770, 04779
- Vehicle registration: STD
- Website: www.nordkehdingen.de

Wischhafen (low German Wischhoben) is a municipality in the district of Stade, in Lower Saxony, Germany.

== History ==
It belonged to the Prince-Archbishopric of Bremen. In 1648 the Prince-Archbishopric was transformed into the Duchy of Bremen, which was first ruled in personal union by the Swedish and from 1715 on by the Hanoverian Crown. In 1823 the Duchy was abolished and its territory became part of the Stade Region.

== Geography ==
In the north of Wischhafen is the Elbe river. In the East is the South Elbe River. In the South of Wischhafen is the village Drochtersen. In the north are the two villages Freiburg and Oederquart.

=== Parts of the municipality ===
Wischhafen has the following parts:

- Hamelwörden
- Wischhafen
- Neuland
- Wolfsbruchermoor
- Neulandermoor
- Hamelwördenermoor.

== Literature ==
- Hartmut Reichert u. a.: Chronik der Gemeinde Wischhafen, Stade 2001
- Hamelwörden. In: Heinrich Schmidt-Barrien: Aus meinen Jungensjahren. Uthlede, Hamelwörden und Barrien. 1902–1917. Heide 1992, Seite 26-127; ISBN 3-8042-0572-0
