= Bundesautobahn 25 =

Federal motorway in Germany

A 25
- Bundesautobahn 25
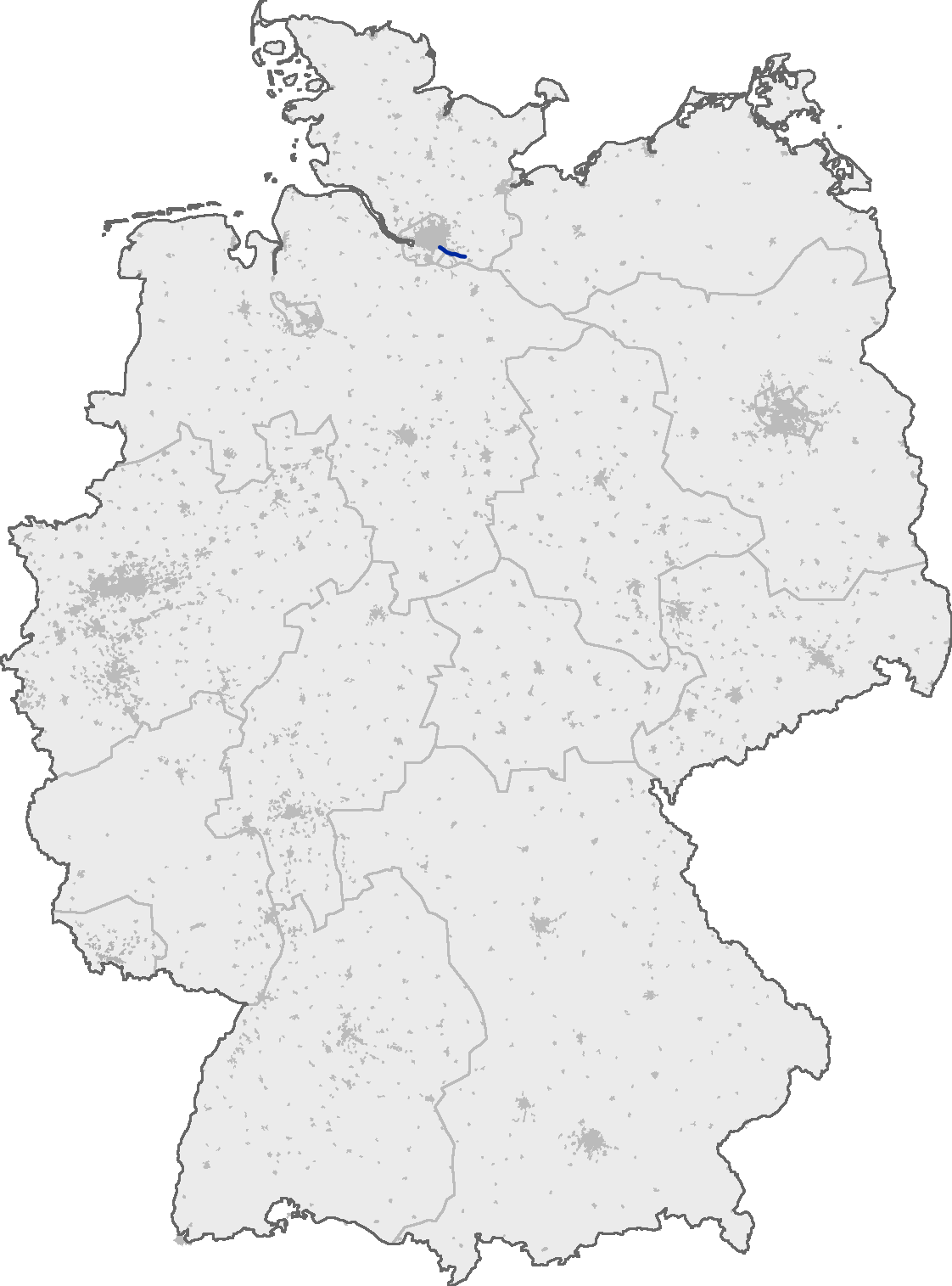

Route information
- Length: 18 km (11 mi)

Major junctions
- West end: A 1 in Hamburg
- East end: B 404 in Geesthacht

Location
- Country: Germany
- States: Hamburg, Schleswig-Holstein

Highway system
- Roads in Germany; Autobahns; List; Federal; List; State; E-roads
← A 24	→ A 26

Bundesautobahn 25 (translates from German as Federal Motorway 25, short form Autobahn 25, abbreviated as BAB 25 or A 25) is an autobahn in northwestern Germany, connecting southwestern Hamburg to Geesthacht.

== Exit list ==
State	District	Location	km	mi	Exit	Name	Destinations	Notes
Hamburg	Bergedorf	Moorfleet	0.0	0.0	1	Hamburg-Südost interchange	A 1 / E22 – Bremen, Hannover, Hamburg-Centrum, Hamburg-Süd interchange A 1 / E22 – Lübeck, Berlin, Hamburg-Moorfleet	Western endpoint of motorway Hamburg-Süd interchange is now called Norderelbe interchange
Hamburg	Bergedorf	Allermöhe	3.3	2.1	2	Hamburg-Allermöhe	Hamburg-Allermöhe	
Hamburg	Bergedorf	Allermöhe	5.7	3.5	3	Hamburg-Neuallermöhe-West	Hamburg-Neuallermöhe-West	
Hamburg	Bergedorf	Allermöhe	7.7	4.8	4	Hamburg-Nettelnburg	Hamburg-Nettelnburg, Hamburg-Neuallermöhe-Ost	
Hamburg	Bergedorf	Bergedorf (quarter)	9.6	6.0	5	Hamburg-Bergedorf	Hamburg-Bergedorf, Wentorf	Wentorf is only signed eastbound
Hamburg	Bergedorf	Curslack	11.9	7.4	6	Hamburg-Curslack	Hamburg-Curslack	Exit leads to Neuengamme concentration camp
Schleswig-Holstein	Herzogtum Lauenburg	Escheburg	18.4	11.4	7	Geesthacht	B 404 – Lüneburg, Geesthacht industrial area B 404 – Lauenburg ( B 5), Geesthacht (B 5), Schwarzenbek	At-grade intersection with the B 404 Eastern Endpoint of motorway
Schleswig-Holstein	Herzogtum Lauenburg	Escheburg			7	Geesthacht (interchange)	B 5 – Geesthacht; B 404 – Lüneburg ( A 21 – Lüneburg)	Proposed junction with B 5/B 404 An interchange with the planned motorway A 21 will be built later The A 25 motorway will end here when the A 21 motorway is completed
Schleswig-Holstein	Herzogtum Lauenburg	Escheburg			Bridge	Straßen- und Bahnbrücke	Hamburg-Bergedorf - Geesthacht railway and the B 5 road	Proposed bridge Future A 21 motorway will run across this bridge length: 530 m
Schleswig-Holstein	Herzogtum Lauenburg	Kröppelshagen-Fahrendorf			Tunnel	Straßentunnel	—	Proposed tunnel Future A 21 motorway will run across this tunnel length: 75 m
Schleswig-Holstein	Herzogtum Lauenburg	Hohenhorn			8	Geesthacht-Nord	B 404 – Schwarzenbek; Geesthacht ( A 21 – Kiel)	Proposed junction with B 404 The planned motorway A 21 will continue towards Schwarzenbek/Kiel
Schleswig-Holstein	Herzogtum Lauenburg	Hohenhorn			—	Route transition	B 5 – Lauenburg	Proposed transition with B 5 planned extension ends here
1.000 mi = 1.609 km; 1.000 km = 0.621 mi: Proposed
