= Wentorf bei Hamburg =

- Municipality
- Coat of arms

- Location of Wentorf bei Hamburg within Herzogtum Lauenburg district
- Interactive map of Wentorf bei Hamburg
- Location within Germany Location within Schleswig-Holstein
- Coordinates: 53°29′35″N 10°15′12″E
- Country: Germany
- State: Schleswig-Holstein
- District: Herzogtum Lauenburg

Government
  - Mayor: Dirk Petersen (Greens)

Area
  - Total: 6.87 km^{2} (2.65 sq mi)
- Elevation: 48 m (157 ft)

Population (2025-12-31)
  - Total: 13,477
  - Density: 1,960/km^{2} (5,080/sq mi)
- Time zone: UTC+01:00 (CET)
  - Summer (DST): UTC+02:00 (CEST)
- Postal codes: 21465
- Dialling codes: 040
- Vehicle registration: RZ
- Website: www.wentorf.de

Wentorf bei Hamburg (German pronunciation: [ˈvɛntɔʁf baɪ ˈhambʊʁk], lit. 'Wentorf near Hamburg') is a municipality in the district of Lauenburg, in Schleswig-Holstein, Germany. It is situated on the river Bille, approx. 10 km northwest of the town of Geesthacht, and adjoining the town of Reinbek. It is situated on the city limits of the city of Hamburg, 20 km east of the centre of the city.

== History ==
The village Wentorf was first mentioned in 1217 under the name "Wenetdorp". A name routed in "Wendendorf" which simply meant “a village inhabited by Slavs". In the course of its eventful history, Wentorf has changed significantly. Remnants of its distant past can only be found sparsely in the present day.

In the Middle Ages Wentorf belonged to the Reinbek monastery and after the Reformation it was ruled by the duchy of Schwarzenbek. After the administrative reforms of 1889, the old farming village had a structural change. A residential area was built near the river Bille and the train station while craftsmen and workers settled in other nearby areas. By 1910, the village of Wentorf with its beautiful landscape and its then 1200 inhabitants had developed into a suburb of Hamburg. Since the middle of the 19th century, Wentorf was connected to Hamburg City by railroad and country road. As a result, Wentorf had significantly different opportunities to develop compared to most of the neighbouring communities that had kept their rural character.

Shortly before the start of World War II, barracks were built in Wentorf that housed over 3000 soldiers. After 1945 these were used for "displaced persons" and from 1952 to 1960 as a transit camp for refugees from the GDR.

From 1960 to the mid-1990s, Wentorf was also had a Bundeswehr base. A large part of the 16th Panzergrenadier Brigade was stationed in the "Bose Bergmann"- and "Bismarck"-barracks. The cultural monuments in Wentorf bei Hamburg are included in the list of cultural monuments of Schleswig-Holstein. The former military training area "Wentorfer Lohe" (German pronunciation: [ˌvɛntɔʁfɐ ˈloːə]) now serves as a local recreation area.

== Politics ==
The municipality fulfils supra-regional tasks, especially in the areas of education (primary school, community school, high school, several day-care centres), sports, culture and environmental protection. The urban land-use planning of the municipality is geared towards a further continuous increase in the number of inhabitants of up to a maximum of 14,000 inhabitants.

=== Community representation ===
Since the local election on 6 May 2018, the 23 seats in the municipal council have been distributed among the individual political parties as follows:

- CDU: 8 seats
- SPD: 5 seats
- GRÜNE: 8 seats
- FDP: 2 seats

=== Coat of arms ===
Blazon: "In gold, a six-spoke black wagon wheel under a green diamond wreath in the head of the shield."

The coat of arms colours gold, black and green were taken from the colours of the Ascanians, the dukes of Saxe-Lauenburg, who strongly influenced the history of the municipality of Wentorf bei Hamburg for five centuries. The wagon wheel marks the importance of its invention for the economic development of Wentorf. It is reminiscent of the traditional community services that blacksmiths owed to their ruler for centuries, of the farmers' timber industry and the trade and transit traffic on the former freight route between Lübeck and Hamburg, today's federal highway B207. The green diamond wreath in the shield head is placed above the wagon wheel and referencing the history of Wentorf. It defines the uniqueness of the wheel as a symbol for community. The green diamond wreath is also passed down from the coat of arms of the Ascanian ancestors. The dukes of Saxony-Lauenburg saw it as a symbol of the well-being of their duchy – and thus of their compatriots.

== Economy ==
Present day Wentorf is a small town with over 12,500 inhabitants. There are many commuters among employed residents who work mainly in the city of Hamburg. The economy is predominantly characterised by small businesses and handicrafts. The European headquarters of Sanrio is also located in Wentorf.

== Education ==
In Wentorf there is a primary school, a community school and a grammar school. The Wentorf Community School is an amalgamation of the Fritz-Specht-Schule (secondary school) and the Realschule. The merger took place in the school year 2010/2011, initially as a regional school. An additional service offered by the community school is the open day school.

== Religion ==
There is an Evangelical Lutheran parish in Wentorf, and the Martin Luther Church was established in 1952. Since the merger of the Catholic parishes from Reinbek, Glinde and Trittau on 1 January 2006, the Catholic parish of Wentorf has belonged to the parish "Seliger Niels Stensen", whose main church is the Sacred Heart of Jesus in Reinbek. In May 2019 this became part of the newly founded parish of Saint Elisabeth in the pastoral area of "Bille-Elbe-Sachsenwald".

== Transport ==
The VHH bus line 235 connects Wentorf to the rapid transit network of Hamburg, the Hamburger Verkehrsverbund (HVV). The buses run between the Reinbek S-Bahn station (S-Bahn line S21), the Hamburg-Bergedorf S-Bahn and regional train station. Hamburg city center can be reached within 26 minutes from Reinbek train station.

Wentorf is also connected to the Autokraft Gmbh regional bus route 8810. Coming from Bergedorf, it connects Wentorf with the neighbouring villages Börnsen, Dassendorf and Schwarzenbek with its final stop in Mölln.

The federal highway B207 also runs through Wentorf. It leads to Hamburg-Bergedorf in one direction and to Mölln and Ratzeburg in the other direction.

== Personalities ==
- Günther Enderlein (1872–1968), zoologist, died in Wentorf
- Carl von Tiedemann (1878–1979), Lieutenant General
- Fritz Specht (1891–1975), German writer
- Christian Bruhn (* 1934), composer, arranger and lyricist
- Volker Schirrmacher (* 1943), Cancer researcher and immunologist
- Achim Reichel (* 1944), musician, composer and producer
- Hajo Leschke (* 1945), German mathematical physicist
- Roger Willemsen (1955–2016), Publicist and TV presenter
- Ike Moriz (* 1972), South African singer, composer, actor and former head boy at Wentorf grammar school
- Carina Witthöft (* 1995), German tennis player

== Literature ==
- Ralf Heese, Wolfgang Stabenow, William Boehart (Ed.): "Vom Süden Wentorfs zu Wentorf Süd", Viebranz-Verlag, Autumn 2004, ISBN 3-921595-45-2
- Hildegard Ballerstedt, Wolfgang Blandow, William Boehart: Wentorf bei Hamburg. Reihe Archivbilder, Sutton-Verlag, February 2006, ISBN 978-3-89702-925-5
