= Gülzow =

- Municipality
- Coat of arms

- Location of Gülzow within Herzogtum Lauenburg district
- Interactive map of Gülzow
- Location within Germany Location within Schleswig-Holstein
- Coordinates: 53°26′32″N 10°29′22″E
- Country: Germany
- State: Schleswig-Holstein
- District: Herzogtum Lauenburg
- Municipal assoc.: Schwarzenbek-Land

Government
  - Mayor: Günther Noß

Area
  - Total: 17.07 km^{2} (6.59 sq mi)
- Elevation: 26 m (85 ft)

Population (2025-12-31)
  - Total: 1,327
  - Density: 77.74/km^{2} (201.3/sq mi)
- Time zone: UTC+01:00 (CET)
  - Summer (DST): UTC+02:00 (CEST)
- Postal codes: 21483
- Dialling codes: 04151
- Vehicle registration: RZ
- Website: www.amt- schwarzenbek-land.de

Gülzow (German pronunciation: [ˈɡʏltsoː]) is a municipality in Lauenburg district in Schleswig-Holstein, Germany, founded in the 13th century.

It has a population of 1,500 and is situated near Hamburg, between Lauenburg, Geesthacht and Schwarzenbek. There is a market square, where fresh fruit, vegetables and other things can be bought. In the square there is also a café and a small museum of local history.
