= Princess Felicitas of Prussia =

Prussian princess (born 1934)

- Princess of Prussia
- Born: 7 June 1934; Bonn, Nazi Germany
- Died: 1 August 2009 (aged 75); Wohltorf, Germany
- Spouse: Dinnies von der Osten (m. 1958; div. 1972) Jörg von Nostitz-Wallwitz (m. 1972)
Names
- Felicitas Cecilie Alexandrine Helene Dorothea
- House: Hohenzollern
- Father: Prince Wilhelm of Prussia
- Mother: Dorothea von Salviati

Princess Felicitas Cecilie Alexandrine Helene Dorothea (7 June 1934 - 1 August 2009) was a German member of the House of Hohenzollern. She was the older daughter of Prince Wilhelm of Prussia, eldest son of Crown Prince Wilhelm, and Dorothea von Salviati. She was also a great-granddaughter of Emperor Wilhelm II and Empress Augusta Victoria.

== Early life and family ==
Felicitas Cecilie Alexandrine Helene Dorothea was born on 7 June 1934 in Bonn, Germany, as the eldest daughter of Prince Wilhelm of Prussia and Dorothea von Salviati. She was the first grandchild of Wilhelm, German Crown Prince and a great-granddaughter of Kaiser Wilhelm II. Her younger sister, Christa, was born on 31 October 1936.

Her parents married in Bonn on 3 June 1933. The marriage was opposed by Wilhelm II because Dorothea's family was not regarded as equal under the dynastic rules of the former Prussian royal house. Wilhelm therefore relinquished his position as the first-born son of the German Crown Prince, leaving his younger brother Louis Ferdinand, Prince of Prussia as the prospective head of the family.

Wilhelm and Dorothea lived with their two daughters in Silesia. A photograph reproduced by Der Tagesspiegel shows Wilhelm with Dorothea and their daughters Felicitas and Christa in 1938. The photograph is part of the family photographs examined by historian Jörg Kirschstein in his research into Wilhelm's life.

Felicitas's childhood was marked by the death of her father during the Second World War. Wilhelm served as an officer in the Wehrmacht and was wounded during the German campaign in France. He died at Nivelles, Belgium, on 26 May 1940, aged 33, when Felicitas was five years old. Following the family's flight from Silesia, Felicitas grew up with her mother and younger sister in Bonn.

== Marriage and children ==
Felicitas married Dinnies Karl Friedrich von der Osten, son of Karl August von der Osten and Wilhelmine Gottliebe Jenny von Boddion, in September 1958. The civil ceremony took place at Bad Godesberg on 11 September, followed by a religious ceremony in Bonn on 12 September. Von der Osten was born at Köslin on 21 May 1929. He was the son of Karl August von der Osten and Wilhelmine Gottliebe Jenny von Boddion.

The couple had four children. Their eldest daughter, Friederike Thyra Marion Wilhelmine Dorothea, was born on 14 July 1959 at Bad Godesberg. Their eldest son, Dinnies Wilhelm Karl Alexander, was born on 15 February 1962, also at Bad Godesberg. Their second son, Hubertus Christoph Joachim Friedrich, was born on 5 May 1964 at Reinbek, while their youngest child, Cecilie Felicitas Katherina Sophie, was born on 12 March 1967 in Hamburg.

Felicitas and von der Osten divorced on 5 May 1972, after nearly fourteen years of marriage.

On 27 October 1972, Felicitas married for a second time, wedding Jörg Hartwig von Nostitz-Wallwitz at Aumühle. Von Nostitz-Wallwitz was born at Verden an der Aller on 26 September 1937. He was the son of General Gustav Adolf von Nostitz-Wallwitz and Renata Rachals. The couple had one daughter, Diana Renata Friederike von Nostitz-Wallwitz, who was born on 7 October 1974 in Hamburg. Diana married Carl-Jan von der Goltz in 2002 and together they have 2 sons.

== Career and interests ==
Felicitas took an interest in the history of the House of Hohenzollern and maintained a connection with Potsdam, the former royal residence of her family. She was particularly interested in the life of her grandmother, Crown Princess Cecilie, whom she had known personally. In May 2004, Felicitas attended the opening of an exhibition devoted to Cecilie at the Marmorpalais in Potsdam, organised by the Prussian Palaces and Gardens Foundation Berlin-Brandenburg. During the ceremony, she spoke about her personal memories of her grandmother, including her charitable activities in Berlin and Potsdam.

Felicitas was a regular visitor to Potsdam and continued to take part in events connected with her family's history. In August 2009, B.Z. recalled that she had opened the exhibition on her grandmother in 2004 and described how she entertained visitors with personal anecdotes about her family and her childhood as a great-granddaughter of Wilhelm II.

Outside her family connections, Felicitas lived a comparatively private life with her husband, Jörg von Nostitz-Wallwitz, in Wohltorf, Schleswig-Holstein. In a December 2004 profile, B.Z. described her as a member of a local brass ensemble, in which she performed at birthday celebrations. She also spoke about her preference for a modest domestic life, rather than the ceremonial existence associated with royalty.

== Death ==
Felicitas died on 1 August 2009 at her home in Wohltorf, Schleswig-Holstein, aged 75. Her death was announced on 4 August by a spokesman for the House of Hohenzollern, speaking on behalf of Georg Friedrich, Prince of Prussia. The announcement confirmed that she had died the previous Saturday. No cause of death was disclosed by the family.

Felicitas was buried at the Waldfriedhof Aumühle in Aumühle, in the Duchy of Lauenburg, alongside her eldest son, Dinnies Wilhelm Karl Alexander von der Osten, who had died in 1989, aged 27.

== Ancestry ==
Ancestors of Princess Felicitas of Prussia

8. Wilhelm II, German Emperor
4. Wilhelm, German Crown Prince
9. Augusta Victoria of Schleswig-Holstein
2. Prince Wilhelm of Prussia
10. Frederick Francis III, Grand Duke of Mecklenburg-Schwerin
5. Duchess Cecilie of Mecklenburg-Schwerin
11. Grand Duchess Anastasia Mikhailovna of Russia
1. Princess Felicitas of Prussia
12. Alexander von Salviati
6. Alexander Hermann Heinrich August von Salviati
13. Natalie von Arnim
3. Dorothea von Salviati
14. Rudolph Crasemann
7. Helene "Ella" Crasemann
15. Juliane Helene Köpcke
