= Prince Wilhelm of Prussia (1906–1940) =

Prussian prince and soldier (1906–1940)

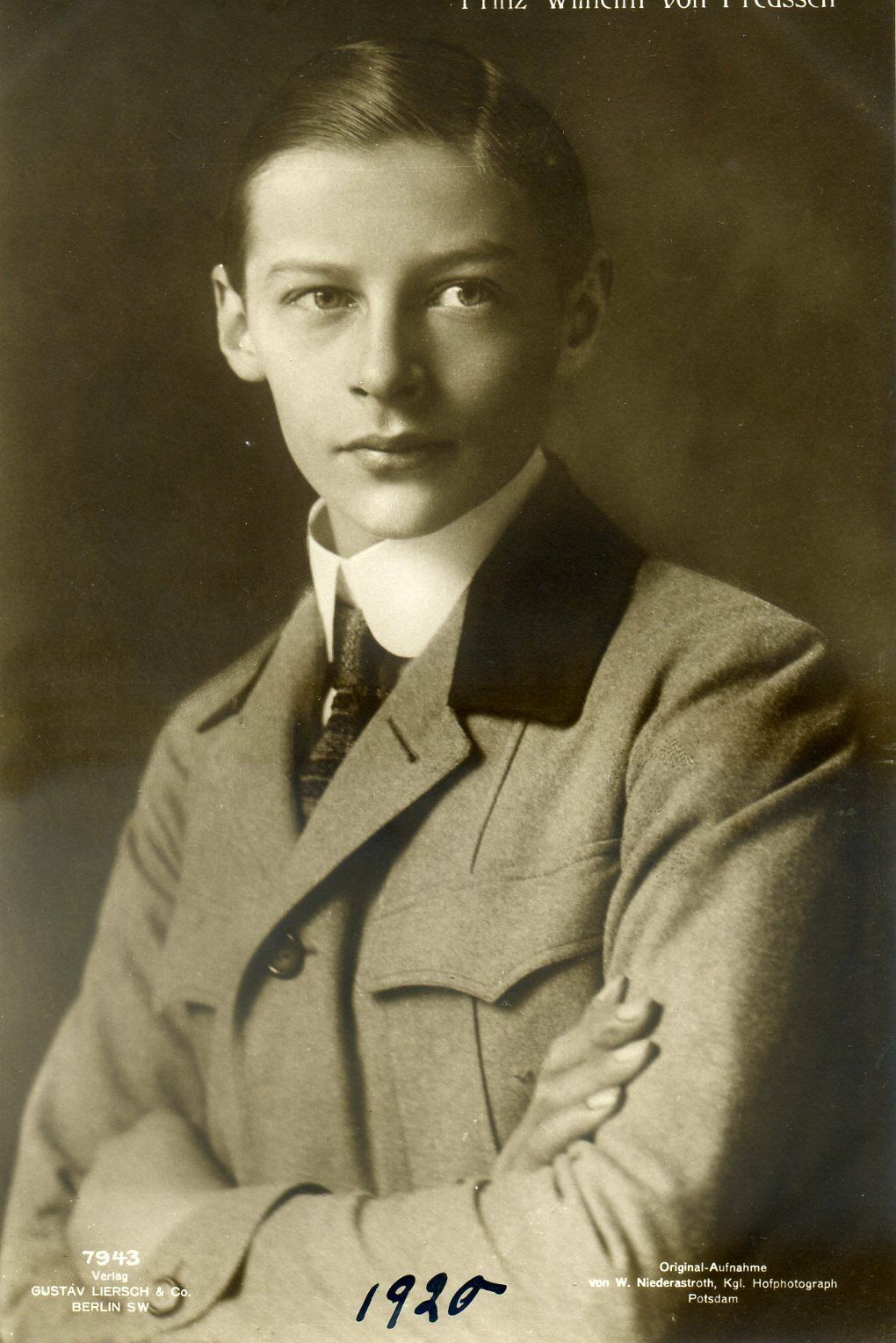
- Wilhelm in 1920
- Born: 4 July 1906; Marmorpalais, near Potsdam, Prussia
- Died: 26 May 1940 (aged 33); Nivelles, Belgium
- Burial: 29 May 1940; Antique Temple, Sanssouci Park, Potsdam, Nazi Germany
- Spouse: Dorothea von Salviati (m. 1933)
- Issue: Princess Felicitas; Princess Christa
Names
- William Frederick Francis Joseph Christian Olaf; German: Wilhelm Friedrich Franz Joseph Christian Olaf
- House: Hohenzollern
- Father: Wilhelm, German Crown Prince
- Mother: Duchess Cecilie of Mecklenburg-Schwerin

Prince Wilhelm Friedrich Franz Joseph Christian Olaf of Prussia (4 July 1906 – 26 May 1940) was the eldest child of Wilhelm, German Crown Prince, and Duchess Cecilie of Mecklenburg-Schwerin. At his birth, he was second in line to the German throne and was expected to succeed to the throne after the deaths of his grandfather, Emperor Wilhelm II, and his father, Crown Prince Wilhelm, although both outlived him. In any case, the German monarchy was abolished in 1918 when he was twelve. He later enlisted to serve in the Wehrmacht and died in active service during the German invasion of France in 1940.

== Early life and childhood ==
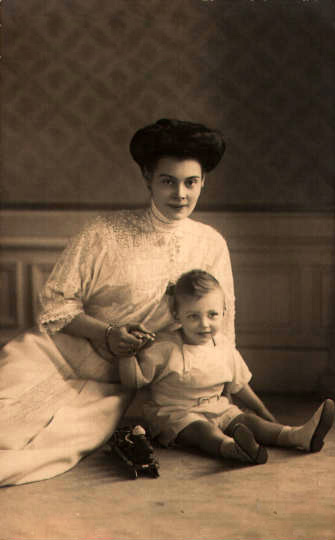
Prince Wilhelm with his mother, Crown Princess Cecilie, in 1908

Wilhelm was born on 4 July 1906 at the Hohenzollern family's private summer residence, Marmorpalais, or Marble Palace, near Potsdam, where his parents were residing until their own home, Schloss Cecilienhof, could be completed. His father was Crown Prince Wilhelm, the eldest son and heir to the German Emperor, Wilhelm II. His mother was Duchess Cecilie of Mecklenburg-Schwerin. Emperor Franz Joseph of Austria was one of the Prince's godfathers.

The selection of a nanny for Wilhelm and his younger brother, Louis Ferdinand (born in 1907) caused considerable distress within the family.

On his tenth birthday in 1916, Wilhelm was made a lieutenant in the 1st Guards Regiment, and was given the Order of the Black Eagle by his grandfather. Two years later, when he was twelve, the German monarchy was abolished. Wilhelm and his family remained in Germany, though his grandfather, the former Emperor, went into exile in the Netherlands. The former Crown Prince and his family remained in Potsdam, where Wilhelm and his younger brothers attended the local gymnasium.

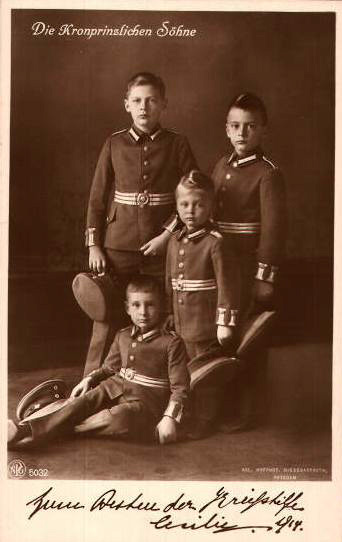
Prince Wilhelm in 1914, with his younger brothers, Louis Ferdinand, Hubertus and Friedrich. The boys are dressed in the uniform of the Prussian army.

After graduating from secondary school, Wilhelm went on to study at the University of Königsberg, the Ludwig-Maximilians-Universität München, and the University of Bonn. In 1926, while a student at the University of Bonn, Wilhelm joined the Borussia Corps, a student organization of which his father, grandfather, and other members of the Prussian royal family were members.

== Marriage and children ==
While a student at Bonn, Wilhelm fell in love with a fellow student, Dorothea von Salviati (10 September 1907 – 7 May 1972). Her parents were Alexander Hermann Heinrich August von Salviati and Helene "Ella" Crasemann (of the well-established Hamburg merchant family, Crasemann). Her maternal grandfather was the Hamburg parliamentarian Gustav August Rudolph Crasemann.

Wilhelm's grandfather did not approve of the marriage of the heir apparent to the German throne to a member of the minor nobility. At the time, the former Kaiser still believed in the possibility of a Hohenzollern restoration, and he would not permit his grandson to make an unequal marriage. Wilhelm told his grandson, "Remember, there is every possible form of horse. We are thoroughbreds, however, and when we conclude a marriage such as with Fräulein von Salviati, it produces mongrels, and that cannot be allowed to happen."

However, Wilhelm was determined to marry Dorothea. He renounced any rights to the succession for himself and his future children in 1933. Wilhelm and Dorothea married on 3 June 1933 in Bonn. They had two daughters. In 1940, the ex-Emperor recognized the marriage as dynastic and the girls were accorded the style of Princesses of Prussia (although their father was not restored to his former place in the putative line of succession, his renunciation of his rights remaining valid):

- Princess Felicitas Cecilie Alexandrine Helene Dorothea of Prussia (7 June 1934 – 1 August 2009), married Dinnies von der Osten (1929–1998, son of Karl August von der Osten and Wilhelmine von Boddion) on 12 September 1958, and they were divorced in 1972, with issue. She married secondly Jörg von Nostitz-Wallwitz (b. 1937), with issue.
- Princess Christa Friederike Alexandrine Viktoria of Prussia (born 31 October 1936), married Peter von Assis Liebes (1926–1967, son of Martin Liebes and Countess Clementine von Montgelas) on 24 March 1960, without issue.

== Military services ==
During the Weimar Republic, Wilhelm inadvertently caused a public scandal by attending Army manoeuvres in the uniform of the old Imperial First Foot Guards without first seeking government approval. The commander of the Reichswehr, Hans von Seeckt, was forced to resign as a result. The Oster conspiracy of 1938 sought to restore the monarchy with Wilhelm on the throne.

At the beginning of World War II, Wilhelm was among a number of princes from the former German monarchies who enlisted to serve in the Wehrmacht, the unified armed forces of Germany.

== Death and reaction ==
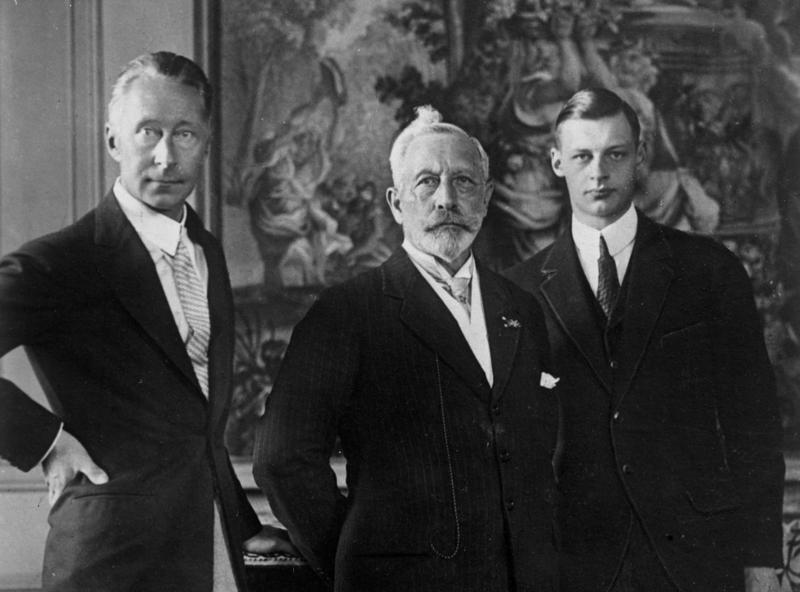
With his father and grandfather in 1927

In May 1940, Wilhelm took part in the invasion of France. He was wounded during the fighting in Valenciennes and died in a field hospital in Nivelles on 26 May 1940. His funeral service was held at the Church of Peace, and he was buried in the Hohenzollern family mausoleum in the Antique Temple in Sanssouci Park. The service drew over 50,000 mourners, by far the largest unofficial public turnout during Nazi rule in Germany.

Shortly after Wilhelm's death, a decree known as the Prinzenerlaß, or Prince's Decree, was issued, barring all members of the former German royal houses from service in the Wehrmacht.

== Ancestry ==
Ancestors of Prince Wilhelm of Prussia (1906–1940)

8. Frederick III, German Emperor
4. Wilhelm II, German Emperor
9. Victoria, Princess Royal
2. Wilhelm, German Crown Prince
10. Frederick VIII, Duke of Schleswig-Holstein
5. Princess Augusta Victoria of Schleswig-Holstein-Sonderburg-Augustenburg
11. Princess Adelheid of Hohenlohe-Langenburg
1. Prince Wilhelm of Prussia
12. Frederick Francis II, Grand Duke of Mecklenburg-Schwerin
6. Frederick Francis III, Grand Duke of Mecklenburg-Schwerin
13. Princess Augusta Reuss of Köstritz
3. Duchess Cecilie of Mecklenburg-Schwerin
14. Grand Duke Michael Nikolaevich of Russia
7. Grand Duchess Anastasia Mikhailovna of Russia
15. Princess Cecilie of Baden
