= Princess Christa of Prussia =

Prussian princess (born 1936)

- Princess of Prussia
- Born: 31 October 1936 (age 90); Schloss Klein Obisch, Lower Silesia, Nazi Germany
- Spouse: Peter von Assis Liebes (m. 1960; died 1967)
Names
- Christa Friederike Alexandrine Viktoria
- House: Hohenzollern
- Father: Prince Wilhelm of Prussia
- Mother: Dorothea von Salviati

Princess Christa Friederike Alexandrine Viktoria of Prussia (born 31 October 1936) is a German member of the House of Hohenzollern. She is the younger daughter of Prince Wilhelm of Prussia, eldest son of Crown Prince Wilhelm, and Dorothea von Salviati. She is also a great-granddaughter of German Emperor Wilhelm II, and his oldest living descendant.

== Early life and family ==
Christa Friederike Alexandrine Viktoria was born on 31 October 1936 at Schloss Klein Obisch in Silesia, then part of Germany. She was the second daughter of Prince Wilhelm of Prussia and Dorothea von Salviati, following her elder sister Felicitas, who was born in 1934. Through her father, Christa is a granddaughter of Wilhelm, German Crown Prince and a great-granddaughter of Kaiser Wilhelm II.

Her parents married in Bonn on 3 June 1933. The marriage was opposed by Wilhelm II because Dorothea's family was not regarded as equal under the dynastic rules of the former Prussian royal house. Wilhelm therefore relinquished his position as the first-born son of the German Crown Prince, leaving his younger brother Louis Ferdinand, Prince of Prussia as the prospective head of the family.

From 1935, Wilhelm and Dorothea lived with their two daughters at Schloss Klein Obisch near Glogau in Silesia. A photograph reproduced by Der Tagesspiegel shows Wilhelm with Dorothea and their daughters Christa and Felicitas in 1938. The photograph is associated with the family's surviving collections and is reproduced in connection with Jörg Kirschstein's research into Wilhelm's life.

Christa's childhood was marked by the death of her father during the Second World War. Wilhelm served as an officer in the Wehrmacht and was wounded during the Battle of France. He died at Nivelles, Belgium, on 26 May 1940, aged 33, when Christa was three years old. His death and the circumstances surrounding his marriage to Dorothea later became the subject of historical research that Christa herself helped to initiate.

== Marriage ==
Christa married Peter Paul Eduard Maria Clemens Maximilian Franz von Assis Liebes on 24 March 1960. The civil ceremony took place at Wahlscheid in the Siegkreis, while the religious ceremony was held at Auel in the same district. Liebes was born in Munich on 18 January 1926 and was the son of Martin Liebes and Countess Clementine von Montgelas.

Liebes studied law at Humboldt University of Berlin before working as a journalist for the Munich newspaper Neue Zeitung. He subsequently moved to the United States, where he received a Master of Arts degree from the University of Minnesota in 1955 for a thesis on the development of the press in post-war Germany. After returning to Germany, he joined Inter Nationes, a Bonn-based organisation involved in cultural relations with foreign countries, where he met Princess Christa.

Christa had previously rejected the advances of the Shah of Iran, Mohammad Reza Pahlavi. In 1959, following his divorce from Soraya Esfandiary-Bakhtiary, the Shah sent a marriage intermediary to approach her while she was holidaying at Wyk auf Föhr. Her relationship with Liebes prevented the proposed match. When Liebes subsequently sought her hand in marriage, Louis Ferdinand, Prince of Prussia, attempted to dissuade the couple or postpone the wedding. The marriage nevertheless proceeded without the participation of the Prussian royal family.

Following their marriage, Liebes briefly worked for the West German Foreign Office. He was appointed press officer at the German Consulate General in Bombay (now Mumbai), but was recalled following a request by the consul general, Heinrich Köhler. He subsequently worked for approximately six months in the Foreign Office's press department before his employment contract expired.

The couple rented a house at Finkenweg 2 in Ippendorf, near Bonn, where they became known for hosting social gatherings attended by diplomats, politicians, aristocrats and other prominent figures. Their guests included the Israeli ambassador Asher Ben-Natan, the German ambassador to Greece Oskar Schlitter and the vice-president of the Bundestag, Thomas Dehler. Despite their prominent social circle, the couple experienced financial difficulties and were occasionally supported by wealthy acquaintances.

The marriage was childless. Liebes died by suicide in Bonn on 5 May 1967, aged 41, after seven years of marriage. He was reportedly found dead in the bathtub by Christa at the couple's home in Ippendorf, having died from poisoning.

== Career and interests ==
Christa became involved in the art and antiques trade. In a 2016 interview with the Oberbayerisches Volksblatt (OVB), she described growing up surrounded by art and antiques and recalled operating her own antiques shop and trading business. She stated that she had worked successfully with Heinrich Graf von Spreti and the auction house Sotheby's. She also worked as an interior decorator, furnishing Sotheby's premises at Odeonsplatz 16 in Munich. She described this period as "beautiful times" and said that she continued to take an interest in art and the work of emerging artists while living more privately at Lake Tegernsee.

Her involvement in the art world also extended to charitable events. A 1993 account in Südwind listed Christa among those associated with Kunst contra AIDS, a benefit auction organised in cooperation with Sotheby's to raise funds for Münchner AIDS-Hilfe.

== Public life ==
=== Public life ===
In June 1978, Christa was the victim of an armed robbery while visiting Ireland. On 28 June, she was staying as a guest of Cecil and Renata Coleman at their home, Monte Alverno, in Dalkey, County Dublin, when masked men armed with machine guns entered the house during a dinner party and tied up Christa and the other guests. Her remaining family jewellery was stolen, including gold chains, necklaces, brooches and bracelets set with diamonds, sapphires and other precious stones. Christa subsequently valued the jewellery taken from her at 38,195 Deutsche marks, while her companion Hanns reported further losses of 3,900 marks. The stolen pieces, described as irreplaceable family heirlooms, were not recovered.

The robbery later became the subject of diplomatic correspondence. In November 1978, the German consul general in Bavaria, Liselotte Linnebach, appealed to Irish president Patrick Hillery for assistance with the insurance claim, noting that Christa had been reluctant to publicise the incident because of her affection for Ireland and concern that it might affect tourism and business relations. The relevant ambassadors had been informed and efforts were made to recover the financial loss through insurance. Renata Coleman later told The Irish Times that the robbery was believed to have involved the IRA, although the archival correspondence itself does not establish the perpetrators' identity.

Christa has occasionally appeared publicly in connection with the history of the House of Hohenzollern, particularly in relation to former royal residences in Berlin and the preservation of the family's historical legacy. In a 2011 interview with Der Tagesspiegel, she spoke about the Kronprinzenpalais and her family's connection to the area around the Friedrichswerder Church. She recalled stories told to her by her parents about the Palais, which had been a meeting place for artists and prominent figures during her family's residence there.

In the same interview, Christa discussed the reconstruction of the Berlin Palace and the planned Humboldt Forum. She welcomed the proposed public and museum-oriented use of the building, noting that it would not again function as a royal palace but could instead become a place accessible to the public and devoted to museums and cultural encounters. She also said that, although she had long lived in Bavaria, she could imagine having a residence in Berlin near the places associated with her family.

In September 2015, Christa attended the topping-out ceremony for the Kronprinzengärten, a residential development near the former Kronprinzenpalais in Berlin. She was presented at the event as a descendant of Wilhelm II and spoke about her personal connection to the area. The ceremony was attended by more than 200 guests from politics, business and the aristocracy.

Christa has also maintained a connection with places associated with her immediate family. In 2006, she and her sister Felicitas visited the Antikentempel in Sanssouci, where their father, Prince Wilhelm of Prussia, had been buried after his death in 1940. A photograph of the sisters at their father's burial place was later published in connection with material from the family's private collection.

=== Documentaries and historical work ===
Christa has appeared in television documentaries concerning the history of the House of Hohenzollern. In 2014, she was interviewed for the ZDF documentary Königliche Dynastien – Die Hohenzollern, part of the ZDFzeit series. The 45-minute programme traced the history of the Hohenzollern dynasty from its origins in the Middle Ages to the present. Its publicity specifically identified Christa, Georg Friedrich, Prince of Prussia and Friedrich Wilhelm, Prince of Prussia as descendants of the last German emperor who spoke about the history and fate of their ancestors. The programme was first broadcast on ZDF on 29 July 2014.

In October 2015, Christa was again identified as an interview participant in the ORF Universum History presentation of Königliche Dynastien – Die Hohenzollern. ORF's press material named her alongside Georg Friedrich and Friedrich Wilhelm as descendants of the former imperial family who spoke about their ancestors and the history of the Hohenzollern dynasty.

Her involvement with Hohenzollern history has also extended to historical research concerning her father. In 2025, Der Tagesspiegel reported that historian and archivist Jörg Kirschstein had originally been encouraged by Christa to investigate the life of Prince Wilhelm. She had approached Kirschstein years earlier and asked whether he could write a book about her father. Although he initially considered the project difficult because of the limited surviving sources, Christa continued to encourage him to pursue it.

Kirschstein's research eventually resulted in the biography Der Erbe des Kaisers – Prinz Wilhelm von Preußen (1906–1940). During his research he consulted family collections, including the archive at Hohenzollern Castle, which was made available to him by Georg Friedrich, Prince of Prussia. The research also drew upon photographs from Christa's personal collection, including images of her father and the family during the 1930s.

On 23 October 2025, Princess Christa of Prussia travelled from Tegernsee to Potsdam to attend the presentation of Der Erbe des Kaisers (The Emperor's Heir), the first biography of her father, Wilhelm, at the Potsdam Museum. The event was also attended by Georg Friedrich, Prince of Prussia, head of the House of Hohenzollern, and Friederike von Reiche, the eldest daughter of Felicitas von Nostitz (died 2009). The event was moderated by Markus Wicke, chairman of the museum's association.

== Ancestry ==
Ancestors of Princess Christa of Prussia

8. Wilhelm II, German Emperor
4. Wilhelm, German Crown Prince
9. Augusta Victoria of Schleswig-Holstein
2. Prince Wilhelm of Prussia
10. Frederick Francis III, Grand Duke of Mecklenburg-Schwerin
5. Duchess Cecilie of Mecklenburg-Schwerin
11. Grand Duchess Anastasia Mikhailovna of Russia
1. Princess Christa of Prussia
12. Alexander von Salviati
6. Alexander Hermann Heinrich August von Salviati
13. Natalie von Arnim
3. Dorothea von Salviati
14. Rudolph Crasemann
7. Helene "Ella" Crasemann
15. Juliane Helene Köpcke
