= Hohe Elbgeest =

- Amt
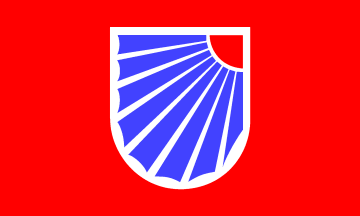
- Flag Coat of arms

- Map of Lauenburg highlighting Hohe Elbgeest
- Interactive map of Hohe Elbgeest
- Location within Germany Location within Schleswig-Holstein
- Coordinates: 53°29′N 10°22′E
- Country: Germany
- State: Schleswig-Holstein
- District: Lauenburg
- Seat: Dassendorf
- Subdivisions: 10 municipalities

Government
  - Mayor: Torge Sommerkorn

Area
  - Total: 116.9 km^{2} (45.1 sq mi)

Population (2025-12-31)
  - Total: 21,025
  - Density: 179.9/km^{2} (465.8/sq mi)
- Time zone: UTC+01:00 (CET)
  - Summer (DST): UTC+02:00 (CEST)
- Website: www.amt-hohe-elbgeest.de

Hohe Elbgeest is an Amt ("common administration for several smaller municipalities") in the district of Lauenburg, in Schleswig-Holstein, Germany. It is situated approximately 7 km north of Geesthacht, and 27 km east of Hamburg. Its seat is in Dassendorf.

In 2008, the Amt of Aumühle-Wohltorf was disbanded and its municipalities (Aumühle and Wohltorf) were folded into Hohe Elbgeest.

== Municipalities ==
The Amt Hohe Elbgeest consists of the following municipalities:

1. Aumühle
2. Börnsen
3. Dassendorf
4. Escheburg
5. Hamwarde
6. Hohenhorn
7. Kröppelshagen-Fahrendorf
8. Wiershop
9. Wohltorf
10. Worth
