= Schwarzenbek-Land =

- Amt
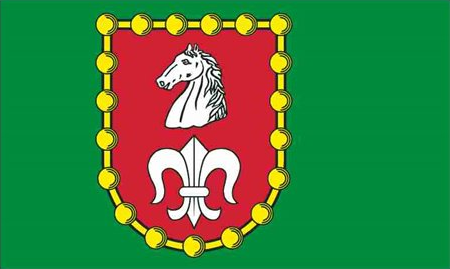
- Flag Coat of arms

- Map of Lauenburg highlighting Schwarzenbek-Land
- Interactive map of Schwarzenbek-Land
- Location within Germany Location within Schleswig-Holstein
- Coordinates: 53°33′N 10°30′E
- Country: Germany
- State: Schleswig-Holstein
- District: Lauenburg
- Seat: Schwarzenbek
- Subdivisions: 19 municipalities

Government
  - Mayor: Wolfgang Schmahl

Area
  - Total: 131.82 km^{2} (50.90 sq mi)

Population (2025-12-31)
  - Total: 10,097
  - Density: 76.597/km^{2} (198.38/sq mi)
- Time zone: UTC+01:00 (CET)
  - Summer (DST): UTC+02:00 (CEST)
- Website: amt-schwarzenbek-land.de

Schwarzenbek-Land is an Amt ("collective municipality") in the district of Lauenburg, in Schleswig-Holstein, Germany. It is situated around Schwarzenbek. Its seat is in Schwarzenbek, itself not part of the Amt.

The Amt Schwarzenbek-Land consists of the following municipalities:

1. Basthorst
2. Brunstorf
3. Dahmker
4. Elmenhorst
5. Fuhlenhagen
6. Grabau
7. Groß Pampau
8. Grove
9. Gülzow
10. Hamfelde
11. Havekost
12. Kankelau
13. Kasseburg
14. Kollow
15. Köthel
16. Kuddewörde
17. Möhnsen
18. Mühlenrade
19. Sahms
