= Postage stamps and postal history of Mecklenburg =

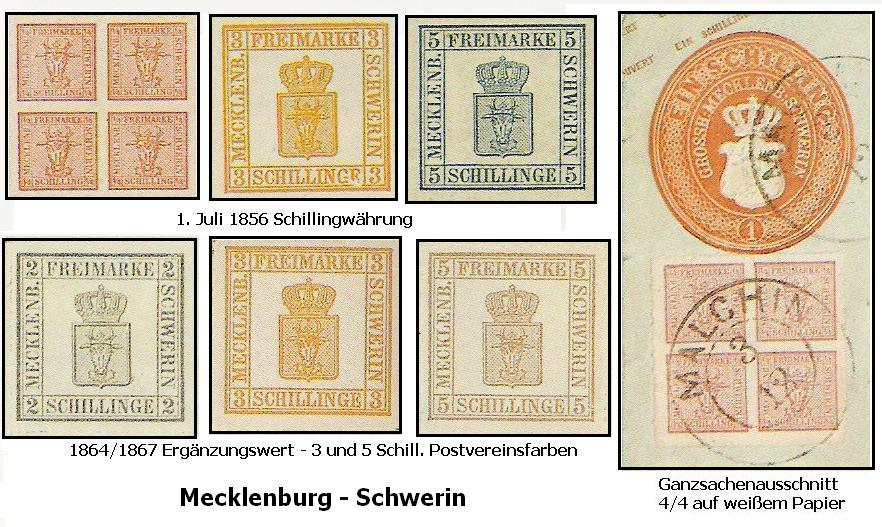
Stamps of Mecklenburg-Schwerin

By the Hamburg Agreement on 8 March 1701, Mecklenburg was separated into two duchies with limited autonomy, which formed a collective state–as of 1815, the Grand Duchies of Mecklenburg-Schwerin and Mecklenburg-Strelitz. Since 1755, they had the same constitution and were under the control of the same parliament. In 1815, both parts became Grand Duchies by the Congress of Vienna.

== Post ==
It was reported in 1644 that there was a first regular post between Schwerin and Rostock. In 1680, Mecklenburg's state posts were founded by the dukes Gustav Adolph, Duke of Mecklenburg-Güstrow (1633–1695) and Christian von Mecklenburg Schwerin (1658–1692). After some disputes, a postal association treaty between Prussia and Mecklenburg-Strelitz was signed on 22 June 1717. Hannover, called as a mediator, tried to seize the postal authority out of the dispute. Hannover closed the Prussian posts in Boitzenburg and Escheburg and constituted its own posts. The result was a dispute with Prussia.

When the foreign troops had left the country, Prussia established a post via Grabow to Parchim, with a connection to Mecklenburg's post in Plau. There was a connection to the line Berlin-Güstrow there, which had been established in 1713 via Ferbellin, Ruppin, and Wittstock.

In 1755, the postal constraint was introduced by an edict of Duke Christian Ludwig II (1683–1759). A new regulation was issued in 1759. It regulated the extra post and the courier system. A postage table for letters and records was issued in 1764. A postal regulation of 1770 prohibited the delivery of letters and parcels of less than 25 pounds. Until 1849, the postal system of Mecklenburg-Schwerin was administered by a chamber council. After 1 November 1849 a chief postal directorate, subordinate to the minister of finance, managed the post.

On 1 July 1850 both duchies joined the German-Austrian Postal Union.

== Mecklenburg-Schwerin ==
On 1 July 1855 stamps were introduced by Mecklenburg-Schwerin. Despite the different sizes of the stamps, they all had the same picture. Only the value of ¼ Schilling depicts the crowned head of a bull. All of the other stamps depict the country's great coat of arms with a crown, the inscription "FREIMARKE" (definitive stamp) above and "SCHILLINGE" below. On the vertical edges of the stamp, "MECKLENB" is inscribed on the left side and "SCHWERIN" on the right. The value of the stamps is indicated in the corners of the stamp. The postal stationery is provided with nearly round imprints of the values.

== Mecklenburg-Strelitz ==
In Mecklenburg-Strelitz, the postal system was still under the control of the chamber and forest council until the changeover to the administration of the North German Confederation.

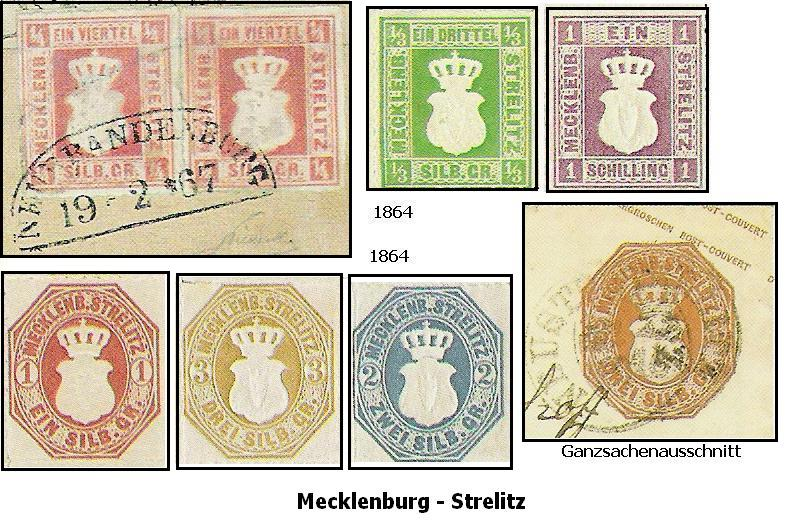
Stamps of Mecklenburg-Strelitz

Mecklenburg-Strelitz did not introduce stamps until 1864. The rectangular stamps were only intended for correspondence within the state. The value is inscribed above, the indication of the currency (Silbergroschen or Schilling) is at the bottom. On the vertical edges, "MECKLENB" is inscribed on the left side and "STRELITZ" on the right. For correspondence with other countries, the stamps were octagonal and in the colours of the postal union. Within the octagon, the inscription "MECKLENB.STRELITZ" is at the top, the value in numerals is in the centre, and the value in words, with the currency indication "SILB.GR.", is below. The value imprints of the postal stationeries corresponded to those of the stamps.
