= Philipp Jarnach =

German composer, pianist, teacher and conductor (1892–1982)

- Born: 26 July 1892; Noisy-le-Sec, France
- Died: 17 December 1982 (aged 90); Börnsen, West Germany
- Occupations: Composer, pianist
- Children: Franz Jarnach
- Relatives: Lucy Jarnach (granddaughter)

Philipp Jarnach (26 July 1892 – 17 December 1982 in Börnsen) was a German composer of contemporary music ("Neue Musik"), pianist, teacher, and conductor. Along with composers such as Hindemith, Jarnach is considered one of the leading and formative composers of the late German Romantic and early modern ("Neue Musik") eras.

Jarnach was born in Noisy-le-Sec, France, the son of a Spanish sculptor and a Flemish mother. Until 1914 he lived in Paris, where he studied piano under Édouard Risler and harmony under Albert Lavignac at the Conservatoire de Paris. During the First World War he was a student of Ferruccio Busoni in Zürich. He later completed the opera Doktor Faust, which Busoni had left unfinished on his death in 1924.

In the 1920s Jarnach worked in Berlin as a pianist, conductor and composer. In 1927 he became a teacher in composition at the Hochschule für Musik Köln. In 1949 he founded the Hamburger Musikhochschule (Hamburg Music Academy) which he directed until 1959 and at which he taught until 1970. His students included Ivan Rebroff (known as Hans Rolf Rippert at that time), Kurt Weill, Otto Luening, Wilhelm Maler, Bernd Alois Zimmermann, Jürg Baur, Walter Steffens, Colin Brumby, Eberhard Werdin and Nikos Skalkottas. In 1982, he died in Börnsen.

Jarnach composed a Sinfonia brevis, a prelude for large orchestra, a quartet and a quintet for strings, further chamber music, especially for violin and piano, and vocal works.

== Awards and achievements ==
- 1954: Bach Prize of the Free and Hanseatic City of Hamburg
- 1955: Member of the Academy of Arts, Berlin
- 1955: Berliner Kunstpreis
- Member of Freie Akademie der Künste in Hamburg
