= Kasseburg =

- Municipality
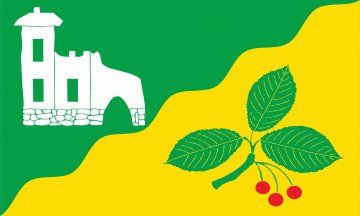
- Flag Coat of arms

- Location of Kasseburg within Herzogtum Lauenburg district
- Interactive map of Kasseburg
- Location within Germany Location within Schleswig-Holstein
- Coordinates: 53°34′2″N 10°24′59″E
- Country: Germany
- State: Schleswig-Holstein
- District: Herzogtum Lauenburg
- Municipal assoc.: Schwarzenbek-Land

Government
  - Mayor: Michaela Eickhoff

Area
  - Total: 7.89 km^{2} (3.05 sq mi)
- Elevation: 45 m (148 ft)

Population (2025-12-31)
  - Total: 593
  - Density: 75.2/km^{2} (195/sq mi)
- Time zone: UTC+01:00 (CET)
  - Summer (DST): UTC+02:00 (CEST)
- Postal codes: 22929
- Dialling codes: 04154
- Vehicle registration: RZ
- Website: www.amt-schwarzenbek-land.de

Kasseburg (German pronunciation: [ˈkasəbʊʁk]) is a municipality in the district of Lauenburg, in Schleswig-Holstein, Germany.
