= Wiershop =

- Municipality
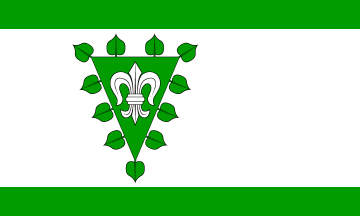
- Flag Coat of arms

- Location of Wiershop within Herzogtum Lauenburg district
- Interactive map of Wiershop
- Location within Germany Location within Schleswig-Holstein
- Coordinates: 53°26′N 10°27′E
- Country: Germany
- State: Schleswig-Holstein
- District: Herzogtum Lauenburg
- Municipal assoc.: Hohe Elbgeest

Government
  - Mayor: Hans-Ulrich Jahn

Area
  - Total: 5.15 km^{2} (1.99 sq mi)
- Elevation: 41 m (135 ft)

Population (2025-12-31)
  - Total: 218
  - Density: 42.3/km^{2} (110/sq mi)
- Time zone: UTC+01:00 (CET)
  - Summer (DST): UTC+02:00 (CEST)
- Postal codes: 21502
- Dialling codes: 04152
- Vehicle registration: RZ
- Website: www.amt-hohe- elbgeest.de

Wiershop is a municipality in the district of Lauenburg, in Schleswig-Holstein, Germany.
