= Hamfelde =

- Municipality
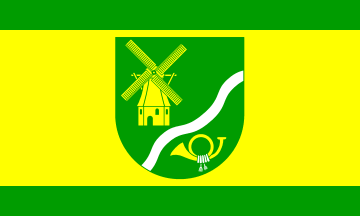
- Flag Coat of arms

- Location of Hamfelde within Herzogtum Lauenburg district
- Interactive map of Hamfelde
- Location within Germany Location within Schleswig-Holstein
- Coordinates: 53°35′49″N 10°26′53″E
- Country: Germany
- State: Schleswig-Holstein
- District: Herzogtum Lauenburg
- Municipal assoc.: Schwarzenbek-Land

Government
  - Mayor: Jürgen Spriestersbach

Area
  - Total: 3.47 km^{2} (1.34 sq mi)
- Elevation: 27 m (89 ft)

Population (2025-12-31)
  - Total: 527
  - Density: 152/km^{2} (393/sq mi)
- Time zone: UTC+01:00 (CET)
  - Summer (DST): UTC+02:00 (CEST)
- Postal codes: 22929
- Dialling codes: 04154
- Vehicle registration: RZ
- Website: www.amt- schwarzenbek-land.de

Hamfelde (German pronunciation: [hamˈfɛldə]) is a municipality in the district of Lauenburg, in Schleswig-Holstein, Germany.
