= Grove, Germany =

Grove
- Municipality
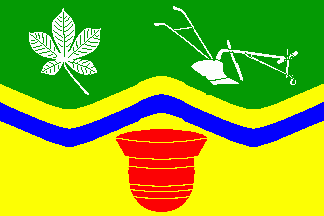
- Flag Coat of arms

- Location of Grove within Herzogtum Lauenburg district
- Interactive map of Grove
- Location within Germany Location within Schleswig-Holstein
- Coordinates: 53°31′50″N 10°29′41″E
- Country: Germany
- State: Schleswig-Holstein
- District: Herzogtum Lauenburg
- Municipal assoc.: Schwarzenbek-Land

Government
  - Mayor: Wolfgang Weber

Area
  - Total: 5.28 km^{2} (2.04 sq mi)
- Elevation: 39 m (128 ft)

Population (2025-12-31)
  - Total: 261
  - Density: 49.4/km^{2} (128/sq mi)
- Time zone: UTC+01:00 (CET)
  - Summer (DST): UTC+02:00 (CEST)
- Postal codes: 21493
- Dialling codes: 04151
- Vehicle registration: RZ
- Website: www.amt- schwarzenbek-land.de

Grove (German pronunciation: [ˈɡʁoːvə]) is a municipality in the district of Lauenburg, in Schleswig-Holstein, Germany.
