= Dahmker =

- Municipality
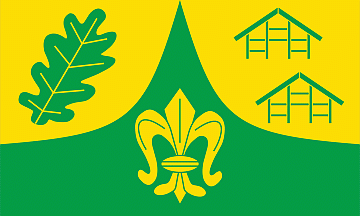
- Flag Coat of arms

- Location of Dahmker within Herzogtum Lauenburg district
- Interactive map of Dahmker
- Location within Germany Location within Schleswig-Holstein
- Coordinates: 53°35′13″N 10°26′44″E
- Country: Germany
- State: Schleswig-Holstein
- District: Herzogtum Lauenburg
- Municipal assoc.: Schwarzenbek-Land

Government
  - Mayor: Jens Husen

Area
  - Total: 2.04 km^{2} (0.79 sq mi)
- Elevation: 36 m (118 ft)

Population (2025-12-31)
  - Total: 153
  - Density: 75.0/km^{2} (194/sq mi)
- Time zone: UTC+01:00 (CET)
  - Summer (DST): UTC+02:00 (CEST)
- Postal codes: 22946
- Dialling codes: 04154
- Vehicle registration: RZ
- Website: www.amt-schwarzenbek-land.de

Dahmker (German pronunciation: [ˈdaːmkɐ]) is a municipality in the district of Lauenburg, in Schleswig-Holstein, Germany.
