= Kuddewörde =

- Municipality
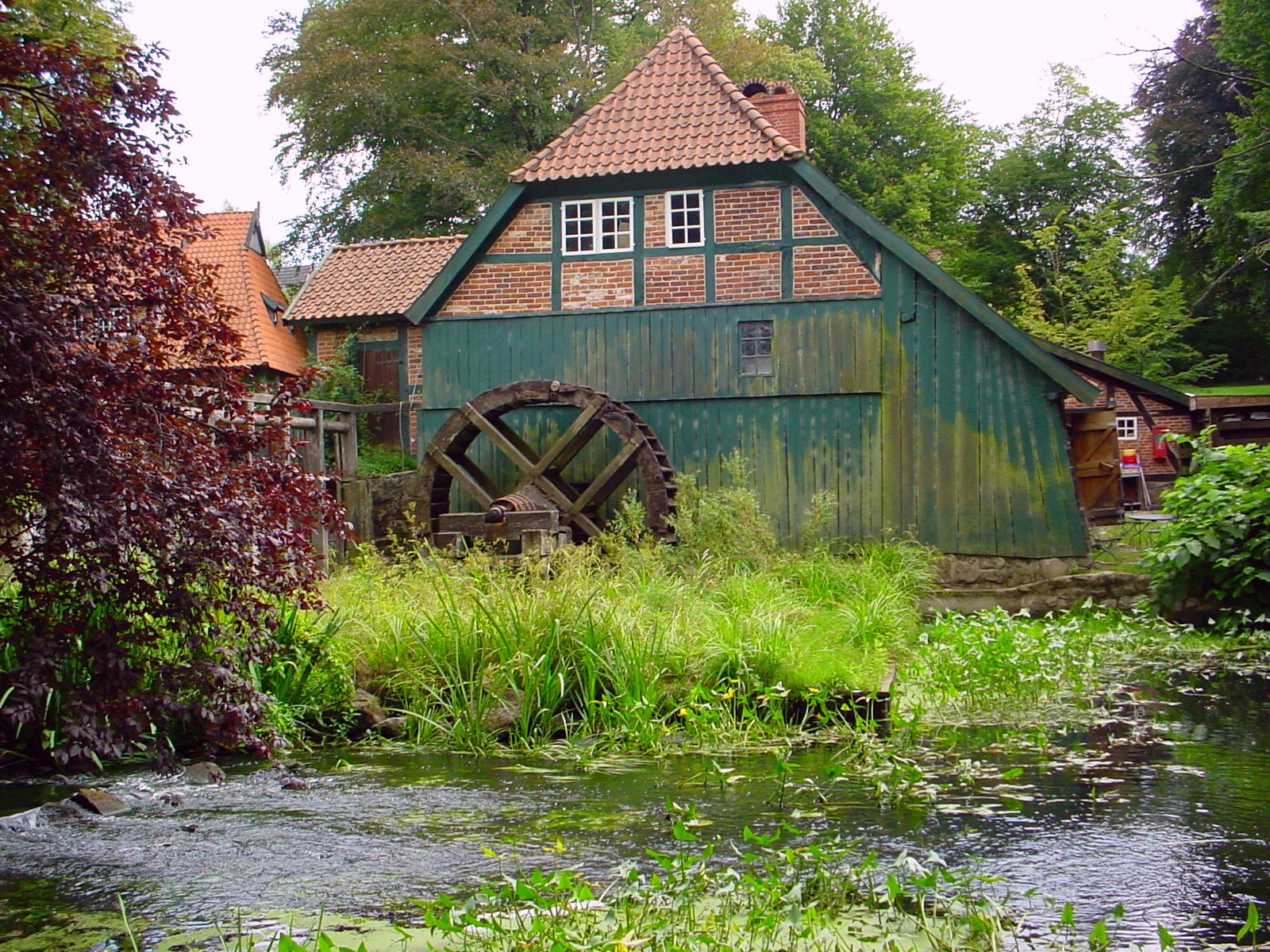

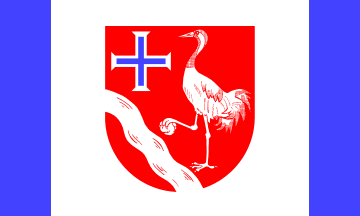
- Flag Coat of arms

- Location of Kuddewörde within Herzogtum Lauenburg district
- Interactive map of Kuddewörde
- Location within Germany Location within Schleswig-Holstein
- Coordinates: 53°34′N 10°23′E
- Country: Germany
- State: Schleswig-Holstein
- District: Herzogtum Lauenburg
- Municipal assoc.: Schwarzenbek-Land

Government
  - Mayor: Wolfgang Gerlach (CDU)

Area
  - Total: 7.34 km^{2} (2.83 sq mi)
- Elevation: 30 m (98 ft)

Population (2025-12-31)
  - Total: 1,703
  - Density: 232/km^{2} (601/sq mi)
- Time zone: UTC+01:00 (CET)
  - Summer (DST): UTC+02:00 (CEST)
- Postal codes: 22958
- Dialling codes: 04154
- Vehicle registration: RZ
- Website: www.amt- schwarzenbek-land.de

Kuddewörde (old Saxon: Kuthenworden) is a municipality in the district of Lauenburg, in Schleswig-Holstein, Germany. It is situated at the river Bille.

In 1230 Kuddewörde is mentioned in the records of the bishop of Ratzeburg.

Today Kuddewörde is composed of the former municipalities of Kuddewörde and Rotenbek (former Rothenbek), which was integrated into the municipality of Kuddewörde in 1936.

== Landmarks ==
- St. Andreaskirche, a church from the 13th century
- Grander Mühle, an ancient watermill dating back to 1303
