= Groß Pampau =

- Municipality
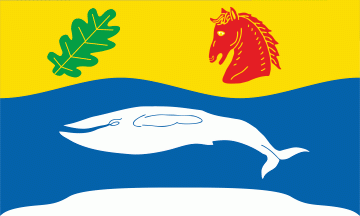
- Flag Coat of arms

- Location of Groß Pampau within Herzogtum Lauenburg district
- Interactive map of Groß Pampau
- Location within Germany Location within Schleswig-Holstein
- Coordinates: 53°31′28″N 10°33′52″E
- Country: Germany
- State: Schleswig-Holstein
- District: Herzogtum Lauenburg
- Municipal assoc.: Schwarzenbek-Land

Government
  - Mayor: Thomas Stich

Area
  - Total: 4.32 km^{2} (1.67 sq mi)
- Elevation: 24 m (79 ft)

Population (2025-12-31)
  - Total: 189
  - Density: 43.7/km^{2} (113/sq mi)
- Time zone: UTC+01:00 (CET)
  - Summer (DST): UTC+02:00 (CEST)
- Postal codes: 21493
- Dialling codes: 04151
- Vehicle registration: RZ
- Website: www.amt-schwarzenbek-land.de

Groß Pampau is a municipality in the district of Lauenburg, in Schleswig-Holstein, Germany.

== History ==
The village was first mentioned in a document in 1230 in the Ratzeburg tithe register. In the Lauenburg legend, Pampau is considered the birthplace of Till Eulenspiegel. On 1 April 1939 Groß Pampau was incorporated into Sahms, but regained independence after the Second World War and since then has been part of the Schwarzenbek-Land office.

== Landmarks ==
The gravel pit of the Kieswerke Ohle & Lau GmbH is known as the place where fossils and bed load were found. Just a few years after it was put into operation, it was a popular find spot for bed load collectors and also has a significant variety of residues from marine animals from the Miocene. Between 1984 and 1993 three skeletons of ten million year old whales from the Upper Middle Miocene were found and excavated here. These are now in the Museum for Nature and Environment in Lübeck and are open to the public. The baleen whale, discovered in 1989, was named Praemegaptera pampauensis (pampau whale) according to its location. In 2016, amateur paleontologists found an eleven million year old seal skeleton. According to their findings, the animals lived in the original North Sea.
