= Hamwarde =

- Municipality
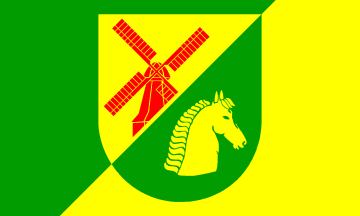
- Flag Coat of arms

- Location of Hamwarde within Herzogtum Lauenburg district
- Interactive map of Hamwarde
- Location within Germany Location within Schleswig-Holstein
- Coordinates: 53°27′N 10°25′E
- Country: Germany
- State: Schleswig-Holstein
- District: Herzogtum Lauenburg
- Municipal assoc.: Hohe Elbgeest

Government
  - Mayor: Friedrich-Wilhelm Richard (SPD)

Area
  - Total: 6.68 km^{2} (2.58 sq mi)
- Elevation: 49 m (161 ft)

Population (2025-12-31)
  - Total: 889
  - Density: 133/km^{2} (345/sq mi)
- Time zone: UTC+01:00 (CET)
  - Summer (DST): UTC+02:00 (CEST)
- Postal codes: 21502
- Dialling codes: 04152
- Vehicle registration: RZ
- Website: www.amt-hohe- elbgeest.de

Hamwarde is a municipality in the district of Lauenburg, in Schleswig-Holstein, Germany.

The town was an objective of, and was eventually captured by, the 2nd Bn, Gordon Highlanders, 227th Highland Brigade, part of the 15th (Scottish) Infantry Division during the operations to cross the River Elbe in April 1945.
