= Hajo Leschke =

German mathematical physicist (born 1945)

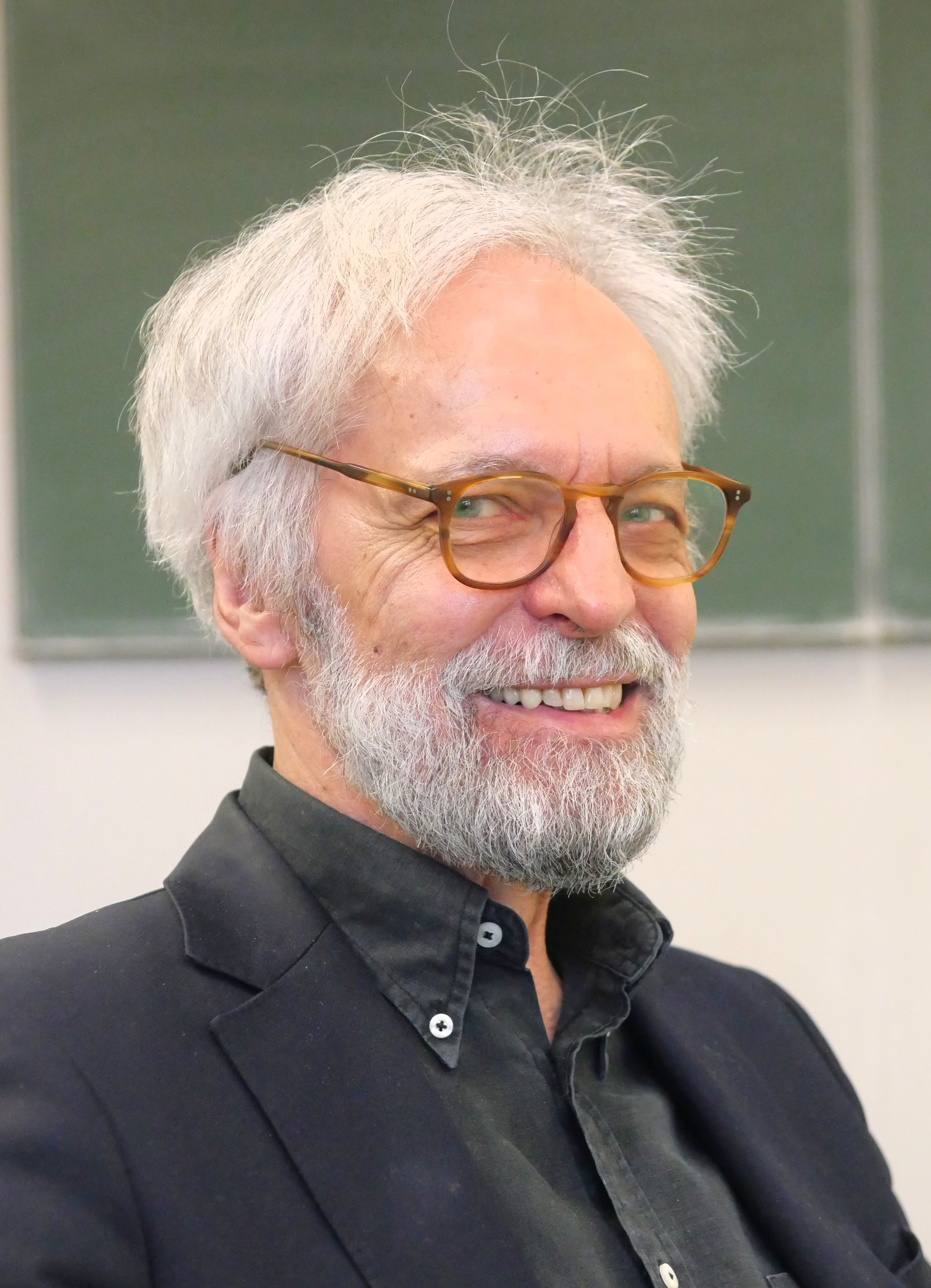
Hajo Leschke in 2023

Hajo Leschke (born 11 February 1945 in Wentorf bei Hamburg) is a German mathematical physicist and (semi-)retired professor of theoretical physics at the Friedrich Alexander University of Erlangen–Nuremberg (FAU). He is known for rigorous results on model systems in quantum (statistical) mechanics obtained through functional-analytic and probabilistic techniques, jointly with his (former) students and other co-workers. His research topics include: Peierls Transition, Functional Formulations of Quantum and Stochastic Dynamics, Pekar–Fröhlich Polaron, Quantum Spin Chains, Feynman–Kac Formulas, (Random) Schrödinger Operators, Landau-Level Broadening, Lifschitz Tails, Anderson Localization, Fermionic Entanglement Entropies, Quantum Spin Glasses.

== Academic education ==
Leschke studied physics and mathematics at the University of Hamburg and graduated with a diploma in physics (1970) under thesis advisor Wolfgang Kundt (born 1931). He received his doctorate in physics (1975) under dissertation advisor Uwe Brandt (1944–1997) from the Technical University of Dortmund, where he also earned the habilitation in physics (1981). His studies were supported by the Studienstiftung des deutschen Volkes (German Academic Scholarship Foundation) and the Kurt-Hartwig-Siemers–Wissenschaftspreis on the recommendation of Werner Döring (1911–2006) and of Pascual Jordan (1902–1980), respectively.

== Career ==
Leschke was a research (and teaching) assistant to Ludwig Tewordt (1926–2016) at the University of Hamburg, to Uwe Brandt at the Technical University of Dortmund, to Herbert Wagner (born 1935) at the Forschungszentrum Jülich (then: KFA Jülich), and to Richard Bausch (born 1935) at the Heinrich Heine University Düsseldorf (HHU) before he became a professor there in 1982 and at FAU in 1983. In 1987, he was a guest professor at the University of Georgia, Athens (UGA) with host David P. Landau (born 1941). In 2004, he organized the workshop "Mathematics and physics of disordered systems" jointly with Michael Baake, Werner Kirsch, and Leonid A. Pastur at the Oberwolfach Research Institute for Mathematics (MFO), Germany. In 2017, he organized the workshop "Fisher–Hartwig asymptotics, Szegő expansions, and applications to statistical physics" jointly with Alexander V. Sobolev and Wolfgang Spitzer at the American Institute of Mathematics (AIM), then located in San Jose, California. From 1998 to 2011, Leschke belonged to the advisory board of the Annalen der Physik, then edited by Ulrich Eckern (born 1952) at the University of Augsburg.

== Notable students ==
Notable doctoral students of Leschke include Peter Müller (born 1967) and Simone Warzel (born 1973). The first one is professor of mathematics at LMU Munich and dean of the Faculty of Mathematics, Informatics, and Statistics (2021–2025). The second one is professor of mathematics at the Technical University of Munich (TUM) in Garching near Munich.

== Research achievements ==
Leschke's research publications listed below all refer to properties of non-relativistic quantum systems which are modeled by some Hamiltonian, that is, by some self-adjoint operator on Hilbert space representing the total energy of the system, possibly depending on random variables simulating disorder. In the publications from 2000 to 2017 the Hamiltonian is of Schrödinger type, that is, an operator for the sum of the kinetic and potential energy of "point-like" particles in Euclidean space. The two publications with Kurt Broderix (1962–2000) extend previously known continuity properties of the corresponding one-parameter Schrödinger semigroup (or Gibbs operator for different temperatures) to rather general magnetic fields and to (random) potential fields possibly leading to unbounded semigroups; by suitably extending the Feynman–Kac formula and using the diamagnetic inequality. The other three publications from 2000 to 2004 consider the case of a single particle subject to a constant magnetic field and a random potential field. For a Poissonian field with positive single-impurity potential U the low-energy behavior of the integrated (or cumulative) density of states is derived, depending on the range of U. For a Gaussian random field (without an underlying lattice structure) the first proofs are given for the existence of the density of states and of Anderson localization in multidimensional continuous space. The publications in 2014 and 2017 refer to the case of many non-interacting particles which obey Fermi–Dirac statistics. For the corresponding ideal Fermi gas in thermodynamic equilibrium they contain the first rigorous results on the asymptotic growth of its quantum Rényi entropies of (spatial) entanglement at arbitrary temperature. These results have served as a standard of comparison for approximate arguments and/or numerical methods to better understand the correlations in many-fermion systems with interaction. The publications in 2021 are among the first ones providing rigorous results on quantum versions of the classic(al) Sherrington–Kirkpatrick spin-glass model. In particular, they prove for the first time the existence of a phase transition (related to spontaneous replica-symmetry breaking) if the temperature and the strength of the "transverse" magnetic field are low enough. The publication in 2023 illuminates this phase transition's relevance to the quantum-annealing algorithm in computer science.

== Selected publications since 2000 ==
- Chakrabarti, B.K.; Leschke, H.; Ray, P.; Shirai, T.; Tanaka, S. (2023). "Quantum annealing and computation: challenges and perspectives (Editors' introduction to the Theme Issue 2241)". Philosophical Transactions. Series A, Mathematical, Physical, and Engineering Sciences. 381 (2241) 20210419: 5pp. doi:10.1098/rsta.2021.0419. PMC 9719792. PMID 36463926.
- Leschke, H.; Manai, C.; Ruder, R.; Warzel, S. (2021). "Existence of replica-symmetry breaking in quantum glasses". Physical Review Letters. 127 (20) 207204: 6pp. arXiv:2106.00500. Bibcode:2021PhRvL.127t7204L. doi:10.1103/PhysRevLett.127.207204. PMID 34860058.
- Leschke, H.; Rothlauf, S.; Ruder, R.; Spitzer, W. (2021). "The Free Energy of a Quantum Sherrington–Kirkpatrick Spin-Glass Model for Weak Disorder". Journal of Statistical Physics. 182 (3) 55: 41pp. arXiv:1912.06633. Bibcode:2021JSP...182...55L. doi:10.1007/s10955-020-02689-8.
- Leschke, H.; Sobolev, A.V.; Spitzer, W. (2017). "Trace formulas for Wiener-Hopf operators with applications to entropies of free fermionic equilibrium states". Journal of Functional Analysis. 273 (3): 1049–1094. arXiv:1605.04429. doi:10.1016/j.jfa.2017.04.005.
- Leschke, H.; Sobolev, A.V.; Spitzer, W. (2014). "Scaling of Rényi entanglement entropies of the free Fermi-gas ground state: a rigorous proof". Physical Review Letters. 112 (16) 160403: 5pp. arXiv:1312.6828. Bibcode:2014PhRvL.112p0403L. doi:10.1103/PhysRevLett.112.160403. PMID 24815626.
- Broderix, K.; Leschke, H.; Müller, P. (2004). "Continuous integral kernels for unbounded Schrödinger semigroups and their spectral projections". Journal of Functional Analysis. 212 (2): 287–323. arXiv:math-ph/0209020. doi:10.1016/j.jfa.2004.01.009.
- Leschke, H.; Warzel, S. (2004). "Quantum-classical transitions in Lifshitz tails with magnetic fields". Physical Review Letters. 92 (8) 086402: 4pp. arXiv:cond-mat/0310389. Bibcode:2004PhRvL..92h6402L. doi:10.1103/PhysRevLett.92.086402. PMID 14995799.
- Hupfer, T.; Leschke, H.; Müller, P.; Warzel, S. (2001). "The Absolute Continuity of the Integrated Density of States for Magnetic Schrödinger Operators with Certain Unbounded Random Potentials". Communications in Mathematical Physics. 221 (2): 229–254. arXiv:math-ph/0105046. Bibcode:2001CMaPh.221..229H. doi:10.1007/s002200100467.
- Fischer, W.; Leschke, H.; Müller, P. (2000). "Spectral localization by Gaussian random potentials in multi-dimensional continuous space". Journal of Statistical Physics. 101 (5/6): 935–985. arXiv:math-ph/9912025. Bibcode:2000JSP...101..935F. doi:10.1023/A:1026425621261.
- Broderix, K.; Hundertmark, D.; Leschke, H. (2000). "Continuity properties of Schrödinger semigroups with magnetic fields". Reviews in Mathematical Physics. 12 (2): 181–225. arXiv:math-ph/9808004. Bibcode:2000RvMaP..12..181B. doi:10.1142/S0129055X00000083.
