= Kankelau =

- Municipality
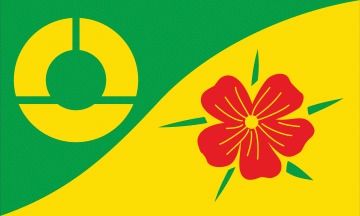
- Flag Coat of arms

- Location of Kankelau within Herzogtum Lauenburg district
- Interactive map of Kankelau
- Location within Germany Location within Schleswig-Holstein
- Coordinates: 53°32′59″N 10°34′4″E
- Country: Germany
- State: Schleswig-Holstein
- District: Herzogtum Lauenburg
- Municipal assoc.: Schwarzenbek-Land

Government
  - Mayor: Klaus Hansen

Area
  - Total: 4.21 km^{2} (1.63 sq mi)
- Elevation: 38 m (125 ft)

Population (2025-12-31)
  - Total: 212
  - Density: 50.4/km^{2} (130/sq mi)
- Time zone: UTC+01:00 (CET)
  - Summer (DST): UTC+02:00 (CEST)
- Postal codes: 21514
- Dialling codes: 04156
- Vehicle registration: RZ
- Website: www.amt-schwarzenbek-land.de

Kankelau (German pronunciation: [ˈkaŋkəlaʊ]) is a municipality in the district of Lauenburg, in Schleswig-Holstein, Germany. The village was first mentioned in 1230 AD as "Cankelowe" (meaning: settlement in the corn cockles), the spelling later changed to Kankelowe (1278), Kankelow (1434), and Kankelauw (1450).
