= Mühlenrade =

- Municipality
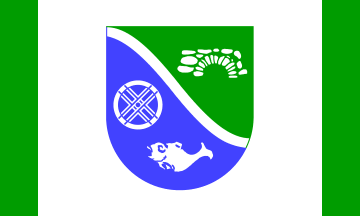
- Flag Coat of arms

- Location of Mühlenrade within Herzogtum Lauenburg district
- Interactive map of Mühlenrade
- Location within Germany Location within Schleswig-Holstein
- Coordinates: 53°35′44″N 10°29′14″E
- Country: Germany
- State: Schleswig-Holstein
- District: Herzogtum Lauenburg
- Municipal assoc.: Schwarzenbek-Land

Government
  - Mayor: Maria Jodies

Area
  - Total: 3.74 km^{2} (1.44 sq mi)
- Elevation: 43 m (141 ft)

Population (2025-12-31)
  - Total: 215
  - Density: 57.5/km^{2} (149/sq mi)
- Time zone: UTC+01:00 (CET)
  - Summer (DST): UTC+02:00 (CEST)
- Postal codes: 21493
- Dialling codes: 04159
- Vehicle registration: RZ
- Website: www.amt- schwarzenbek-land.de

Mühlenrade is a municipality in the district of Lauenburg, in Schleswig-Holstein, Germany.
