= Simone Warzel =

German mathematical physicist

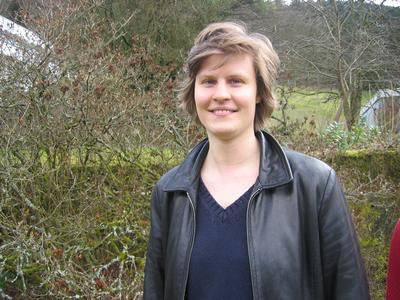
Warzel at Oberwolfach, 2007

Simone Warzel (born 1973) is a German mathematical physicist at the Technical University of Munich. Her research involves statistical mechanics and the many-body problem in quantum mechanics. She is a co-author of the book Random Operators: Disorder Effects on Quantum Spectra and Dynamics.

== Education and career ==
Warzel was born on 2 February 1973 in Erlangen, where she grew up. She studied mathematics and physics at the University of Erlangen-Nuremberg, beginning in 1992, with a year at the University of Cambridge for Part III of the Mathematical Tripos. She earned her doctorate (Dr. rer. nat.) from the University of Erlangen-Nuremberg in 2001. Her dissertation, On Lifshits Tails in Magnetic Fields, was supervised by Hajo Leschke.

Before joining the Technical University of Munich, she was an assistant professor at Princeton University.

== Research ==
Her research interests involve statistical mechanics and the many-body problem in quantum mechanics. She is the author with Michael Aizenman of the book Random Operators: Disorder Effects on Quantum Spectra and Dynamics.

== Recognition ==
In 2009, the International Union of Pure and Applied Physics gave Warzel their Young Scientist Prize in Mathematical Physics. Warzel is a Sloan Research Fellow, and a former von Neumann Fellow at the Institute for Advanced Study.

She was the Emmy Noether Lecturer of the German Mathematical Society in 2011, a plenary speaker at the 2012 International Congress on Mathematical Physics, and a speaker in the mathematical physics section of the 2018 International Congress of Mathematicians in Brazil.

Warzel was elected chair of the IUPAP Commission on Mathematical Physics (C18) in October 2024 for the period 2025–2027.
