= Worth, Schleswig-Holstein =

Worth
- Municipality
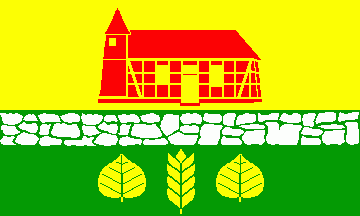
- Flag Coat of arms

- Location of Worth within Herzogtum Lauenburg district
- Interactive map of Worth
- Location within Germany Location within Schleswig-Holstein
- Coordinates: 53°28′03″N 10°24′40″E
- Country: Germany
- State: Schleswig-Holstein
- District: Herzogtum Lauenburg
- Municipal assoc.: Hohe Elbgeest

Government
  - Mayor: Uwe Schack

Area
  - Total: 6.07 km^{2} (2.34 sq mi)
- Elevation: 45 m (148 ft)

Population (2025-12-31)
  - Total: 172
  - Density: 28.3/km^{2} (73.4/sq mi)
- Time zone: UTC+01:00 (CET)
  - Summer (DST): UTC+02:00 (CEST)
- Postal codes: 21502
- Dialling codes: 04152
- Vehicle registration: RZ
- Website: www.amt-hohe- elbgeest.de

Worth is a municipality in the district of Lauenburg, in Schleswig-Holstein, Germany.
