= Elmenhorst, Lauenburg =

Elmenhorst
- Municipality
- Coat of arms

- Location of Elmenhorst within Herzogtum Lauenburg district
- Interactive map of Elmenhorst
- Location within Germany Location within Schleswig-Holstein
- Coordinates: 53°32′N 10°31′E
- Country: Germany
- State: Schleswig-Holstein
- District: Herzogtum Lauenburg
- Municipal assoc.: Schwarzenbek-Land

Government
  - Mayor: Richard Hamester

Area
  - Total: 12.99 km^{2} (5.02 sq mi)
- Elevation: 47 m (154 ft)

Population (2025-12-31)
  - Total: 866
  - Density: 66.7/km^{2} (173/sq mi)
- Time zone: UTC+01:00 (CET)
  - Summer (DST): UTC+02:00 (CEST)
- Postal codes: 21493
- Dialling codes: 04151, 04156
- Vehicle registration: RZ
- Website: www.amt-schwarzenbek-land.de

Elmenhorst (German pronunciation: [ˈɛlmənhɔʁst]) is a municipality in the district of Lauenburg, in Schleswig-Holstein, Germany.
