= Möhnsen =

- Municipality
- Coat of arms

- Location of Möhnsen within Herzogtum Lauenburg district
- Interactive map of Möhnsen
- Location within Germany Location within Schleswig-Holstein
- Coordinates: 53°33′36″N 10°28′7″E
- Country: Germany
- State: Schleswig-Holstein
- District: Herzogtum Lauenburg
- Municipal assoc.: Schwarzenbek-Land

Government
  - Mayor: Lisa Patzker

Area
  - Total: 7.48 km^{2} (2.89 sq mi)
- Elevation: 48 m (157 ft)

Population (2025-12-31)
  - Total: 533
  - Density: 71.3/km^{2} (185/sq mi)
- Time zone: UTC+01:00 (CET)
  - Summer (DST): UTC+02:00 (CEST)
- Postal codes: 21493
- Dialling codes: 04159
- Vehicle registration: RZ
- Website: www.amt-schwarzenbek-land.de

Möhnsen is a municipality in the district of Lauenburg, in Schleswig-Holstein, Germany.
