= Kollow =

- Municipality
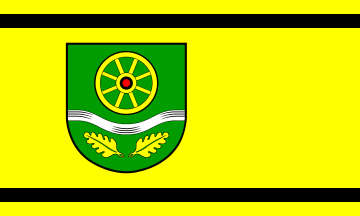
- Flag Coat of arms

- Location of Kollow within Herzogtum Lauenburg district
- Interactive map of Kollow
- Location within Germany Location within Schleswig-Holstein
- Coordinates: 53°27′49″N 10°27′35″E
- Country: Germany
- State: Schleswig-Holstein
- District: Herzogtum Lauenburg
- Municipal assoc.: Schwarzenbek-Land

Government
  - Mayor: Andreas Koop

Area
  - Total: 8.21 km^{2} (3.17 sq mi)
- Elevation: 41 m (135 ft)

Population (2025-12-31)
  - Total: 599
  - Density: 73.0/km^{2} (189/sq mi)
- Time zone: UTC+01:00 (CET)
  - Summer (DST): UTC+02:00 (CEST)
- Postal codes: 21527
- Dialling codes: 04151
- Vehicle registration: RZ
- Website: www.amt- schwarzenbek-land.de

Kollow is a municipality in the district of Lauenburg, in Schleswig-Holstein, Germany.
