= Crasemann =

Crasemann is a German surname. Notable people with the surname include:

- Eduard Crasemann (1891–1950), German Wehrmacht general
- Rudolph Crasemann (1841–1929), German businessman and politician
