= Brunstorf =

- Municipality
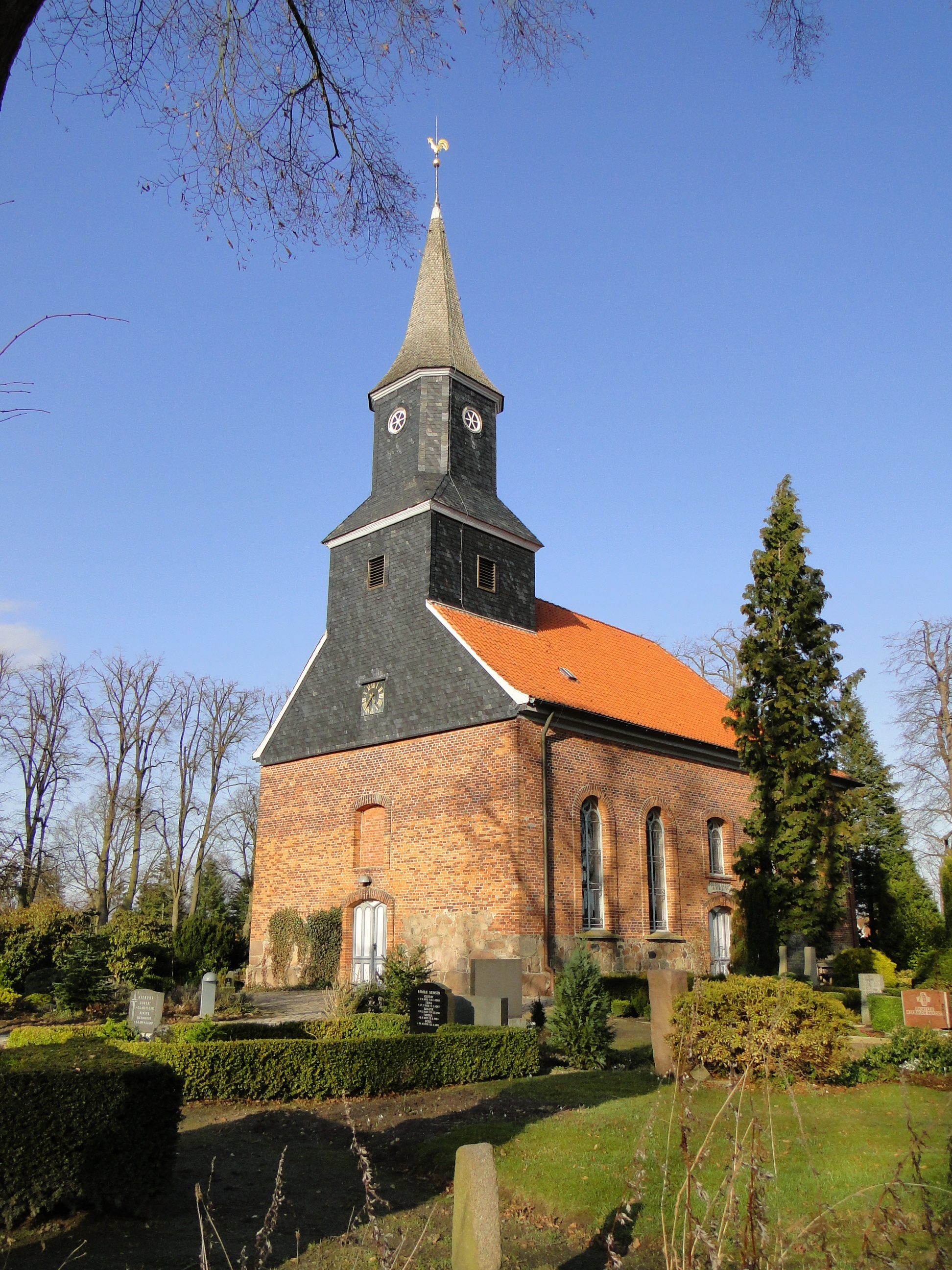
- Brunstorf Church

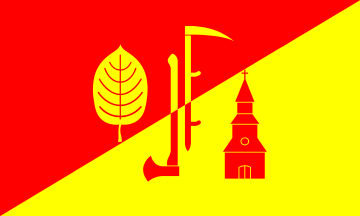
- Flag Coat of arms

- Location of Brunstorf within Herzogtum Lauenburg district
- Interactive map of Brunstorf
- Location within Germany Location within Schleswig-Holstein
- Coordinates: 53°29′34″N 10°25′31″E
- Country: Germany
- State: Schleswig-Holstein
- District: Herzogtum Lauenburg
- Municipal assoc.: Schwarzenbek-Land

Government
  - Mayor: Claus Nesemann

Area
  - Total: 13.76 km^{2} (5.31 sq mi)
- Elevation: 47 m (154 ft)

Population (2025-12-31)
  - Total: 780
  - Density: 57/km^{2} (150/sq mi)
- Time zone: UTC+01:00 (CET)
  - Summer (DST): UTC+02:00 (CEST)
- Postal codes: 21524
- Dialling codes: 04151
- Vehicle registration: RZ
- Website: www.brunstorf.info

Brunstorf is a municipality in the district of Lauenburg, in Schleswig-Holstein, Germany.
