= Havekost =

- Municipality
- Location of Havekost within Herzogtum Lauenburg district
- Interactive map of Havekost
- Location within Germany Location within Schleswig-Holstein
- Coordinates: 53°32′29″N 10°28′34″E
- Country: Germany
- State: Schleswig-Holstein
- District: Herzogtum Lauenburg
- Municipal assoc.: Schwarzenbek-Land

Government
  - Mayor: Markus Nickel

Area
  - Total: 5.91 km^{2} (2.28 sq mi)
- Elevation: 44 m (144 ft)

Population (2025-12-31)
  - Total: 200
  - Density: 34/km^{2} (88/sq mi)
- Time zone: UTC+01:00 (CET)
  - Summer (DST): UTC+02:00 (CEST)
- Postal codes: 21493
- Dialling codes: 04151
- Vehicle registration: RZ
- Website: www.amt-schwarzenbek-land.de

Havekost is a municipality in the district of Lauenburg, in Schleswig-Holstein, Germany.
