= Fuhlenhagen =

- Municipality
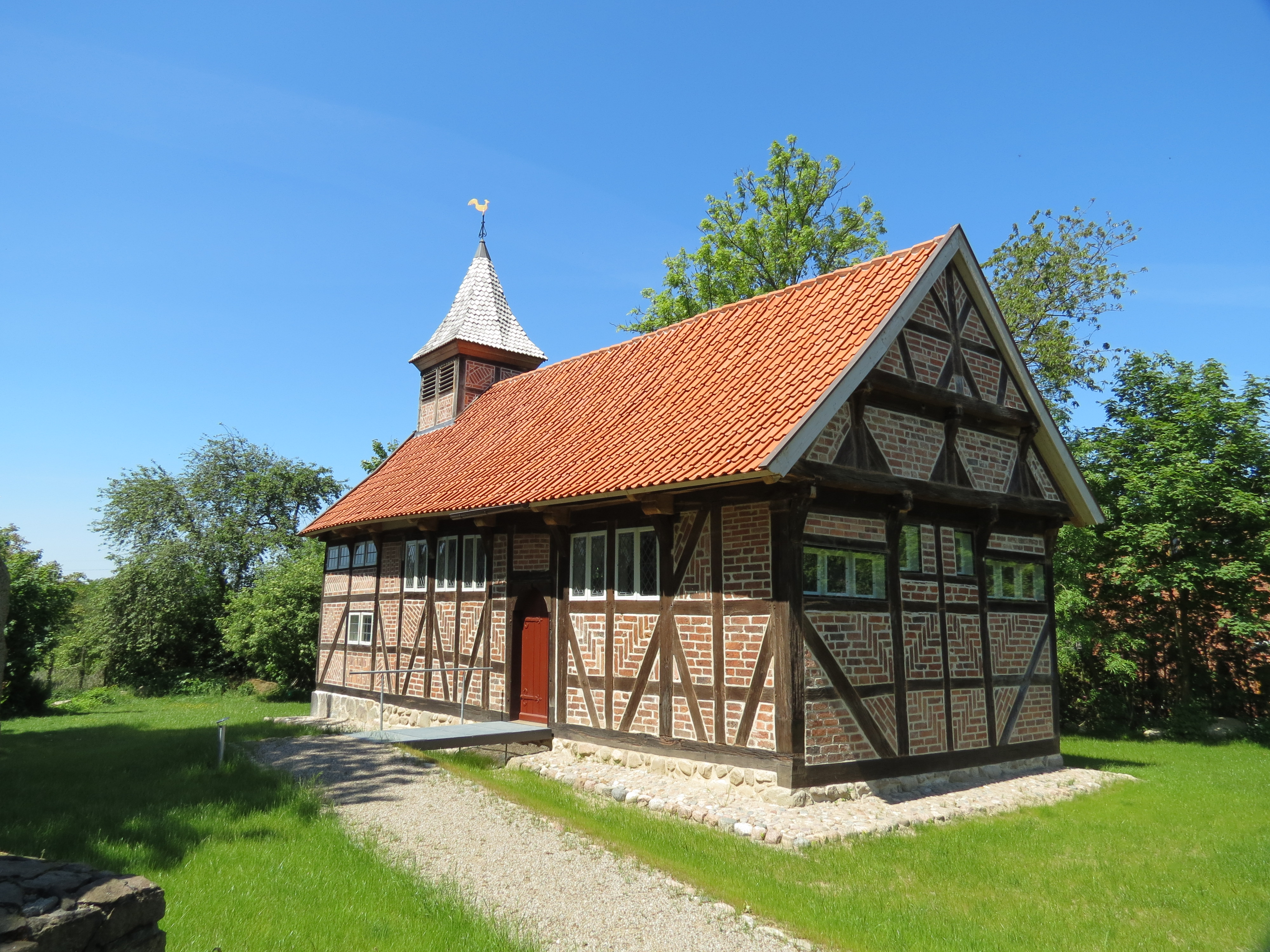

- Coat of arms

- Location of Fuhlenhagen within Herzogtum Lauenburg district
- Interactive map of Fuhlenhagen
- Location within Germany Location within Schleswig-Holstein
- Coordinates: 53°34′25″N 10°31′41″E
- Country: Germany
- State: Schleswig-Holstein
- District: Herzogtum Lauenburg
- Municipal assoc.: Schwarzenbek-Land

Government
  - Mayor: Wolfgang Krüger

Area
  - Total: 5.74 km^{2} (2.22 sq mi)
- Elevation: 46 m (151 ft)

Population (2025-12-31)
  - Total: 376
  - Density: 65.5/km^{2} (170/sq mi)
- Time zone: UTC+01:00 (CET)
  - Summer (DST): UTC+02:00 (CEST)
- Postal codes: 21493
- Dialling codes: 04156
- Vehicle registration: RZ
- Website: www.amt-schwarzenbek-land.de

Fuhlenhagen is a municipality in the district of Lauenburg, in Schleswig-Holstein, Germany.
