= Basthorst =

- Municipality
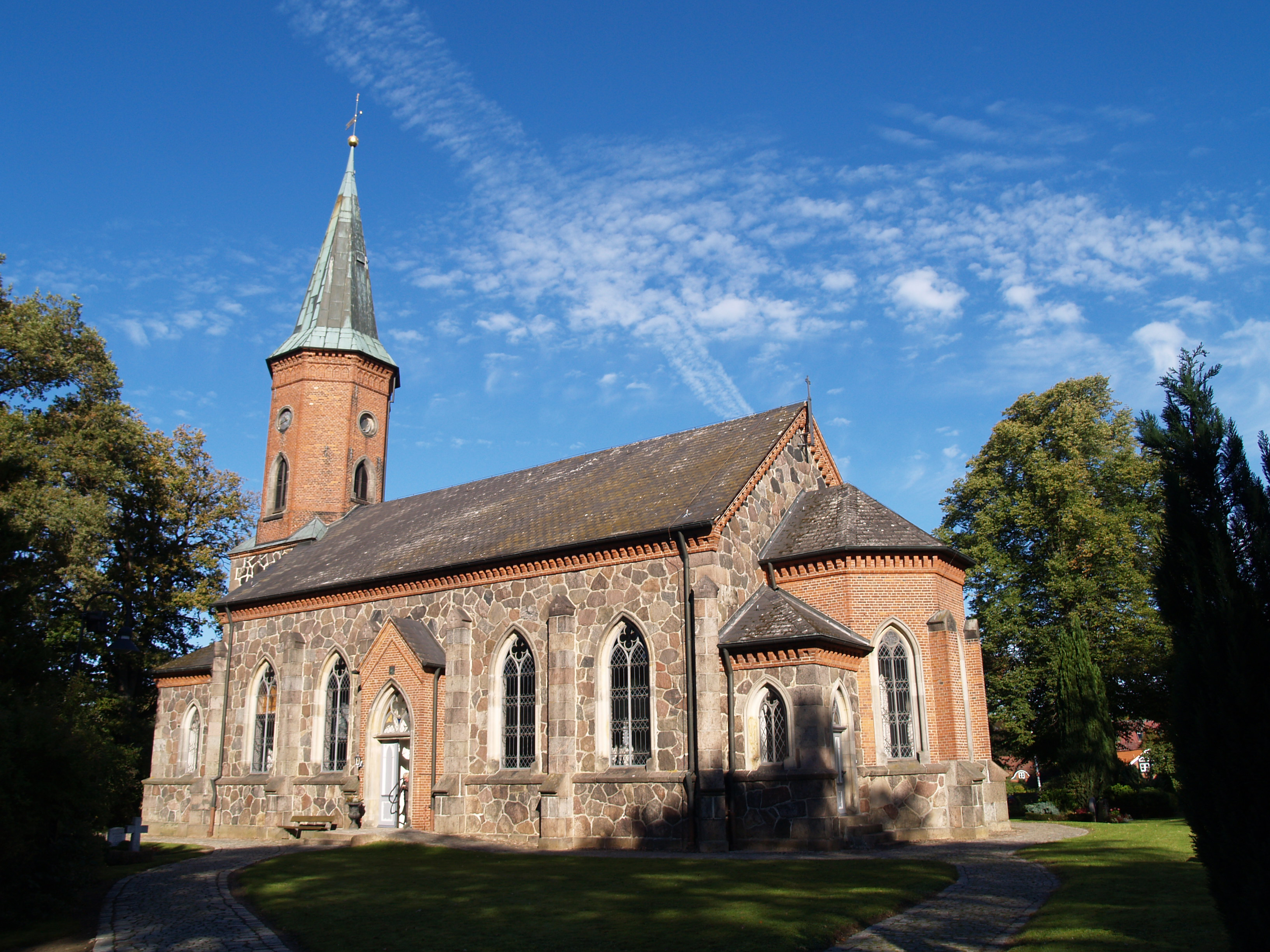

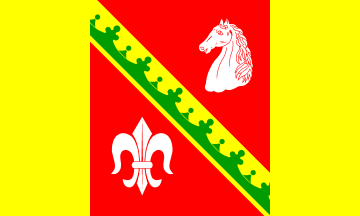
- Flag Coat of arms

- Location of Basthorst within Herzogtum Lauenburg district
- Interactive map of Basthorst
- Location within Germany Location within Schleswig-Holstein
- Coordinates: 53°34′40″N 10°28′17″E
- Country: Germany
- State: Schleswig-Holstein
- District: Herzogtum Lauenburg
- Municipal assoc.: Schwarzenbek-Land

Government
  - Mayor: Gisela Wruck

Area
  - Total: 10.82 km^{2} (4.18 sq mi)
- Elevation: 45 m (148 ft)

Population (2025-12-31)
  - Total: 438
  - Density: 40.5/km^{2} (105/sq mi)
- Time zone: UTC+01:00 (CET)
  - Summer (DST): UTC+02:00 (CEST)
- Postal codes: 21493
- Dialling codes: 04159
- Vehicle registration: RZ
- Website: www.basthorst.de

Basthorst is a municipality in the district of Lauenburg, in Schleswig-Holstein, Germany.
