= Grabau, Lauenburg =

Grabau
- Municipality
- Coat of arms

- Location of Grabau within Herzogtum Lauenburg district
- Interactive map of Grabau
- Location within Germany Location within Schleswig-Holstein
- Coordinates: 53°30′52″N 10°31′15″E
- Country: Germany
- State: Schleswig-Holstein
- District: Herzogtum Lauenburg
- Municipal assoc.: Schwarzenbek-Land

Government
  - Mayor: Bernd Granzow

Area
  - Total: 4.1 km^{2} (1.6 sq mi)
- Elevation: 38 m (125 ft)

Population (2025-12-31)
  - Total: 350
  - Density: 85/km^{2} (220/sq mi)
- Time zone: UTC+01:00 (CET)
  - Summer (DST): UTC+02:00 (CEST)
- Postal codes: 21493
- Dialling codes: 04151
- Vehicle registration: RZ
- Website: www.amt-schwarzenbek-land.de

Grabau (German pronunciation: [ˈɡʁaːbaʊ]) is a municipality in the district of Lauenburg, in Schleswig-Holstein, Germany.
