= Dassendorf =

- Municipality
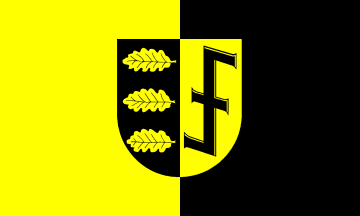
- Flag Coat of arms

- Location of Dassendorf within Herzogtum Lauenburg district
- Interactive map of Dassendorf
- Location within Germany Location within Schleswig-Holstein
- Coordinates: 53°29′33″N 10°22′33″E
- Country: Germany
- State: Schleswig-Holstein
- District: Herzogtum Lauenburg
- Municipal assoc.: Hohe Elbgeest

Government
  - Mayor: Matina Falkenberg

Area
  - Total: 7.94 km^{2} (3.07 sq mi)
- Elevation: 55 m (180 ft)

Population (2025-12-31)
  - Total: 3,397
  - Density: 428/km^{2} (1,110/sq mi)
- Time zone: UTC+01:00 (CET)
  - Summer (DST): UTC+02:00 (CEST)
- Postal codes: 21521
- Dialling codes: 04104
- Vehicle registration: RZ
- Website: www.amt-hohe- elbgeest.de

Dassendorf (German pronunciation: [ˈdasn̩dɔʁf]) is a municipality in the district of Lauenburg, in Schleswig-Holstein, Germany. The settlement is east of Hamburg, west of Schwarzenbek and north of Geesthacht.

== History ==
In 1960, SS officer Richard Baer was arrested while hiding in Dassendorf under an assumed identity (Carl Neumann).

== Community facilities ==
There is a golf club. There is also a community garden.
