= Wohltorf =

- Municipality
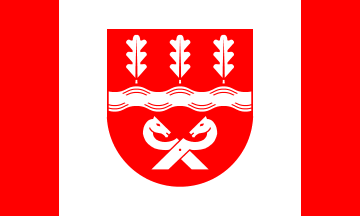
- Flag Coat of arms

- Location of Wohltorf within Herzogtum Lauenburg district
- Interactive map of Wohltorf
- Location within Germany Location within Schleswig-Holstein
- Coordinates: 53°31′31″N 10°32′0″E
- Country: Germany
- State: Schleswig-Holstein
- District: Herzogtum Lauenburg
- Municipal assoc.: Hohe Elbgeest

Government
  - Mayor: Hans-Joachim Püst

Area
  - Total: 5.94 km^{2} (2.29 sq mi)
- Elevation: 33 m (108 ft)

Population (2025-12-31)
  - Total: 469
  - Density: 79.0/km^{2} (204/sq mi)
- Time zone: UTC+01:00 (CET)
  - Summer (DST): UTC+02:00 (CEST)
- Postal codes: 21521
- Dialling codes: 04104
- Vehicle registration: RZ
- Website: www.amt-schwarzenbek-land.de

Wohltorf is a municipality in the district of Lauenburg, in Schleswig-Holstein, Germany.

== Transportation ==
Wohltorf station is serviced by the rapid transit system of the Hamburg S-Bahn.
