= Hohenhorn =

- Municipality
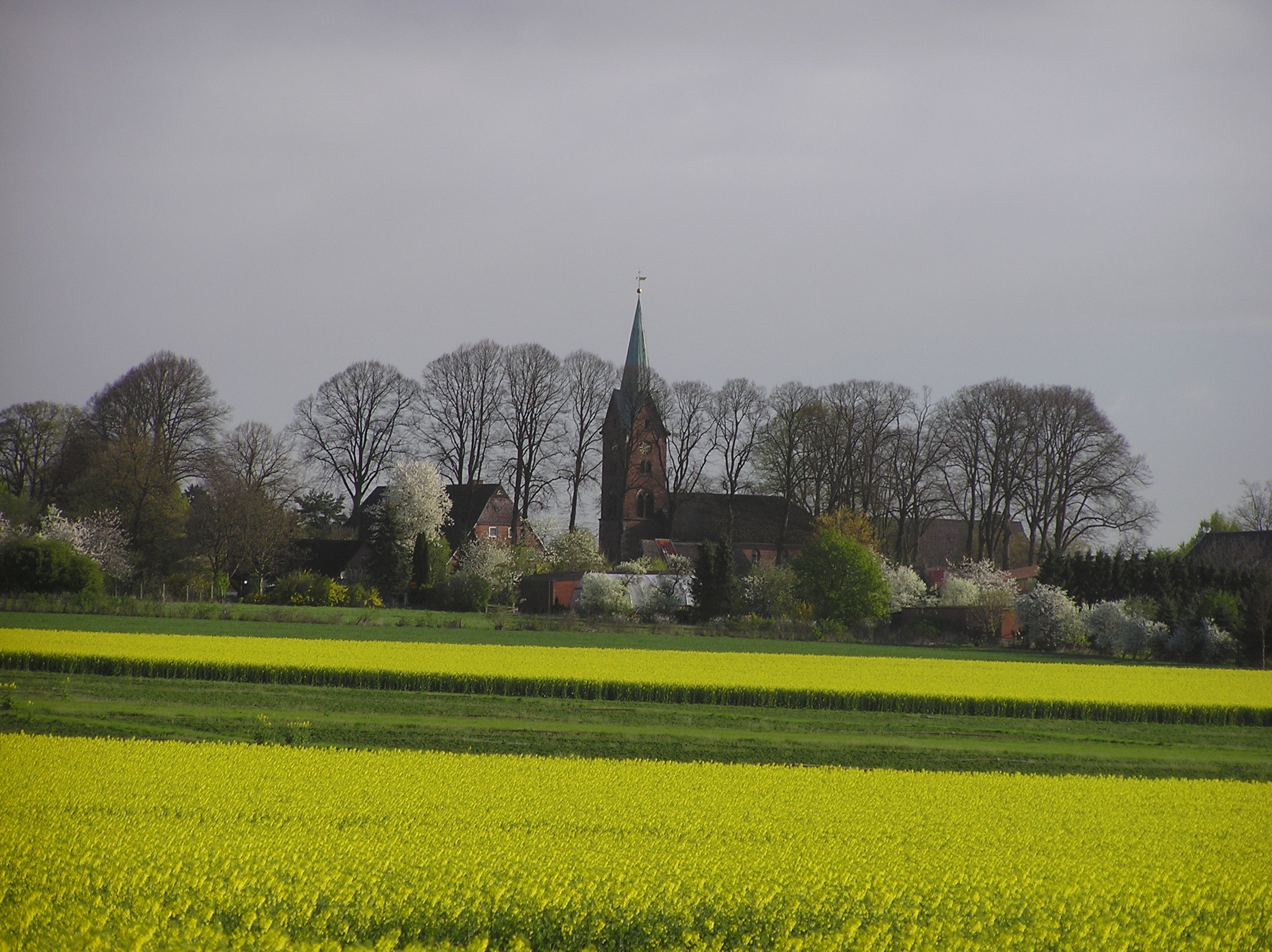

- Flag Coat of arms

- Location of Hohenhorn within Herzogtum Lauenburg district
- Interactive map of Hohenhorn
- Location within Germany Location within Schleswig-Holstein
- Coordinates: 53°28′39″N 10°22′7″E
- Country: Germany
- State: Schleswig-Holstein
- District: Herzogtum Lauenburg
- Municipal assoc.: Hohe Elbgeest

Government
  - Mayor: Hanna Putfarken

Area
  - Total: 6.93 km^{2} (2.68 sq mi)
- Elevation: 68 m (223 ft)

Population (2025-12-31)
  - Total: 517
  - Density: 74.6/km^{2} (193/sq mi)
- Time zone: UTC+01:00 (CET)
  - Summer (DST): UTC+02:00 (CEST)
- Postal codes: 21526
- Dialling codes: 04152
- Vehicle registration: RZ
- Website: www.hohenhorn.de

Hohenhorn is a municipality in the district of Herzogtum Lauenburg, in Schleswig-Holstein, Germany.
