= Kröppelshagen-Fahrendorf =

- Municipality
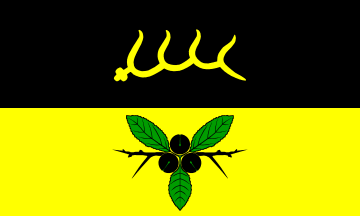
- Flag Coat of arms

- Location of Kröppelshagen-Fahrendorf within Herzogtum Lauenburg district
- Interactive map of Kröppelshagen-Fahrendorf
- Location within Germany Location within Schleswig-Holstein
- Coordinates: 53°29′25″N 10°19′1″E
- Country: Germany
- State: Schleswig-Holstein
- District: Herzogtum Lauenburg
- Municipal assoc.: Hohe Elbgeest

Government
  - Mayor: Volker Merkel (CDU)

Area
  - Total: 8.37 km^{2} (3.23 sq mi)
- Elevation: 57 m (187 ft)

Population (2025-12-31)
  - Total: 1,351
  - Density: 161/km^{2} (418/sq mi)
- Time zone: UTC+01:00 (CET)
  - Summer (DST): UTC+02:00 (CEST)
- Postal codes: 21529
- Dialling codes: 04104, 04152
- Vehicle registration: RZ
- Website: www.amt-hohe- elbgeest.de

Kröppelshagen-Fahrendorf is a municipality in the district of Lauenburg, in Schleswig-Holstein, Germany.
