= Börnsen =

- Municipality
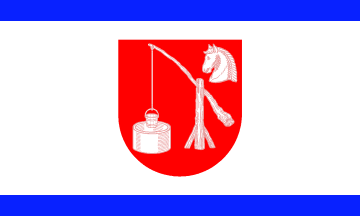
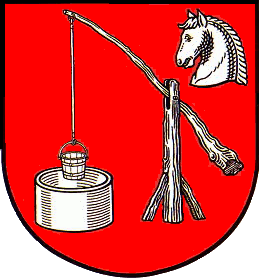
- Flag Coat of arms

- Location of Börnsen within Herzogtum Lauenburg district
- Interactive map of Börnsen
- Location within Germany Location within Schleswig-Holstein
- Coordinates: 53°28′N 10°17′E
- Country: Germany
- State: Schleswig-Holstein
- District: Herzogtum Lauenburg
- Municipal assoc.: Hohe Elbgeest

Government
  - Mayor: Walter Heisch

Area
  - Total: 8.42 km^{2} (3.25 sq mi)
- Elevation: 48 m (157 ft)

Population (2025-12-31)
  - Total: 4,706
  - Density: 559/km^{2} (1,450/sq mi)
- Time zone: UTC+01:00 (CET)
  - Summer (DST): UTC+02:00 (CEST)
- Postal codes: 21039
- Dialling codes: 040
- Vehicle registration: RZ
- Website: www.amt-hohe- elbgeest.de

Börnsen is a municipality in the district of Lauenburg, in Schleswig-Holstein, Germany.
