= Rudolph Crasemann =

German businessman (1841–1929)

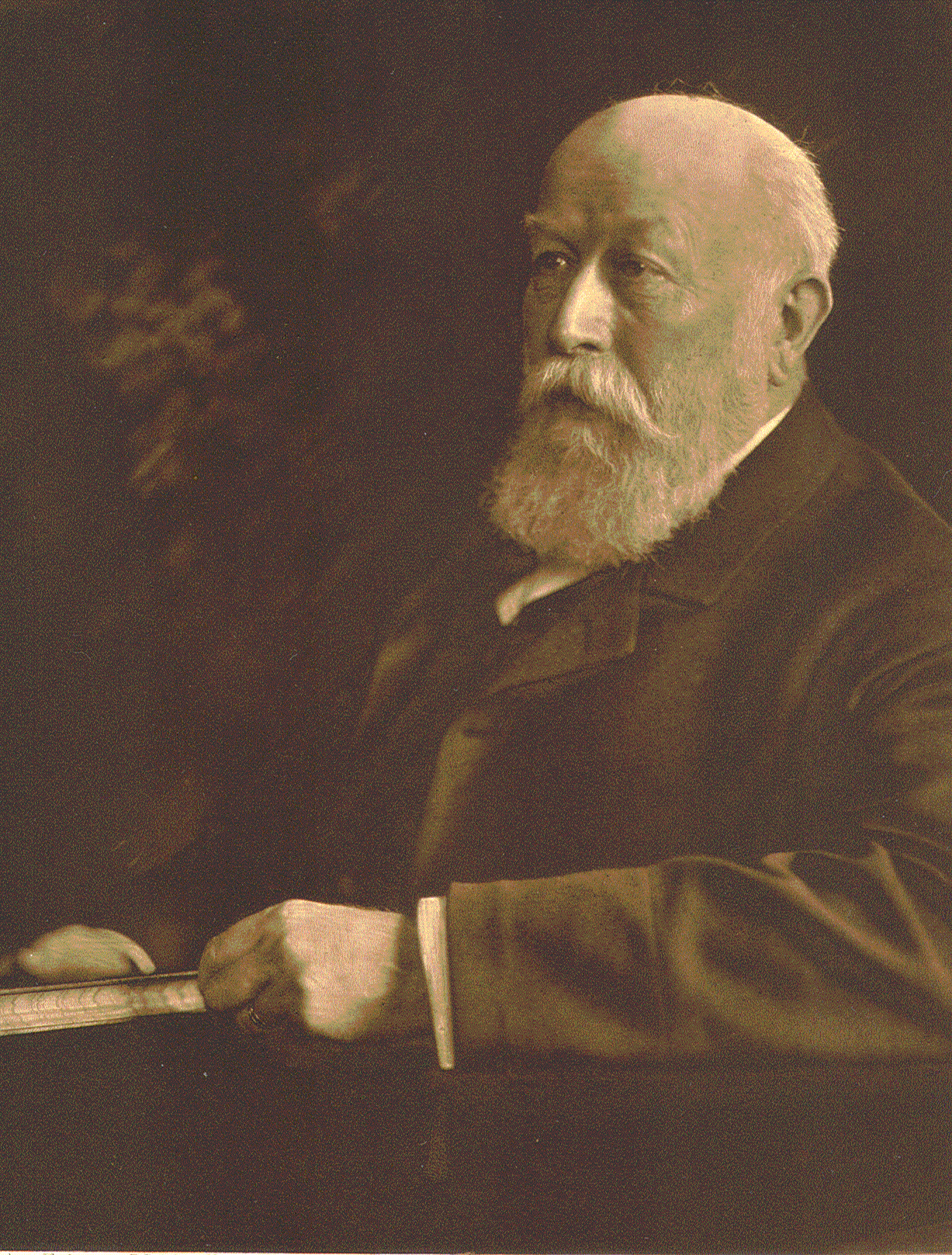
Rudolph Crasemann 1905

Gustav August Rudolph Crasemann (born 14 August 1841 in Hamburg, died 24 November 1929 in Blankenese) was a Hamburg businessman and parliamentarian.

== Life ==
Son of an established Hamburg merchant family, Rudolph Crasemann first completed his apprenticeship as a merchant in his hometown of Hamburg. After his education, he remained with the same company he did his apprenticeship in a junior position. After the company was liquidated, he founded Crasemann & Stavenhagen in 1861 with Ernst Friedrich Stavenhagen. In time, the company developed very successful overseas business activities. After Stavenhagen's death in 1875, a younger brother of Rudolph Crasemann joined the company as partner.

In 1877 Crasemann became a member of the Commerzdeputation, the Hamburg Chamber of Commerce, which he headed from January 1891 to January 1895 and again from January 1915 to January 1917 as president, like his father Claes Christian Crasemann in 1860. Rudolph Crasemann was known for his charitable activities as he contributed to a number of charitable organisations in Hamburg.

In 1880 and from 1883 until 1907 he was a member of the Hamburg Parliament (Hamburgische Bürgerschaft). From 1909 to 1912 he served as the Vice President of the Hansabund, an economic órganisation of German merchants and industrialists based in Berlin, and as the head of its Hamburg subsidiary. He was an opponent of the transformation of the Colonial Institute to become the University of Hamburg. In addition to his many commitments, he was member of the administrative board of the German Naval Overseas Federation (Hauptverband der deutschen Flottenvereine im Ausland) which actively promoted an extended German naval presence backed financially through contributions from the overseas subsidiaries.

Rudolph Crasemann was married to Juliane Helene Köpcke and together they had six children, amongst them Wilhelm Alfred Hans Crasemann and Helene Crasemann. One of Rudolph and Juliane's granddaughters Dorothea von Salviati, daughter of Helene Crasemann and Alexander Hermann Heinrich August von Salviati went on to marry Prince Wilhelm of Prussia.
