= Schwarzenbek =

- Town
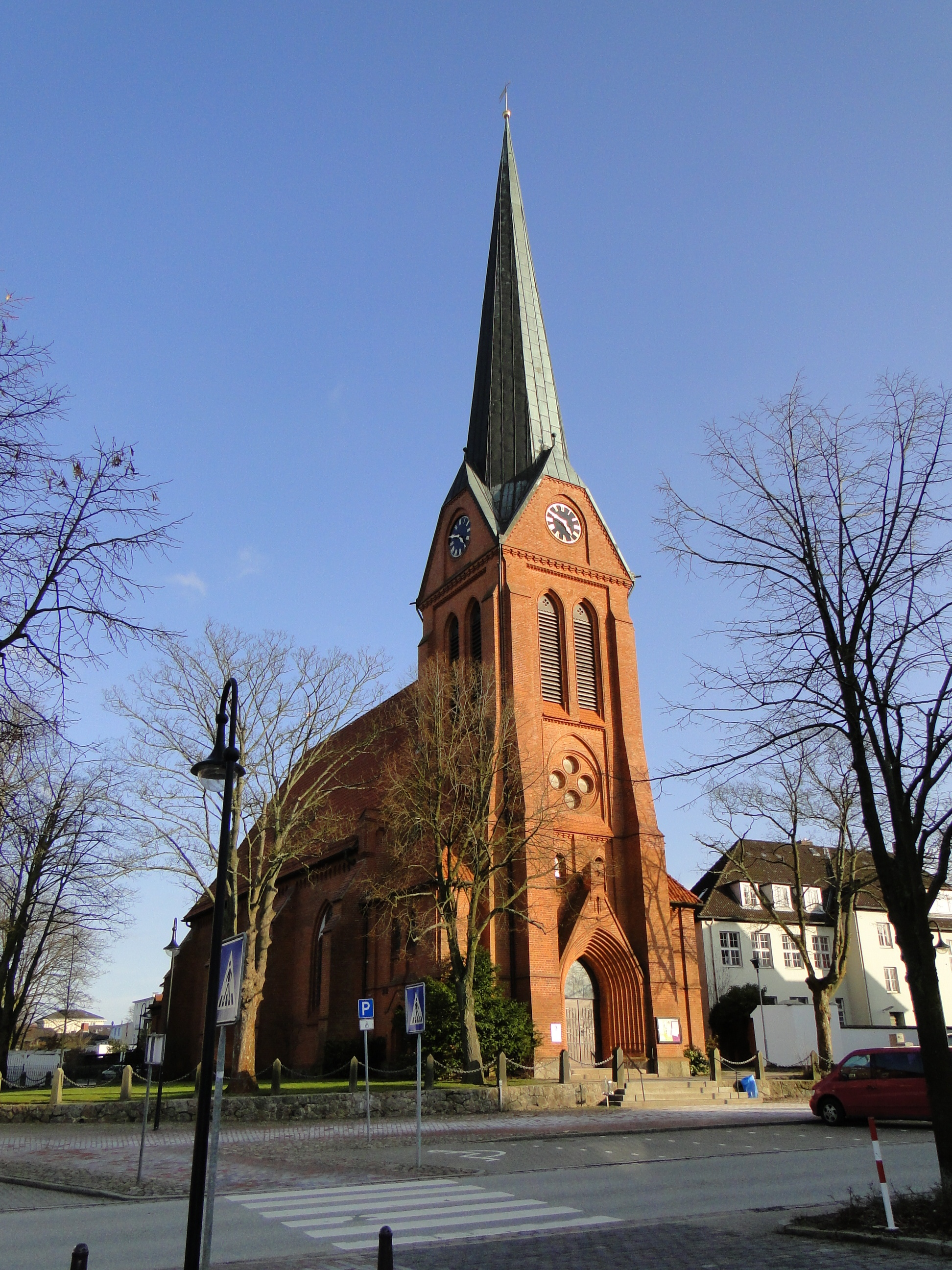
- Church of Saint Francis

- Coat of arms

- Location of Schwarzenbek within Herzogtum Lauenburg district
- Interactive map of Schwarzenbek
- Location within Germany Location within Schleswig-Holstein
- Coordinates: 53°30′15″N 10°28′45″E
- Country: Germany
- State: Schleswig-Holstein
- District: Herzogtum Lauenburg

Government
  - Mayor: Norbert Lütjens (Ind.)

Area
  - Total: 11.55 km^{2} (4.46 sq mi)
- Elevation: 44 m (144 ft)

Population (2025-12-31)
  - Total: 16,923
  - Density: 1,465/km^{2} (3,795/sq mi)
- Time zone: UTC+01:00 (CET)
  - Summer (DST): UTC+02:00 (CEST)
- Postal codes: 21493
- Dialling codes: 04151
- Vehicle registration: RZ
- Website: www.schwarzenbek.de

Schwarzenbek (German pronunciation: [ˈʃvaʁtsn̩beːk]; Low German: Swattenbeek) is a town in the district of Lauenburg, in Schleswig-Holstein, Germany. It is situated east of Dassendorf and approximately 10 km northeast of Geesthacht, and 35 km east of Hamburg. Schwarzenbeks' coat of arms shows a black wolf on a yellow field, beneath the wolf, the water symbolizes the river Schwarze Beke (meaning Black Creek).

== Schwarze Beke ==
The creek is eponymous for the city in the north of Germany. The "Schwarze Beke" springs southeast of Schwarzenbek at Gut Melusinenthal, goes through the Rülauer forest, a fruit plantation area, and some grassland before the creek ends up in a pipe following the train tracks and anastomoses with the "Schwarze Au" which empties out in Aumühle in the "Bille" which anastomoses with a German main river the "Elbe".

== History ==
The first known reference to a population around the "Schwarze Beke" was in the year 1291. The municipal law followed in 1953 given by the government of the state Schleswig-Holstein. The location made Schwarzenbek attractive for many people after that not only that but also the transport connection the Hamburg with the "Deutsche Bahn" the most successful public transportation company in Germany. Connection to Lübeck and Hamburg, main cities in the north of Germany, have been there early in Schwarzenbek's history. Schwarzenbek fraternized with cities all over Europe what gave it its name as "Europastadt" (European city). Aubenas in France, Sierre in Switzerland and Zelzate in Belgium fraternized with Schwarzenbek in the year of 1955. Two more cities in Europe followed in 1960 including Cesenatico in Italy and Delfzijl in the Netherlands. To show the inhabitants their fraternization to those cities the city named a district of Schwarzenbek Verbrüderungsring (Connection ring) and named streets in that quarter after those cities in Europe. Schwarzenbek was the second city in Germany which was awarded the Europapreis (European prize). Schwarzenbek's size grew tremendously the past years and didn't stop growing ever since.

== Inhabitants ==
Schwarzenbek is the third largest city in district of Lauenburg and one of the parishes in the state "Schleswig-Holstein" after Geesthacht and Mölln. Most of the inhabitants are young families and commuters.

Historical inhabitants are:

Year	Inhabitants
1850	500
1900	1,200
1938	2,200
1995	12,000
2005	15,019
2006	15,022

== Town twinning ==
- Cesenatico, Italy
- Delfzijl, Netherlands
- Sierre, Switzerland
- Zelzate, Belgium
- Aubenas, France

== Other personalities associated with the town ==
- Francis Erdmann, Duke of Saxe-Lauenburg (1629-1666), Duke of Saxe-Lauenburg, died in Schwarzenbek
