= Geesthacht =

- Town
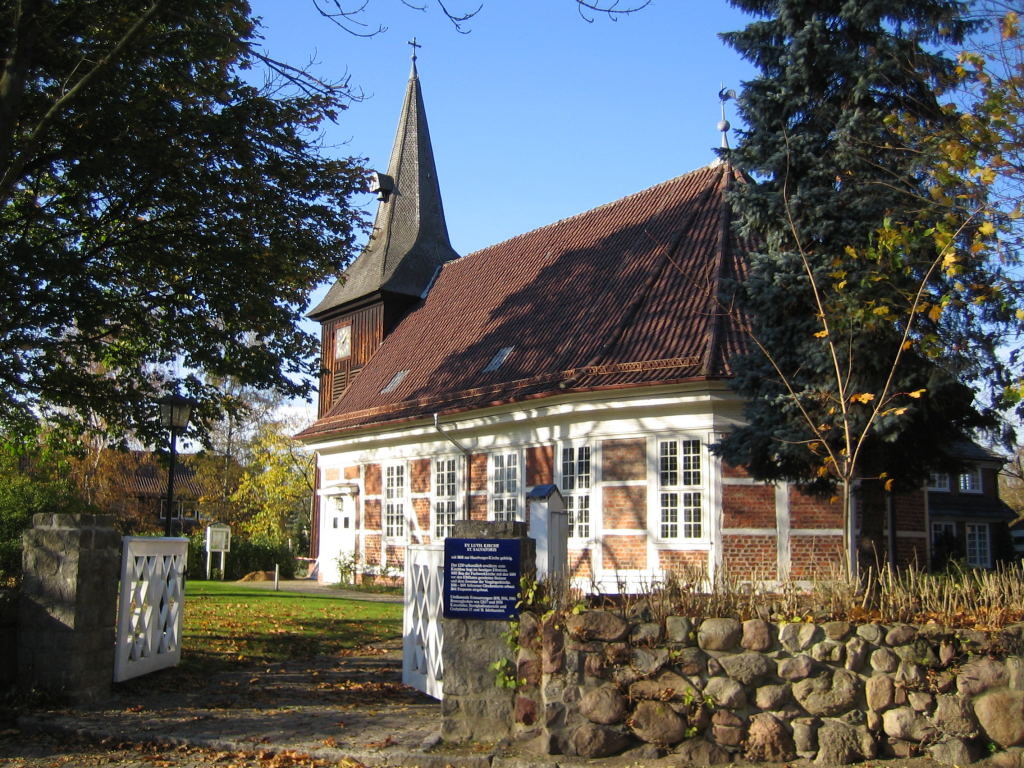
- Church in Geesthacht

- Coat of arms

- Location of Geesthacht within Lauenburg district
- Interactive map of Geesthacht
- Location within Germany Location within Schleswig-Holstein
- Coordinates: 53°26′15″N 10°22′03″E
- Country: Germany
- State: Schleswig-Holstein
- District: Lauenburg

Government
  - Mayor: Olaf Schulze

Area
  - Total: 33.25 km^{2} (12.84 sq mi)
- Elevation: 5 m (16 ft)

Population (2025-12-31)
  - Total: 33,955
  - Density: 1,021/km^{2} (2,645/sq mi)
- Time zone: UTC+01:00 (CET)
  - Summer (DST): UTC+02:00 (CEST)
- Postal codes: 21498–21502
- Dialling codes: 04152
- Vehicle registration: RZ
- Website: www.geesthacht.de

Geesthacht (German: [ɡeːstˈhaxt]) is the largest city in the District of the Duchy of Lauenburg (Herzogtum Lauenburg) in Schleswig-Holstein in Northern Germany, 34 kilometres (21 mi) south-east of Hamburg on the right bank of the River Elbe. Dassendorf lies to the north.

== History ==
A church was built in what is today Geesthacht around the year 800. The town was first mentioned in 1216 as Hachede, then a part of the Duchy of Saxony. A change in the course of the Elbe cut the settlement into two: Geesthacht and Marschacht (in today's Lower Saxony). In 1296, Geesthacht became part of the Duchy of Saxe-Lauenburg, partitioned from Saxony. Duke Eric III pawned Geesthacht - as part of the Herrschaft of Bergedorf - to the Free City of Lübeck in 1370. In 1401, Duke Eric IV retook the pawned area by force. Geesthacht was ceded as part of a condominium to the Hanseatic cities Hamburg and Lübeck by the Peace of Perleberg in 1420.

In 1811, Geesthacht was annexed to the First French Empire as part of the Bouches de l'Elbe département, but the condominium was restored two years later. In the 1860s, Swedish chemist Alfred Nobel established a glycerin factory in Geesthacht (on Krümmel hill) and invented dynamite, with Krümmel becoming the first dynamite factory in the world. Lübeck sold its share in the condominium to Hamburg in 1868, and Geesthacht became a part Hamburg's state territory. The Bergedorf-Geesthachter Railway (BGE) opened in 1906.

During the Weimar Republic, Geesthacht was a hotbed of radical leftist parties (USPD, KPD and SAPD) and acquired the nickname Little Moscow. It was granted town privileges by the Hamburg state order of 2 January 1924. The historical town center was destroyed by a fire in 1928. As part of the Greater Hamburg Act of 1937, Geesthacht was transferred to the Prussian province of Schleswig-Holstein, there becoming part of the district (Kreis) of Lauenburg. After the territorial reorganization in Allied-occupied Germany in the aftermath of World War II, the province of Schleswig-Holstein was transformed into the modern state of Schleswig-Holstein. In 1953, passenger service on the Bergedorf-Geesthachter Eisenbahn (a railway line) was suspended.

== Politics ==
At present, the city council is composed as follows:

	CDU	SPD	GRÜNE	FDP	Linke	Offensive D	Total
2009	12	10	5	4	2	0	33
2003	17	12	3	2	0	2	36

The current mayor of Geesthacht is Olaf Schulze of the SPD, who was elected on the 08/08/2021.

== Economics and transportation ==
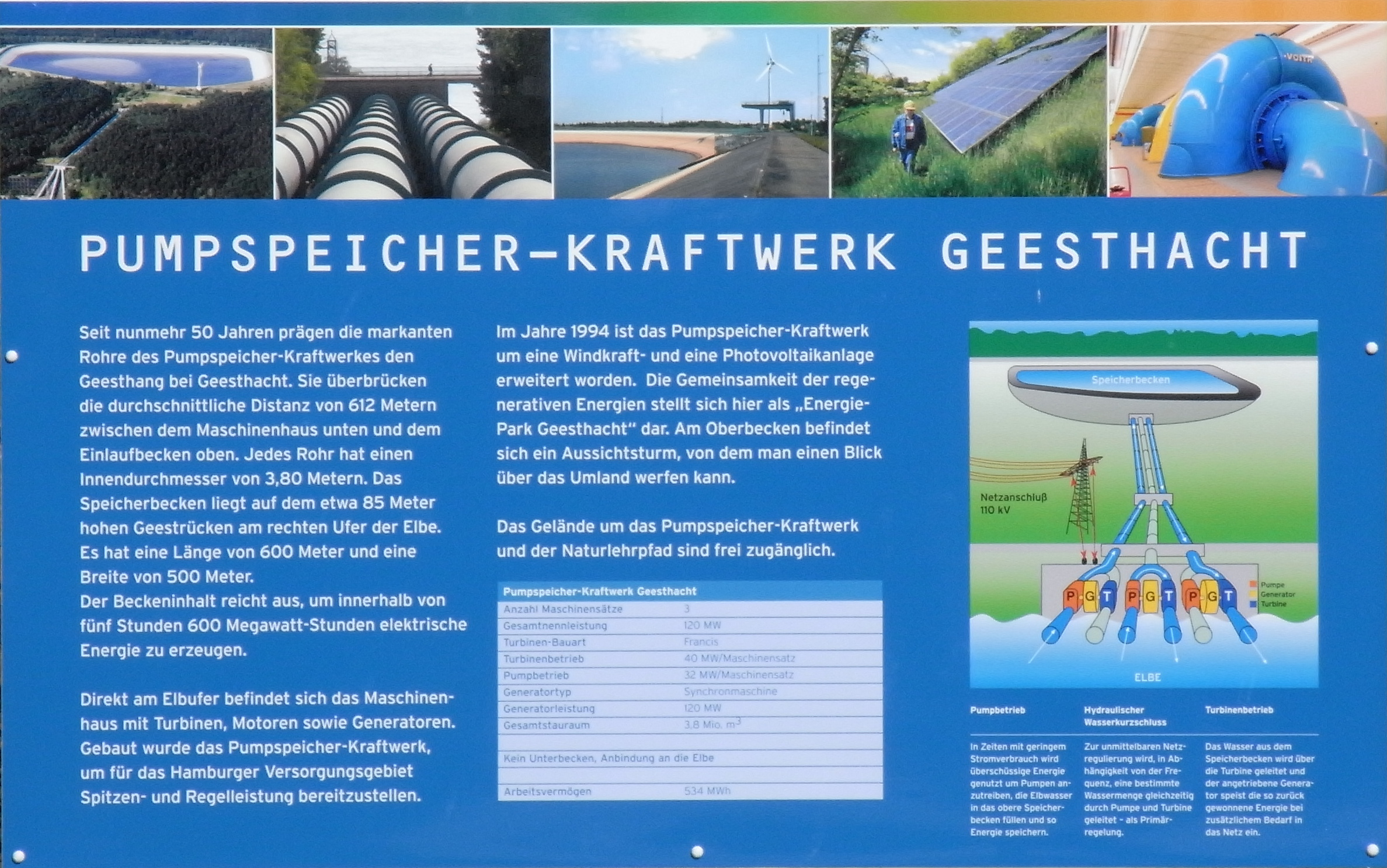
Information table about the pumped storage

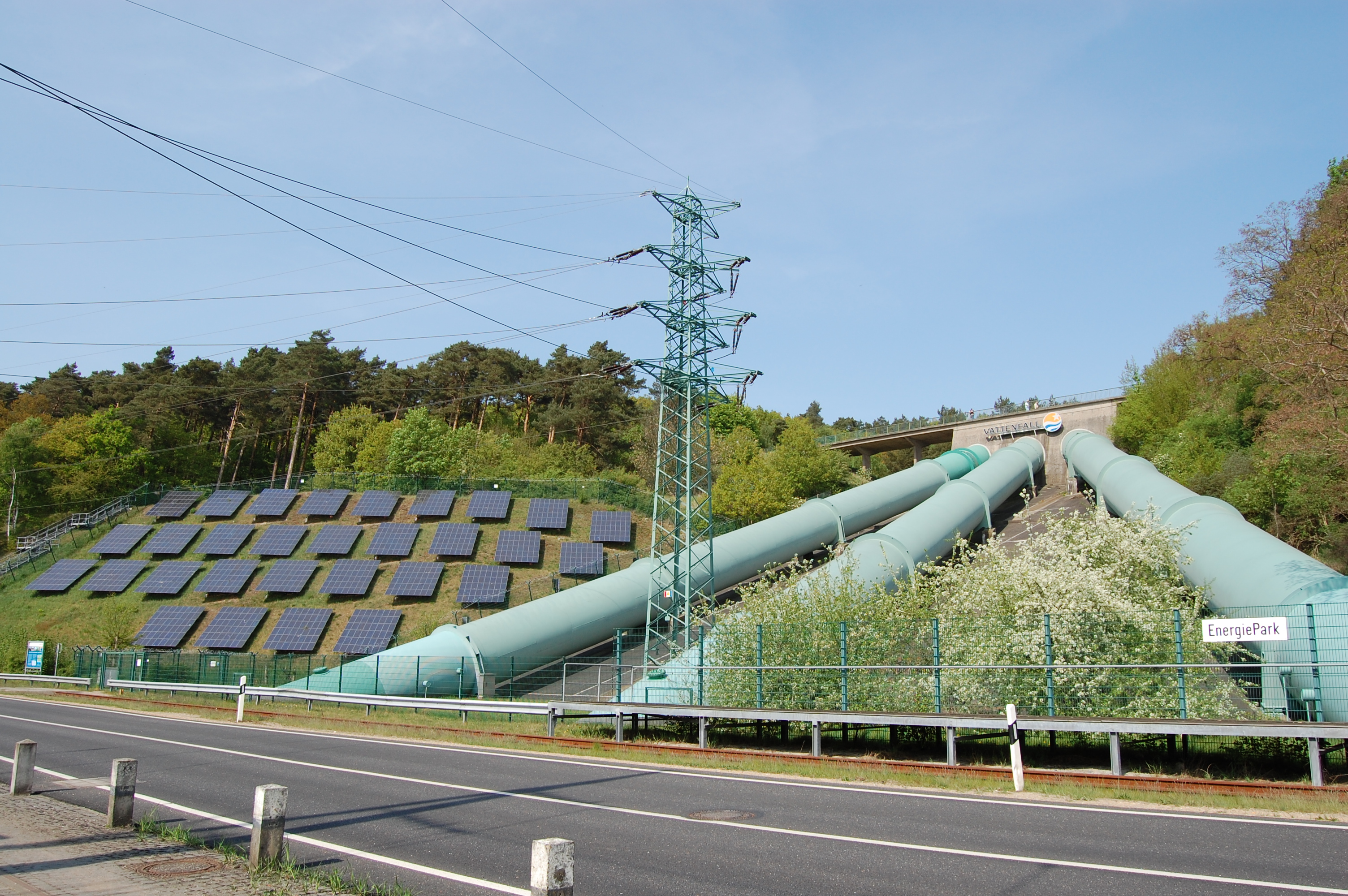
Pump tubes and solar panels

Geesthacht is a major energy and scientific research center. It has the Krümmel Nuclear Power Plant (closed 2011 after Fukushima - "Atomausstieg"), a boiling water nuclear reactor on the River Elbe, and a 120 MW pumped storage hydroelectrical plant situated within a few hundreds metres of the nuclear power plant. It consists of an artificial lake 80m above the river, where the water is pumped up from, and 600 MWh storage for later use in generating electricity when demand is high. Small wind and solar plants also produce electricity or pump water.

- Freeway 25 from Hamburg
- Federal road B5 from Hamburg in the west to Lauenburg in the east
- Disused railway line to Hamburg-Bergedorf
- River port on the Elbe, Elbe locks
- The nearest airport is at Hamburg-Fuhlsbüttel
- The nearest sea harbour is the Port of Hamburg

=== State institutions ===
- Helmholtz-Zentrum Hereon is a Federal research institution for environmental and materials research. In 1956, the northern German coastal states established a research center based in Geesthacht to explore the civilian use of nuclear energy for ship propulsion. The center was initially called the "Society for the Utilization of Nuclear Energy in Shipbuilding and Shipping" ("Gesellschaft für Kernenergieverwertung in Schiffbau und Schifffahrt). Until 2010, the center operated two research reactors. Since then, the focus of its more than 1,000 employees has been on materials and environmental research.

=== Leisure and sports sites ===
- Open-air swimming pool at the Elbe

=== Theatre ===
- Kleines Theater Schillerstrasse - small art meetings and cinema

=== Museums ===
- Krügersches Haus - a permanent exhibition relating the history of the city

== Twin towns – sister cities ==
Geesthacht is twinned with:

- Kuldīga, Latvia (1991)
- Midden-Groningen, Netherlands (1966)
- Plaisir, France (1975)

== Notable people ==
- Joachim Ritter (1903–1974), philosopher
- Frank Peterson (born 1963), music producer

== Trivia ==
The conservative politician Uwe Barschel, who was later involved in the "Waterkantgate" scandal, took his Abitur at the Otto-Hahn-Gymnasium in Geesthacht and as a student representative invited former Nazi admiral Dönitz to give a presentation on the topic of 'The Modernisation of History Classes' ("Aktualisierung des Geschichtsunterrichts"). Following the scandal, his principal committed suicide under the ensuing pressure.

== Literature ==
- Heinz Bohlmann: Fäuste, Führer, Flüchtlingstrecks. Ein Beitrag zur Geschichte der Städte Geesthacht und Lauenburg/Elbe 1930–1950. Schwarzenbeck 1990. ISBN 3-921595-15-0
- Bernhard Michael Menapace: "Klein-Moskau" wird braun: Geesthacht in der Endphase der Weimarer Republik (1928–1933). Kiel 1991. ISBN 3-89029-923-7
- August Ziehl: Geesthacht - 60 Jahre Arbeiterbewegung 1890–1950. Geesthacht 1958.
