= Landeskirche =

Protestant church of a region in Germany or Switzerland

In Germany and Switzerland, a Landeskirche (German: [ˈlandəsˌkɪʁçə]; plural: Landeskirchen, German: [ˈlandəsˌkɪʁçn̩]) is the church of a region. The term usually refers to Protestant churches, but—in case of Switzerland—also Roman Catholic dioceses. They originated as the national churches of the independent states, States of Germany (Länder) or Cantons of Switzerland (Kantone, Cantons, Cantoni), that later unified to form modern Germany (in 1871) or modern Switzerland (in 1848), respectively.

== Origins in the Holy Roman Empire ==
In the pre-Reformation era, the organization of the church within a land was understood as a landeskirche, certainly under a higher power (the pope or a patriarch), but also possessing an increased measure of independence, especially as concerning its internal structure and its relations to its king, prince or ruler. Unlike in Scandinavia and England, the bishops in the national churches did not survive the Reformation, making it impossible for a conventional diocesan system to continue within Lutheranism. Therefore, Martin Luther demanded that, as a stop-gap, each secular Landesherr (territorial lord, monarch or a body, like the governments of republican Imperial estates, such as Free Imperial Cities or Swiss cantons) should exercise episcopal functions in the respective territories. The principle of cuius regio, eius religio also arose out of the Reformation, and according to this a Landesherr chose what denomination his subjects had to belong to. This led to closed, insular landeskirchen. The principle was a byproduct of religious politics in the Holy Roman Empire and soon softened after the Thirty Years' War.

At the time of the abolition of the monarchies in Germany in 1918, the Landesherren were summus episcopus (Landesbischöfe, comparable to the Supreme Governor of the Church of England) in the states or their administrative areas, and the ties between churches and nations came to be particularly close, even with Landesherren outside the Lutheran church. So the (Roman Catholic) king of Bavaria was at the same time supreme governor (summus episcopus) of the Evangelical Lutheran Church in Bavaria right of the river Rhine. In practice, the Landesherren exercised episcopal functions (summepiscopacy) only indirectly through consistories (German: Konsistorium/Konsistorien [sg./pl.]).

== In Germany ==
=== List of Landeskirchen in 1922 with changes until 1945 ===
Those of the following Landeskirchen, which existed in 1922, founded the new umbrella German Evangelical Church Confederation (German: Deutscher Evangelischer Kirchenbund, 1922–1933). There were mergers in the 1920s and under Nazi reign in 1933 and 1934.

The first date given before every entry in the table below refers to the year, when the respective church body was constituted. Such a date of constitution is somewhat difficult to fix for the 19th century, when church constitutions were reformed and came into effect, which usually provided for more or less state-independent legislative and executive bodies more or less elected by parishioners. The Protestant Reformation and some church organisation (Kirchenordnung) of course existed long before.

For the 20th century the given years refer to the formal establishment of the respective church body. The second date refers to the year, when the respective church body ceased to exist (if so), due to a merger or unwinding. The third entry gives the name of each church body alphabetically assorted by the first territorial entity mentioned in the name. This makes sense because Landeskirchen have clear regional demarcations, therefore usually somehow mentioned in their names. The post-World War I church bodies, listed below, have never existed all in the same time. One can sort the table below alphabetically or chronologically by clicking on the button with the gyronny of four.

Consti- tuted in	Merged in	Name of the church body	Denomination	Number of souls and territorial ambit	Remarks
19th century	persisting	Anhalt; Evangelical State Church of Anhalt; German: Evangelische Landeskirche Anhalts	United by confession	315,000 parishioners (1922); Free State of Anhalt	The Church body comprises only congregations of united confession. The official church body became a destroyed church (German: zerstörte Kirche), since it was taken over by Nazi-submissive German Christians, who gained a majority in the synod by the unconstitutional election imposed by Hitler on 23 July 1933. Nazi opponents formed the Confessing Church of Anhalt.
1821	persisting	Baden; United Evangelical Protestant State Church of Baden; German: Vereinigte Evangelisch-protestantische Landeskirche Badens	United by confession	821,000 parishioners (1922) the Republic of Baden	The new name replaced the prior United Evangelical Protestant Church of the Grand Duchy of Baden in 1920, when the new church constitution accounted for the Grand Duchy having become a republic. The Church body comprises only congregations of united confession. The official church body became a destroyed church (German: zerstörte Kirche), since it was taken over by Nazi-submissive German Christians, who gained a majority in the synod by the unconstitutional election imposed by Hitler on 23 July 1933. Nazi opponents formed the Confessing Church of Baden.
1809	persisting	Bavaria; Evangelical Lutheran Church in Bavaria right of the river Rhine; German: Evangelisch-lutherische Kirche in Bayern rechts des Rheins	Lutheran	1,575,000 parishioners (1925); Free State of Bavaria right of the Rhine, thus except of the then Bavarian Governorate of the Palatinate, which formed a separate church body since 1848. In 1918 the Reformed congregations earlier subsumed within the Bavaria church body seceded and founded the independent Evangelical Reformed Church in Bavaria (see Further Protestant church bodies in Germany). On 1 April 1921 the Evangelical Lutheran State Church of Saxe-Coburg merged in the Bavaria church body.	The new name replaced the prior Protestant State Church in the Kingdom of Bavaria right of the river Rhine in 1921, when the new church constitution accounted for the Kingdom having become a republic and the Reformed congregations having formed a separate church body. The Bavaria official church body remained an intact church (German: intakte Kirche), since the Nazi-submissive German Christians remained a minority in the synod after the unconstitutional election imposed by Hitler on 23 July 1933. Nazi opponents of the Confessing Church could act within the church body.
1843	1934	Birkenfeld; Evangelical Church of the Region of Birkenfeld; German: Evangelische Kirche des Landesteils Birkenfeld	United by confession	40,000 parishioners (1922); The Oldenburgian exclave of the Region of Birkenfeld. In 1934 the Birkenfeld church body merged into the Evangelical Church of the old-Prussian Union, to be precise in its Ecclesiastical Province in the Rhineland.	The new name replaced the prior Evangelical Church of the Principality of Birkenfeld after 1918, when the new Oldenburgian monarchy with its Principality of Birkenfeld had become a republic. The Church body comprised only congregations of united confession. The Ecclesiastical Province in the Rhineland, of which Birkenfeld had become a part, was a destroyed ecclesiastical province (German: zerstörte Kirche), since it was taken over by Nazi-submissive German Christians, who gained a majority in the provincial synod by the unconstitutional election imposed by Hitler on 23 July 1933. Nazi opponents formed the Confessing Church in the Rhineland.
1877	persisting	Bremian Evangelical Church; German: Bremische Evangelische Kirche	United in administration	260,000 parishioners (1922); Bremen city and one united congregation in the historical centre of Bremerhaven, which was extended by 1939 by prior Hanoveran suburbs, whose Lutheran parishes continue to belong to the Hanover Lutheran church body.	The church body comprises mostly Reformed and less Lutheran congregations and one united congregation. The official church body became a destroyed church (German: zerstörte Kirche), since it was taken over by Nazi-submissive German Christians, who gained a majority in the synod by the unconstitutional election imposed by Hitler on 23 July 1933. Nazi opponents formed the Bremian Confessing Church.
1872	persisting	Brunswickian Evangelical Lutheran State Church; German: Braunschweigische evangelisch-lutherische Landeskirche	Lutheran	464,000 parishioners (1922); Free State of Brunswick, when the state territory was altered in 1942, the Brunswick church body readjusted its ambit accordingly, ceding congregations to and receiving some from the Hanover Lutheran church body.	The official church body became a destroyed church (German: zerstörte Kirche), since it was taken over by Nazi-submissive German Christians, who gained a majority in the synod by the unconstitutional election imposed by Hitler on 23 July 1933. Nazi opponents formed the Brunswickian Confessing Church.
1922	1933	Frankfurt upon Main; Evangelical State Church of Frankfurt upon Main; German: Evangelische Landeskirche Frankfurt am Main	United in administration	220,000 parishioners (1922) the formerly Free City of Frankfurt upon Main, in 1866 annexed by Prussia and since then part of the Prussian Province of Hesse-Nassau. In September 1933 the illegitimate church governing board merged the Frankfurt church body in the Evangelical State Church of Hesse-Nassau.	The official Frankfurt church body became a destroyed church (German: zerstörte Kirche), since it was taken over by Nazi-submissive German Christians, who gained a majority in the synod by the unconstitutional election imposed by Hitler on 23 July 1933. Nazi opponents formed the Confessing Church of Frankfurt.
1860	1976	Hamburg; Evangelical Lutheran Church in the Hamburgian State; German: Evangelisch-Lutherische Kirche im Hamburgischen Staate	Lutheran	914,000 parishioners (1922); Free and Hanseatic City of Hamburg in its borders before the Greater Hamburg Act became effective on 1 April 1937, thus including Hamburg's then exclaves such as Cuxhaven, Geesthacht, and Großhansdorf, but without today's boroughs of Altona, Harburg, Wandsbek and further formerly Holsatian municipalities in the North Borough.	The official Hamburg church body became a destroyed church (German: zerstörte Kirche), since it was taken over by Nazi-submissive conservative Lutherans in May 1933 even before the German Christians gained a majority in the synod by the unconstitutional election imposed by Hitler on 23 July. Nazi opponents formed the Confessing Church of Hamburg.
1864	persisting	Hanover Lutheran; Evangelical Lutheran State Church of Hanover; German: Evangelisch-lutherische Landeskirche Hannovers	Lutheran	2,414,000 parishioners (1922); Prussian Province of Hanover, the territorial changes of the province in 1937 (Greater Hamburg Act) were not followed by a change in ecclesiastical ambit. In 1939 (Greater Bremen, annexation of Hanoveran suburbs of Bremen to Bremen proper) and 1942, when the provincial territory was altered along the Brunswickian border, both church bodies readjusted their ambits accordingly, ceding congregations to and receiving some from each other.	The official church body remained an intact church (German: intakte Kirche), since the Nazi-submissive German Christians remained a minority in the synod after the unconstitutional election imposed by Hitler on 23 July 1933. Nazi opponents of the Confessing Church could act within the church body.
1882	1989	Hanover Reformed; Evangelical Reformed State Church of the Province of Hanover; German: Evangelisch-reformierte Landeskirche der Provinz Hannover	Reformed	157,000 parishioners (1922); Prussian Province of Hanover and some Reformed parishes in Hamburg and Schleswig-Holstein acceded since 1923.	The new name replaced the prior Evangelical Reformed Church of the Province of Hanover in 1922, when the Hanover Reformed church body caught up in terms of the title with the Hanover Lutheran church body. The official church body remained an intact church (German: intakte Kirche), since the Nazi-submissive German Christians remained a minority in the synod after the unconstitutional election imposed by Hitler on 23 July 1933. Nazi opponents of the Confessing Church could act within the church body.
1873	1934	Hesse Cassel; Evangelical State Church of Hesse-Cassel; German: Evangelische Landeskirche von Hessen-Kassel	United in administration	822,000 parishioners (1922) the former Electorate of Hesse, in 1866 annexed by Prussia and since then part of the latter's Province of Hesse-Nassau. Some small northern exclaves in today's Lower Saxony were ceded in the 1920s to the Hanover Lutheran church body. In 1934 the Hesse Cassel church body merged in the Evangelical Church of Electoral Hesse-Waldeck.	The official Hesse Cassel church body became a destroyed church (German: zerstörte Kirche), since it was taken over by Nazi-submissive German Christians, who gained a majority in the synod by the unconstitutional election imposed by Hitler on 23 July 1933. However, a merger, planned since 1926, with the Frankfurt, Hesse state and Nassau church bodies failed after quarrels about their Nazi radicalism.
1934	persisting	Hesse Electorate and Waldeck; Evangelical Church of Hesse Electorate-Waldeck; German: Evangelische Kirche von Kurhessen-Waldeck	United in administration	no data yet the former Electorate of Hesse, except of some small northern exclaves in today's Lower Saxony, and the former Free State of Waldeck-Pyrmont, except of the Pyrmont exclaves.	The official Hesse Electorate and Waldeck church body became a destroyed church (German: zerstörte Kirche), since it was merged from two destroyed church bodies. Nazi opponents formed the Confessing Church of Electoral Hesse-Waldeck.
19th century	1933	Hesse state Evangelical Church in Hesse; German: Evangelische Kirche in Hessen	United in administration	848,000 parishioners (1922); People's State of Hesse. In September 1933 the illegitimate church governing board merged the Hesse state church body in the Evangelical State Church of Hesse-Nassau.	The official Hesse state church body became a destroyed church (German: zerstörte Kirche), since it was taken over by Nazi-submissive German Christians, who gained a majority in the synod by the unconstitutional election imposed by Hitler on 23 July 1933. Nazi opponents formed the Confessing Church of Hesse.
1933	1945	Hesse-Nassau; Evangelical State Church Hesse-Nassau; German: Evangelische Landeskirche Hessen-Nassau	United in administration	no data yet formerly Free City of Frankfurt upon Main, former Duchy of Nassau, both covered by then Hesse-Nassau province, and the People's State of Hesse	In September 1933 the destroyed Frankfurt, Hesse state, and Nassau church bodies merged in the new Hesse-Nassau church body, which thus became a new church body radically organised according to the Führerprinzip, thus anti-synodal and anti-presbyterial. With the end of the Nazi reign this church body was dissolved. Nazi opponents had organised along the church bodies merged into this church body.
1877	persisting	Lippe State Church; German: Lippische Landeskirche	Reformed	143,000 parishioners (1922); Free State of Lippe.	Few Lutheran congregations have their own organisations within the else Reformed Lippe church body.
1895	1976	Lübeck city-state Evangelical Lutheran Church in the Lübeckian State; German: Evangelisch-Lutherische Kirche im Lübeckischen Staate	Lutheran	111,000 parishioners (1922); Free and Hanseatic City of Lübeck, the Lübeck state church body persisted also after Prussia had annexed the Lübeck state by in 1937 (Greater Hamburg Act), and its incorporation into the Prussian Schleswig-Holstein province.	The official Lübeck state church body became a destroyed church (German: zerstörte Kirche), since it was taken over by Nazi-submissive German Christians, who gained a majority in the synod by the unconstitutional election imposed by Hitler on 23 July 1933. Nazi opponents formed the Confessing Church of Lübeck state.
1921	1976	Lübeck region Evangelical Lutheran State Church of the Oldenburgian Region of Lübeck; German: Evangelisch-Lutherische Landeskirche des oldenburgischen Landesteils Lübeck	Lutheran	no data yet The Oldenburgian exclave of the Lübeck Region, the Lübeck region church body persisted also after Prussia had annexed the Lübeck Region in 1937 (Greater Hamburg Act), and its incorporation into the Prussian Schleswig-Holstein province.	The official Lübeck region church body became a destroyed church (German: zerstörte Kirche), since it was taken over by Nazi-submissive German Christians, who gained a majority in the synod by the unconstitutional election imposed by Hitler on 23 July 1933. However, its land provost (leading cleric) maintained a rather neutral position, so Nazi opponents of the Confessing Church could act within the official church body.
1835	1926	Lusatia; Lutheran Church in Upper Lusatia; German: Lutherische Kirche in der Oberlausitz	Lutheran	no data yet the region of Kreishauptmannschaft Bautzen (in German) of the then Free State of Saxony	In 1926 the Lusatia church body merged in the Saxony state church body.
1850	1934	Mecklenburg-Schwerin; Evangelical Lutheran Church of Mecklenburg-Schwerin; German: Evangelisch-lutherische Kirche von Mecklenburg-Schwerin	Lutheran	614,000 parishioners (1922); Free State of Mecklenburg-Schwerin. In 1934 the Mecklenburg-Schwerin church body merged in the Mecklenburg state church body.	The official Mecklenburg-Schwerin church body became a destroyed church (German: zerstörte Kirche), since it was taken over by Nazi-submissive German Christians, who gained a majority in the synod by the unconstitutional election imposed by Hitler on 23 July 1933.
19th century	1934	Mecklenburg-Strelitz; Mecklenburg-Strelitz State Church; German: Mecklenburg-Strelitzer Landeskirche	Lutheran	101,000 parishioners (1922); Free State of Mecklenburg-Strelitz. In 1934 the Mecklenburg-Strelitz church body merged in the Mecklenburg state church body.	The official Mecklenburg-Strelitz church body became a destroyed church (German: zerstörte Kirche), since it was taken over by Nazi-submissive German Christians, who gained a majority in the synod by the unconstitutional election imposed by Hitler on 23 July 1933. State bishop Gerhard Tolzien was deposed.
1934	2012	Mecklenburg (united state); Evangelical Lutheran State Church of Mecklenburg; German: Evangelisch-lutherische Landeskirche Mecklenburgs	Lutheran	no data yet former Free States of Mecklenburg-Schwerin and Mecklenburg-Strelitz. In 2012 the Mecklenburg church body merged in the new Evangelical Lutheran Church in Northern Germany.	The official Mecklenburg state church body became a destroyed church (German: zerstörte Kirche), since it was merged from two destroyed church bodies. Nazi opponents formed the Confessing Church in Mecklenburg.
1866	1933	Nassau; Evangelical State Church in Nassau; German: Evangelische Landeskirche in Nassau	United in administration	no data yet former Duchy of Nassau, in 1866 annexed by Prussia and since then part of the Prussian Province of Hesse-Nassau. In September 1933 the illegitimate church governing board merged the Hesse state church body in the Evangelical State Church of Hesse-Nassau.	The official Hesse state church body became a destroyed church (German: zerstörte Kirche), since it was taken over by Nazi-submissive German Christians, who gained a majority in the synod by the unconstitutional election imposed by Hitler on 23 July 1933. Nazi opponents formed the Confessing Church of Nassau.
19th century	persisting	Oldenburg; Evangelical Lutheran Church in Oldenburg; German: Evangelisch-lutherische Kirche in Oldenburg	Lutheran	291,000 parishioners (1922); Free State of Oldenburg except of its exclaves of Birkenfeld and Region of Lübeck. In 1921 the Lübeck region church body had seceded from the Oldenburg church body, while the Birkenfeld church body had never been part of the Oldenburg church body.	The official Oldenburg church body became a destroyed church (German: zerstörte Kirche), since it was taken over by Nazi-submissive German Christians, who gained a majority in the synod by the unconstitutional election imposed by Hitler on 23 July 1933. Nazi opponents formed the Confessing Church of Oldenburg.
1848	persisting	Palatinate; United Protestant Evangelical Christian Church of the Palatinate (Palatine State Church); German: Vereinigte protestantisch-evangelisch-christliche Kirche der Pfalz (Pfälzische Landeskirche)	United by confession	506,000 parishioners (1922) the then Bavarian Governorate of the Palatinate and some eastern districts in Mandatory Saar (League of Nations).	Since the parishioners' plebiscite in 1817 all Palatine congregations are confessionally united. The official Palatinate church body became a destroyed church (German: zerstörte Kirche), since it was taken over by Nazi-submissive German Christians, who gained a majority in the synod by the unconstitutional election imposed by Hitler on 23 July 1933. Nazi opponents formed the Confessing Church of the Palatinate.
1817	2003	Prussia; Evangelical Church of the old-Prussian Union; German: Evangelische Kirche der altpreußischen Union abbreviations: ApU, EKapU	United in administration	18,000,000 parishioners (1922) the Prussian provinces of Berlin, Brandenburg, East Prussia, Hohenzollern, Pomerania, Posen-West Prussia, the Rhineland, Saxony, Silesia, and Westphalia as well as the League of Nations mandates of the Free City of Danzig, Klaipėda Region and the Saar (League of Nations), except of some eastern Palatine districts within the latter. All the parishes east of the Oder Neisse line, including the complete ecclesiastical provinces of Danzig, East Prussia and Posen-West Prussia vanished due to fleeing parishioners before the Soviet conquest and the subsequent violent expulsion of parishioners between 1945 and 1950, including many casualties. Also the bulk of the parishes in the Pomerania and Silesia ecclesiastical provinces were lost.	The new name replaced the prior Evangelical State Church of Prussia's older Provinces in 1922, accounting for the facts that the Weimar Constitution had done away with state churches in 1919, and that the old-Prussian congregations were then spreading over four sovereign states (Belgium, Czechoslovakia, Germany, and Poland) and three League of Nations mandates (Danzig, Klaipėda, and Saar) after the different post-World War I annexations. The new name was after a denomination, not after a state any more. It became a difficult task to maintain the unity of the church, with some of the annexing states being opposed to the fact that church bodies within their borders keep a union with German church organisations. The official old-Prussian church body became a destroyed church (German: zerstörte Kirche), since it was taken over by Nazi-submissive German Christians, who gained a majority in the general synod by the unconstitutional election imposed by Hitler on 23 July 1933. Only the Westphalia ecclesiastical province remained an intact church, since the German Christians did not gain the majority in its provincial synod, while all the other old-Prussian ecclesiastical provinces within Germany were taken over by German Christians as well. The Nazi opponents formed parallel Confessing Church institutions on the old-Prussian general level as well as in the destroyed ecclesiastical provinces.
19th century	1934	Reuss; Evangelical Lutheran Church in Reuss Elder Line; German: Evangelisch-lutherische Kirche in Reuß ältere Linie	Lutheran	70,000 parishioners (1922) former Principality of Reuss Elder Line within the then State of Thuringia.	The Reuss church body was a stronghold of Lutheran Orthodoxy and refused the merger with the other seven church bodies in Thuringia in 1920. However, in 1934 Reuss merged in the Thuringia church body.
1868	persisting	Saxony; Evangelical Lutheran State Church of the Free State of Saxony; German: Evangelisch-lutherische Landeskirche des Freistaats Sachsen	Lutheran	4,509,000 parishioners (1922) until 1926 the then Free State of Saxony except of the region of Kreishauptmannschaft Bautzen (in German), from 1926 on all the Free State of Saxony. All the parishes east of the Oder Neisse line vanished due to fleeing parishioners before the Soviet conquest and the subsequent violent expulsion of parishioners between 1945 and 1950, including casualties.	The new name came along with the new church constitution of 1922. The official Saxony church body became a destroyed church (German: zerstörte Kirche), since it was taken over by Nazi-submissive German Christians, who gained a majority in the synod by the unconstitutional election imposed by Hitler on 23 July 1933. Nazi opponents formed the Confessing Church of Saxony.
19th century	persisting	Schaumburg-Lippe; Evangelical Lutheran State Church of Schaumburg-Lippe; German: Evangelisch-lutherische Landeskirche von Schaumburg-Lippe	Lutheran	44,000 parishioners (1922); Free State of Schaumburg-Lippe	The Schaumburg-Lippe official church body remained an intact church (German: intakte Kirche), since the Nazi-submissive German Christians remained a minority in the synod after the unconstitutional election imposed by Hitler on 23 July 1933. Nazi opponents of the Confessing Church could act within the church body. Even the more, in 1936 the German Christian minority was excluded from the executive board, which was then only staffed with partisans of the Nazi-opponent Confessing Church.
1867	1976	Schleswig-Holstein; Evangelical Lutheran Church of Schleswig-Holstein; German: Evangelisch-Lutherische Landeskirche Schleswig-Holsteins	Lutheran	1,361,000 parishioners (1922); Province of Schleswig-Holstein in its borders of 1921 to 1936.	The official Schleswig-Holstein church body became a destroyed church (German: zerstörte Kirche), since it was taken over by Nazi-submissive German Christians, who gained a majority in the synod by the unconstitutional election imposed by Hitler on 23 July 1933. Nazi opponents formed the Confessing Church of Schleswig-Holstein.
1920	2008	Thuringian Evangelical Church; German: Thüringer evangelische Kirche	Lutheran	1,384,000 parishioners (1922) the State of Thuringia in its borders of 1920, until 1934 except of the areas comprising the former Principality of Reuss Elder Line. In 1934 the Reuss elder line church body merged in the Thuringia church body.	This new church body was a merger of first seven, since 1934 eight church bodies of the Thuringian monarchies (such as Reuss Elder Line, Reuss Junior Line, Saxe-Altenburg, Saxe-Gotha, Saxe-Meiningen, Grand Duchy of Saxony, Schwarzburg-Rudolstadt, and Schwarzburg-Sondershausen). The official Thuringia church body became a very radical destroyed church (German: zerstörte Kirche), since it was taken over by Nazi-submissive German Christians, who gained a majority in the synod by the unconstitutional election imposed by Hitler on 23 July 1933. Nazi opponents formed the Confessing Church of Thuringia.
1873	1934	Waldeck and Pyrmont; Evangelical State Church of Waldeck and Pyrmont; German: Evangelische Landeskirche von Waldeck und Pyrmont	United in administration	65,000 parishioners (1922); Free State of Waldeck-Pyrmont, since 1929 part of the Free State of Prussia as the District of Waldeck and the District of Pyrmont. Some small northern exclaves with Pyrmont in today's Lower Saxony were ceded in the 1920s to the Hanover Lutheran church body.	The official Waldeck church body became a destroyed church (German: zerstörte Kirche), since it was taken over by Nazi-submissive German Christians, who gained a majority in the synod by the unconstitutional election imposed by Hitler on 23 July 1933. However, a merger, planned since 1926, with the Frankfurt, Hesse state and Nassau church bodies failed after quarrels about their Nazi radicalism. In 1934 the Waldeck church body merged in the Evangelical Church of Electoral Hesse-Waldeck.
1870	persisting	Württemberg; Evangelical State Church in Württemberg; German: Evangelische Landeskirche in Württemberg	Lutheran	1,668,000 parishioners (1922); Free People's State of Württemberg	The Württemberg official church body remained an intact church (German: intakte Kirche), since the Nazi-submissive German Christians remained a minority in the synod after the unconstitutional election imposed by Hitler on 23 July 1933. Nazi opponents of the Confessing Church could act within the church body.

=== List of Landeskirchen after 1945 with changes until 2012 ===
Those of the following Landeskirchen, which existed in 1948, founded the new Protestant umbrella Evangelical Church in Germany (German: Evangelische Kirche in Deutschland). However, following the violations of the church constitutions under Nazi reign many church bodies did not simply return to the pre-1933 status quo, but introduced altered or new church constitutions – usually after lengthy synodal procedures of decision-taking -, often including an altered name of the church body. In a process starting in June 1945 and ending in 1953 the Evangelical Church of the old-Prussian Union transformed from an integrated church body, subdivided into ecclesiastical provinces, into an umbrella-like church body, renamed into Evangelical Church of the Union under political pressure of communist East Germany in 1953.

The six old-Prussian ecclesiastical provinces (Kirchenprovinz[en], sg.[pl.]), which were not or not completely abolished by the expulsion of its parishioners from the Polish and Soviet annexed German territories, assumed independence as Landeskirchen of their own between 1945 and 1948, however, simultaneously remaining member churches within the Evangelical Church of the (old-Prussian) Union, thus rather converted into an umbrella. The communist dictatorship in East Germany imposed further name changes and administrative reorganisations along the inner German borders. This was reversed after unification.

There were mergers of church bodies in 1947, 1977, 1989, 2004, 2009, and 2012, and likely more are to come. The German demographic crisis and rising irreligionism influence them, especially in former East Germany. The first date given before every entry in the table below refers to the year, when the respective church body was constituted. Such a date of constitution is somewhat difficult to fix for the 19th century, when church constitutions were reformed and came into effect, which usually provided for more or less state-independent legislative and executive bodies more or less elected by parishioners. The Protestant Reformation and some church organisation of course existed long before.

For the last and this century the given years refer to the formal establishment of the respective church body. The second date refers to the year, when the respective church body ceased to exist (if so), due to a merger or unwinding. The third entry gives the name of each church body alphabetically assorted by the first territorial entity mentioned in the name. This makes sense because Landeskirchen have clear regional demarcations, therefore usually somehow mentioned in their names. The post-war German church bodies, listed below, have never existed all in the same time. The very independent and autonomous organisational structure of German Protestantism provides for unconcerted developments. One can assort the table below alphabetically or chronogically by clicking on the button with the gyronny of four.

Consti- tuted in	Merged in	Name of the church body	Denomination	Territorial ambit	Remarks
19th century	persisting	Anhalt; Evangelical State Church of Anhalt; German: Evangelische Landeskirche Anhalts	United by confession	the former Free State of Anhalt	Between 1960 and 2003 the Anhalt church was a member of the Evangelical Church of the Union. The Church body comprises only congregations of united confession.
1821	persisting	Baden; Evangelical State Church in Baden; German: Evangelische Landeskirche in Baden abbreviation: EKiBa	United by confession	the former Republic of Baden	The new name replaced the prior United Evangelical Protestant State Church of Baden. The Church body comprises only congregations of united confession.
1809	persisting	Bavaria; Evangelical Lutheran Church in Bavaria; German: Evangelisch-Lutherische Kirche in Bayern abbreviation: ELKB	Lutheran	Free State of Bavaria	The prior name extension right of the river Rhine was skipped in 1948, after Bavaria left of the river Rhine, i.e. Governorate of the Palatinate, had been seceded from Bavaria by the Allies in 1945.
1989	persisting	Bavaria and Northwestern Germany; Evangelical Reformed Church - Synod of Reformed Churches in Bavaria and Northwestern Germany; German: Evangelisch-reformierte Kirche – Synode evangelisch-reformierter Kirchen in Bayern und Nordwestdeutschland	Reformed	Bavaria, Hamburg, Lower Saxony, former Mecklenburg in its borders of 1936, Saxony (state), and Schleswig-Holstein.	Merger of the Evangelical Reformed Church in Bavaria and the Evangelical Reformed Church in Northwestern Germany
1948	2003	Berlin and Brandenburg; Evangelical Church in Berlin-Brandenburg; German: Evangelische Kirche in Berlin-Brandenburg abbreviation: EKiBB	United in administration.	East Berlin, West Berlin, and Brandenburg (in its borders of 1945–1952, thus without Polish-annexed eastern Brandenburg and territorial redeployments after the re-establishment of the state in 1990); In 1972 the church body installed double administrative structures for West Berlin on the one hand and for East Berlin and the parishes in the 1952-abolished state of Brandenburg on the other hand, because communist East Germany did not allow pastors and church functionaries travelling freely between East and West. The two administrations reunited in 1991.	The new name replaced the prior March of Brandenburg ecclesiastical province (Kirchenprovinz Mark Brandenburg) in 1948, when this old-Prussian ecclesiastical province assumed independence as Landeskirche. The new name reflected the fact, that Berlin was no part of Brandenburg state at that time. Between 1948 and 2003 the Berlin-Brandenburg church was a member of the Evangelical Church of the (old-Prussian) Union. In 2004 the Berlin-Brandenburg church body merged into the Evangelical Church Berlin-Brandenburg-Silesian Upper Lusatia. The church body comprised mostly Lutheran and few Reformed and united congregations.
2004	persisting	Berlin, Brandenburg, and Silesian Upper Lusatia; Evangelical Church Berlin-Brandenburg-Silesian Upper Lusatia; German: Evangelische Kirche Berlin-Brandenburg-Schlesische Oberlausitz abbreviation: EKBO	United in administration.	Berlin, Brandenburg (in its borders of 1945–1952), and the German remainder of Silesia (mostly Saxon today), after the post-war Polish annexation of main part Silesia	The church body comprises mostly Lutheran and few Reformed and united congregations.
1877	persisting	Bremian Evangelical Church; German: Bremische Evangelische Kirche abbreviation: BEK	United in administration	Bremen city and one united congregation in the historical centre of Bremerhaven, whose other Lutheran parishes belong to the Hanoveran church body	The church body comprises mostly Reformed and less Lutheran congregations and one united congregation.
1872	persisting	Brunswick; Evangelical Lutheran State Church in Brunswick; German: Evangelisch-Lutherische Landeskirche in Braunschweig	Lutheran	former Free State of Brunswick; In 1977 the Brunswick church body conveyed its tasks for its East German parishes to the East German Saxony Province church body. In 1992 the eastern parishes returned to the Brunswick church body.	The new name replaced the prior Brunswickian Evangelical Lutheran State Church in 1970, after considerations, that the church body is rather a Christian than an organisation related to the Brunswickian state. After a British-Soviet boundary adjustment between the British Zone and the Soviet Zone in July 1945 the formerly Brunswickian salients (e.g. the eastern part of Blankenburg District, Hessen am Fallstein) and the exclave of Calvörde became part of the Soviet zone. This did not affect the ecclesiastical affiliation. However, East Germany's sealing off its western border and its very restrictive granting of entry and exit visas made cross-border travelling for easterners almost impossible and difficult for westerners. In 1957 East Germany forbade further contact of the East German Brunswickian parishes with the western-based Brunswick church body on the pretense that the latter co-operated with enimical western NATO forces, following a concordat of the Brunswick church body on military chaplains for the Bundeswehr.
1921	1976	Eutin; Evangelical Lutheran State Church of Eutin; German: Evangelisch-Lutherische Landeskirche Eutin	Lutheran	the District of Eutin in Schleswig-Holstein	The new name replaced the prior Evangelical Lutheran State Church of the Oldenburgian Region of Lübeck, reflecting the fact, that Oldenburg had ceded its exclave Region of Lübeck to the Prussian Schleswig-Holstein province following the Greater Hamburg Act in 1937. On 1 January 1977 the Eutin church body merged into the North Elbian Evangelical Lutheran Church.
1922; 1945 restored	1933 de facto 1947	Frankfurt upon Main; Evangelical State Church of Frankfurt upon Main; German: Evangelische Landeskirche Frankfurt am Main	United in administration	the formerly Free City of Frankfurt upon Main, 1945–1946 part of Greater Hesse and of Hesse since.	The Frankfurt church body was restored after the end of the war, since the lawfulness of the September-1933 merger into the Evangelical State Church in Hesse-Nassau was doubted due to the influence of the Nazis and the Nazi-submissive German Christians, gained by the unconstitutional re-election of all synods and presbyteries ordered by Hitler in July 1933. In September 1947 a freely and constitutionally elected synod decided on the merger into the Evangelical Church in Hesse and Nassau
1870	1976	Hamburg; Evangelical Lutheran Church in the Hamburgian State; German: Evangelisch-Lutherische Kirche im Hamburgischen Staate	Lutheran	Free and Hanseatic City of Hamburg in its borders before the Greater Hamburg Act became effective on 1 April 1937, thus including Hamburg's former exclaves such as Cuxhaven, Geesthacht, and Großhansdorf, but without today's boroughs of Altona, Harburg, Wandsbek and further formerly Holsatian municipalities in the North Borough.	On 1 January 1977 the Hamburg church body merged into the North Elbian Evangelical Lutheran Church.
1864	persisting	Hanover; Evangelical Lutheran State Church of Hanover; German: Evangelisch-lutherische Landeskirche Hannovers	Lutheran	former Prussian Province of Hanover, in 1977 reduced for those parishes located in the Harburg area of Hanover province, which had been ceded to Hamburg in 1937 and increased by the parishes in Cuxhaven, which had been ceded from Hamburg to Hanover province on the same occasion by the Greater Hamburg Act.	
1934	persisting	Hesse Electorate and Waldeck; Evangelical Church of Electoral Hesse-Waldeck; German: Evangelische Kirche von Kurhessen-Waldeck abbreviation: EKKW	United in administration	the former Electorate of Hesse, except of some small northern exclaves in today's Lower Saxony, and the former Free State of Waldeck-Pyrmont, except of the Pyrmont exclaves, thus still including the exclave of Schmalkalden (Smalkald) in formerly East Germany and today's Free State of Thuringia.	Between 1949 and 1989 the East German communist government inflicted similar problems onto the East German parishes of the Electoral Hesse-Waldeck church body as onto the eastern parishes of Brunswick church body.
19th century 1945 restored	1933 de facto 1947	Hesse state Evangelical Church in Hesse; German: Evangelische Kirche in Hessen	United in administration	former People's State of Hesse	The Hesse church body was restored after the end of the war, since the lawfulness of the September-1933 merger into the Evangelical State Church in Hesse-Nassau was doubted due to the influence of the Nazis and the Nazi-submissive German Christians, gained by the unconstitutional re-election of all synods and presbyteries ordered by Hitler in July 1933. In September 1947 a freely and constitutionally elected synod decided on the merger into the Evangelical Church in Hesse and Nassau
1947	persisting	Hesse and Nassau; Evangelical Church in Hesse and Nassau; German: Evangelische Kirche in Hessen und Nassau abbreviation: EKHN	United in administration	formerly Free City of Frankfurt upon Main, former People's State of Hesse, former Duchy of Nassau, covered by today's states of Hesse and Rhineland-Palatinate	Merger of the Frankfurt, Hesse state, and Nassau church bodies
1877	persisting	Lippe State Church; German: Lippische Landeskirche	Reformed	former Free State of Lippe	Few Lutheran congregations have their own organisations within the else Reformed Lippe church body.
1895	1976	Lübeck; Evangelical Lutheran Church in Lübeck; German: Evangelisch-Lutherische Kirche in Lübeck	Lutheran	former Free and Hanseatic City of Lübeck	The new name replaced the prior Evangelical Lutheran Church in the Lübeckian State, accounting for Lübeck's statehood being abolished by the Greater Hamburg Act in 1937. On 1 January 1977 the Lübeck church body merged into the North Elbian Evangelical Lutheran Church.
1934	2012	Mecklenburg; Evangelical Lutheran State Church of Mecklenburg; German: Evangelisch-lutherische Landeskirche Mecklenburgs abbreviation: ELLM	Lutheran	former Mecklenburg in its borders of 1936; Communist East Germany's sealing off its western border and its very restrictive granting of entry and exit visas made cross-border travelling for easterners almost impossible and difficult for westerners. So the Mecklenburg church body conveyed its tasks as to its western parishes to the Evangelical Lutheran Church of Schleswig-Holstein and its successor North Elbian Evangelical Lutheran Church. After unification the conveyed parishes decided not to return to their original Mecklenburg church body, personally and financially terribly weakened during East German dictatorship. In 2012 the Mecklenburg church body merged in the new Evangelical Lutheran Church in Northern Germany.	After a British-Soviet boundary adjustment between the British Zone and the Soviet Zone of occupation in Germany following the Barber Lyashchenko Agreement in November 1945 the parishes of Ratzeburg Cathedral and Bäk, Mechow, Römnitz, and Ziethen became part of the British zone. This did not affect the ecclesiastical affiliation. So the Mecklenburg church body retains a stake as co-owner in the historically important Ratzeburg Cathedral.
2009	persisting	Middle Germany; Evangelical Church in Middle Germany; German: Evangelische Kirche in Mitteldeutschland abbreviation: EKM	United in administration	former Province of Saxony and the State of Thuringia in its borders of 1920.	Merger of the Saxony province and Thuringia church bodies.
1866; 1945 restored	1933 de facto 1947	Nassau; Evangelical State Church in Nassau; German: Evangelische Landeskirche in Nassau	United in administration	former Duchy of Nassau, since 1945 split between Greater Hesse (and its successor Hesse) and Rhineland-Palatinate	The Hesse church body was restored after the end of the war, since the lawfulness of the September-1933 merger into the Evangelical State Church in Hesse-Nassau was doubted due to the influence of the Nazis and the Nazi-submissive German Christians, gained by the unconstitutional re-election of all synods and presbyteries ordered by Hitler in July 1933. In September 1947 a freely and constitutionally elected synod decided on the merger into the Evangelical Church in Hesse and Nassau
1977	2012	North Elbian Evangelical Lutheran Church; German: Nordelbische Evangelisch-Lutherische Kirche abbreviation: NEK	Lutheran	Hamburg and Schleswig-Holstein	Merger of Eutin, Hamburg, Lübeck and Schleswig-Holstein church bodies. In 2012 the North Elbian church body merged in the new Evangelical Lutheran Church in Northern Germany.
2012	persisting	Northern Germany; Evangelical Lutheran Church in Northern Germany; German: Evangelisch-Lutherische Kirche in Norddeutschland abbreviation: Nordkirche	Lutheran	Hamburg, Mecklenburg-Vorpommern and Schleswig-Holstein	Merger of Mecklenburg, North Elbian, and Pomeranian church bodies.
1882	1989	Northwestern Germany; Evangelical Reformed Church in Northwestern Germany; German: Evangelisch-reformierte Kirche in Nordwestdeutschland	Reformed	the former Prussian Province of Hanover and some Reformed parishes in Hamburg and Schleswig-Holstein	The new name replaced the prior Evangelical Reformed State Church of the Province of Hanover in 1949, considering the accession of parishes outside of Hanover province (since 1923) and the latter's merger into Lower Saxony in 1946. In 1989 the Evangelical Reformed Church in Northwestern Germany merged into the Evangelical Reformed Church
19th century	persisting	Oldenburg; Evangelical Lutheran Church in Oldenburg; German: Evangelisch-lutherische Kirche in Oldenburg	Lutheran	former Free State of Oldenburg except of its exclaves of Birkenfeld and Region of Lübeck	
1848	persisting	Palatinate; Evangelical Church of the Palatinate (Protestant State Church); German: Evangelische Kirche der Pfalz (Protestantische Landeskirche)	United by confession	the formerly Bavarian Governorate of the Palatinate since 1945 divided between Rhineland-Palatinate and the Saar Protectorate (and its successor Saarland, as of 1957).	The new name replaced the prior United Protestant Evangelical Christian Church of the Palatinate (Palatine State Church) in 1976. Since the parishioners' plebiscite in 1817 all Palatine congregations are confessionally united.
1947	2012	Pomeranian Evangelical Church; German: Pommersche Evangelische Kirche, abbreviation: PEK	United in administration	German Hither Pomerania	The new name replaced the prior Pomerania ecclesiastical province (Kirchenprovinz Pommern) in 1947, when this old-Prussian ecclesiastical province assumed independence as Landeskirche. Between 1947 and 2003 the Pomerania church body was a member of the Evangelical Church of the (old-Prussian) Union. In 1968 communist East Germany ordered the church body to skip the term Pomerania from its name, then it chose the name Evangelical Church in Greifswald (German: Evangelische Kirche in Greifswald). The original name was readopted in 1990. In 2012 the Pomeranian church body merged in the new Evangelical Lutheran Church in Northern Germany.
1948	persisting	Rhineland; Evangelical Church in the Rhineland; German: Evangelische Kirche im Rheinland abbreviation: EKiR	United in administration	former Rhine Province (in its borders of 1938)	The new name replaced the prior Rhineland ecclesiastical province (Kirchenprovinz Rheinland) in 1948, when this old-Prussian ecclesiastical province assumed independence as Landeskirche. Between 1948 and 2003 the Rhineland church body was a member of the Evangelical Church of the (old-Prussian) Union.
1868	persisting	Saxony state Evangelical Lutheran State Church of Saxony; German: Evangelisch-lutherische Landeskirche Sachsens abbreviation: EvLKS	Lutheran	former Kingdom of Saxony except of the small area annexed to Poland in 1945 (modern Saxon Free State territory differs considerably more).	The new name replaced the prior Evangelical Lutheran State Church of the Free State of Saxony since the Free State had been abolished in 1952, only to be re-established in 1990, which did not cause another name change.
1947	2008	Saxony province Evangelical Church of the Saxony Ecclesiastical Province; German: Evangelische Kirche der Kirchenprovinz Sachsen	United in administration	former Province of Saxony.	The new name extended the prior Saxony ecclesiastical province (Kirchenprovinz Sachsen) in 1947, when this old-Prussian ecclesiastical province assumed independence as Landeskirche. Between 1947 and 2003 the church body of the Saxony Ecclesiastical Province was a member of the Evangelical Church of the (old-Prussian) Union. On 1 January 2009 the church body of the Saxony Ecclesiastical Province merged into the Evangelical Church in Middle Germany.
19th century	persisting	Schaumburg-Lippe; Evangelical Lutheran State Church of Schaumburg-Lippe; German: Evangelisch-lutherische Landeskirche von Schaumburg-Lippe	Lutheran	former Free State of Schaumburg-Lippe	Any claim to merge the tiny Schaumburg-Lippe church body has been refused so far based on a solid self-confidence, also laid during the Nazi era, when this church body became the only one in 1936, which staffed all its executive board only with partisans of the Nazi-opponent Confessing Church.
1867	1976	Schleswig-Holstein; Evangelical Lutheran Church of Schleswig-Holstein (German: Evangelisch-Lutherische Landeskirche Schleswig-Holsteins)	Lutheran	former Province of Schleswig-Holstein in its borders of 1936	On 1 January 1977 the Schleswig-Holstein church body merged into the North Elbian Evangelical Lutheran Church.
1947	2003	Silesia (n Upper Lusatia); Evangelical Church of Silesia(n Upper Lusatia); German: Evangelische Kirche von Schlesien (/der schlesischen Oberlausitz) abbreviation: EKsOL	United in administration	the German remainder of Silesia, after the post-war Polish annexation of main part Silesia	The new name replaced the prior Silesia ecclesiastical province (Kirchenprovinz Schlesien) in 1947, when this old-Prussian ecclesiastical province assumed independence as Landeskirche. Between 1947 and 2003 the Silesia church body was a member of the Evangelical Church of the (old-Prussian) Union. In 1968 communist East Germany ordered the church body to skip the term Silesia from its name, then it chose the name Evangelical Church of the Görlitz Ecclesiastical Region (German: Evangelische Kirche des Görlitzer Kirchengebiets). In 1992 the Silesia church body dropped its unwanted name and chose the new name of Evangelical Church of Silesian Upper Lusatia. On 1 January 2004 the Silesia church body merged into the Evangelical Church Berlin-Brandenburg-Silesian Upper Lusatia.
1920	2008	Thuringia; Evangelical Lutheran Church in Thuringia; German: Evangelisch-Lutherische Kirche in Thüringen abbreviation: ELKTh	Lutheran	the State of Thuringia in its borders of 1920	The new name replaced the prior Thuringian Evangelical Church in 1948. On 1 January 2009 the church body merged into the Evangelical Church in Middle Germany.
1817	2003	Union; Evangelical Church of the Union; German: Evangelische Kirche der Union abbreviation: EKU	United in administration	Berlin, Brandenburg (in its borders of 1946–1952), German Hither Pomerania, former Hohenzollern province (ceded to Württemberg church body in 1950), former Rhine Province (in its borders of 1938), former Province of Saxony (in its borders of 1938), post-war German part of former Silesia province, former Westphalia (in its borders of 1815–1946), as well as the Saarland, except of its eastern formerly Palatine districts.	The new name replaced the prior Evangelical Church of the old-Prussian Union in 1953, after the communist dictatorship in East Germany insisted on skipping the name element Prussia. Between 1948 and 2003 EKU was rather an umbrella, though running an own synod and executive body. Therefore, it was an equal member of the Evangelical Church in Germany (EKD), even though all of EKU's member churches were simultaneously members of EKD on their own. The church was merged into the mere umbrella Union of Evangelical Churches.
1945	persisting	Westphalia; Evangelical Church of Westphalia; German: Evangelische Kirche von Westfalen abbreviation: EkvW	United in administration	former Province of Westphalia (in its borders of 1815–1945)	The new name replaced the prior Westphalia ecclesiastical province (Kirchenprovinz Westfalen) in 1945, when this old-Prussian ecclesiastical province assumed independence as Landeskirche. Between 1945 and 2003 the Westphalia church body was a member of the Evangelical Church of the (old-Prussian) Union.
1870	persisting	Württemberg; Evangelical State Church in Württemberg; German: Evangelische Landeskirche in Württemberg	Lutheran	former Free People's State of Württemberg plus former Province of Hohenzollern (as of 1950)	

=== List of further Protestant church bodies in Germany ===
This is a list of more Protestant church bodies, which were not members of the German Federation of Protestant Churches

1. - 1918–1989: Evangelical Reformed Church in Bavaria (German: Evangelisch-reformierte Kirche in Bayern, the Reformed parishes before included in the Lutheran Bavarian church body seceded and formed their own church body in 1918. In 1989 Evangelical Reformed Church in Bavaria merged into the Evangelical Reformed Church - Synod of Reformed Churches in Bavaria and Northwestern Germany (German: Evangelisch-reformierte Kirche – Synode evangelisch-reformierter Kirchen in Bayern und Nordwestdeutschland) – Territory: then the Free State of Bavaria right of the river Rhine
2. - Lower Saxon Confederation (Reformed, German: Niedersächsische Konföderation) – Territory: Calvinist congregations, mostly of Huguenot foundation, in the Free State of Brunswick, the Free and Hanseatic Cities of Hamburg and Lübeck and the Prussian Province of Hanover.

=== List of today's Landeskirchen ===
For a list of today's Protestant Landeskirchen in Germany see their umbrella Protestant Church in Germany.

== In Switzerland ==
Switzerland has no country-wide state religion, though most of the cantons (except for Geneva and Neuchâtel) recognise official Landeskirchen, in all cases including the Roman Catholic Church and the Swiss Reformed Church. These churches, and in some cantons also the Old Catholic Church and Jewish congregations, are financed by official taxation of adherents.

=== Roman Catholic cantonal churches ===
In most cantons the Roman Catholic congregations are organised in cantonal church bodies which form statutory corporations with executive and supervising bodies elected by their parishioners. Roman Catholic Landeskirchen developed from denominationally separate committees of the cantonal governments in cantons with populations of mixed denomination, such as Aargau, Graubünden, St. Gallen and Thurgau. These separate government committees, competent for ecclesiastical matters of the respective denomination and founded in the 16th and 17th century, were sometimes called Corpus Catholicorum (for the Roman Catholics, with the equivalent Corpus Evangelicorum for the Reformed Protestants).

In other cantons with predominantly Reformed population, Roman Catholic Landeskirchen were founded after World War II (except for Bern whose Roman Catholic Regional Church had already been established in 1939), paralleling the long established Reformed Landeskirchen in those cantons and accounting for the recognition of Roman Catholicism as an equivalent denomination. Cantons of prevailingly Roman Catholic population then followed that example, first the Lucerne.

Church buildings and other real estate, religious schools, religious charitable organisations and religious counselling centres are often owned, run and financed by the funds of the cantonally competent Roman Catholic church body. Since each has executive and legislative bodies, elected by its statutory members (i.e. the parishioners of age), each Roman Catholic church body is accepted as a democratic entity entitled to levy member fees (also by way of a church tax), because the usage of the funds is decided by the elected representatives of those who defray them.

According to Roman Catholic doctrine the Roman Catholic church bodies are not churches, since there is only one hierarchic church. Therefore, some Roman Catholics oppose the Roman Catholic Landeskirchen as para-ecclesiastical entities paralleling the actual Roman Catholic church, while many others support the idea since they offer Roman Catholics similar opportunities to participate in church life like the Reformed Landeskirchen.

Some cantonal church bodies bear the name Landeskirche in their name, others are called a synod, federation or association of congregations or simply Catholic Church of the respective Canton. Whereas the term Landeskirche actually implies that the body is a separate denomination, the term cantonal church would be more appropriate for Roman Catholic regional church bodies, since they form a cantonally delineated corporation of the Roman Catholic parishioners within a canton but are cooperating and providing services to their members, who in the canonical sense remain members of the Roman Catholic Church pastoring them by its respective diocese.

The Roman Catholic cantonal church bodies form part of the Roman Catholic Central Conference of Switzerland (RKZ, official names in German: Römisch-Katholische Zentralkonferenz der Schweiz, French: Conférence centrale catholique romaine de Suisse, Italian: Conferenza centrale cattolica romana della Svizzera, Romansh: Conferenza centrala catolica romana da la Svizra).

==== List of Roman Catholic Landeskirchen ====
Landeskirche or cantonal church body	Chairperson	Canton and area (km^{2})	Congregations	administrative seat
Roman Catholic Church in Aargau; Römisch-katholische Kirche im Aargau	Luc Humbel, titled President of the Church Council	Aargau; 1,404	93	Aarau
Catholic Congregations of Inner Rhodes; Katholische Kirchgemeinden Innerrhodens		Appenzell Innerrhoden; 173	7	Gonten
Association of Roman Catholic Congregations in the Canton of Appenzell Outer Rhodes; Verband römisch-katholischer Kirchgemeinden des Kantons Appenzell-Ausserrhoden		Appenzell Ausserrhoden; 243	9	Herisau
Roman Catholic Church of the Canton of Basel City; Römisch-katholische Kirche des Kantons Basel-Stadt		Basel City; 37	11	Basel
Roman Catholic Regional Church of the Canton of Basel-Landschaft; Römisch-katholische Landeskirche des Kantons Basel-Landschaft		Basel-Landschaft; 518	32	Liestal
Roman Catholic Regional Church of the Canton of Bern; Römisch-katholische Landeskirche des Kantons Bern / Église nationale catholique romaine du canton de Bern		Bern; 5,959	33	Biel/Bienne
Catholic Ecclesiastic Corporation of the Canton of Fribourg; Corporation ecclésiastique catholique du canton de Fribourg / Katholische Kirchliche Körperschaft des Kantons Freiburg		Fribourg; 1,671	144	Villars-sur-Glâne
Roman Catholic Church of Geneva; Église catholique romaine - Genève		Geneva; 282	55	Geneva
Association of the Roman Catholic Congregations of the Canton of Glarus; Verband der römisch-katholischen Kirchgemeinden des Kantons Glarus		Glarus; 685	6	Näfels
Catholic Cantonal Church of Graubünden; Katholische Landeskirche Graubünden / Chiesa cattolica dello Stato dei Grigioni / Baselgia chantunala catolica dal Grischun / Corpus Catholicorum Rætiæ		Grisons; 7,105	131	Domat/Ems
Cantonal Roman Catholic Ecclesiastic Entity of the Republic and Canton of Jura; Collectivité ecclésiastique cantonale catholique-romaine de la République et Canton du Jura		Jura; 839	63	Delémont
Roman Catholic Regional Church of the Canton of Lucerne; Römisch-katholische Landeskirche des Kantons Luzern		Lucerne; 1,493	85	Lucerne
Neuchâtel Roman Catholic Federation; Fédération catholique romaine neuchâteloise		Neuchâtel; 803	19	Neuchâtel
Roman Catholic Regional Church of the Canton of Nidwalden; Römisch-katholische Landeskirche des Kantons Nidwalden		Nidwalden; 276	12	Stans
Association of the Roman Catholic Congregations of the Canton of Obwalden; Verband der römisch-katholischen Kirchgemeinden des Kantons Obwalden		Obwalden; 491	6	Sachseln
Catholic Denominational Section of the Canton of St. Gallen; Katholischer Konfessionsteil des Kantons St. Gallen		St. Gallen; 2,026	113	St. Gallen
Roman Catholic Regional Church of the Canton of Schaffhausen; Römisch-katholische Landeskirche des Kantons Schaffhausen		Schaffhausen; 298	6	Schaffhausen
Roman Catholic Synod of the Canton of Solothurn; Römisch-katholische Synode des Kantons Solothurn		Solothurn; 791	75	Gerlafingen
Catholic Regional Church of the Canton of Thurgau; Katholische Landeskirche des Kantons Thurgau		Thurgau; 991	54	Weinfelden
Roman Catholic Diocese of Lugano		Ticino; 2,812	259	Lugano
Roman Catholic Regional Church of Uri; Römisch-katholische Landeskirche Uri		Uri; 1,077	23	Attinghausen
Roman Catholic Diocese of Sion		Valais; 5,224	158	Sion
Roman Catholic Ecclesiastical Federation of the Canton of Vaud; Fédération ecclésiastique catholique romaine du Canton de Vaud		Vaud; 3,212	54	Lausanne
Union of the Catholic Congregations of the Canton of Zug; Vereinigung der katholischen Kirchgemeinden des Kantons Zug		Zug; 239	10	Cham
Roman Catholic Corporation of the Canton of Zürich; Römisch-katholische Körperschaft des Kantons Zürich		Zürich; 1,729	75	Zürich

The Roman Catholic Cantonal Church of Schwyz (Römisch-katholische Kantonalkirche Schwyz) enjoys the status of an associated guest.

== See also ==
- Evangelical Church in Germany (1945 – today)
- German Evangelical Church (1933–1945)
- Federation of Swiss Protestant Churches (1920 – today)
