= Zecher =

Zecher may refer to:

== People ==
- Linda Zecher (born 1953), American executive
- Rich Zecher (born 1943), former American football defensive tackle

== Place ==
- Klein Zecher, municipality in Schleswig-Holstein, Germany
