= Colin Barber =

British general (1897–1964)

Lieutenant-General Sir Colin Barber KBE CB DSO*
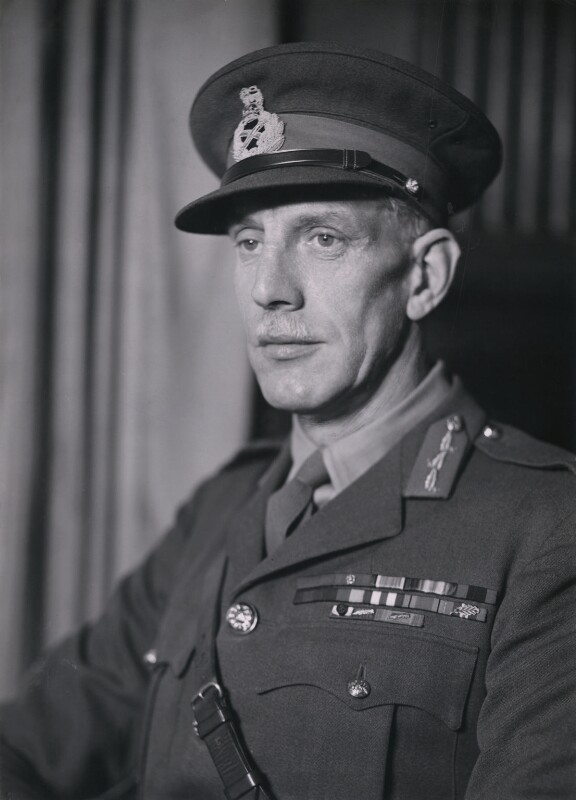
- Barber in 1949
- Born: 27 June 1897; Birkenhead, England
- Died: 5 May 1964 (aged 66); Sandwich Bay, Kent, England
- Military career
- Allegiance: United Kingdom
- Branch: British Army
- Service years: 1916–1955
- Rank: Lieutenant-General
- Nickname: "Tiny"
- Service number: 6512
- Units: King's Regiment (Liverpool); Queen's Own Cameron Highlanders
- Commands: Scottish Command; Highland District; 15th (Scottish) Infantry Division; 46th Infantry Brigade; 4th Battalion, Queen's Own Cameron Highlanders
- Conflicts: First World War; Arab revolt in Palestine; Second World War
- Awards: Knight Commander of the Order of the British Empire; Companion of the Order of the Bath; Distinguished Service Order & Bar; Mentioned in Despatches (5); Commander of the Order of the Crown (Belgium); Croix de Guerre (Belgium)

Lieutenant-General Sir Colin Muir Barber, KBE, CB, DSO & Bar (27 June 1897 – 5 May 1964) was a senior British Army officer who fought in both the First and Second World War. During the latter, he commanded the 15th (Scottish) Infantry Division across parts of the Western Front from August 1944 until the end of the war in May 1945. Standing at 6 ft 9 in (2.06 m), Barber was reputed to be the tallest officer in the British Army, and thus earned the ironic nickname "Tiny".

== Early life and military career ==
Colin Muir Barber was born in Birkenhead, Cheshire on 27 June 1897, the son of John Barber. He was educated at Uppingham School.

During World War I, he served with the British Army's Liverpool Scottish in France and Belgium. On 29 March 1918, he was commissioned as a second lieutenant into the Queen's Own Cameron Highlanders, continuing to serve in France and Belgium with the 1st Battalion until the end of the war.

== Interwar period ==
Barber continued his military service during the interwar period (1919–1939), serving in India. He was promoted to captain on 31 January 1925, and mentioned in dispatches on 13 March for his service in Waziristan. He then attended the Command and Staff College Quetta from 1929 to 1930, where he graduated with distinction. On his return to Britain, he had several staff appointments, mainly within the British Army's Scottish Command. In 1936, after a brief posting to Palestine during the early stages of the Arab revolt, he was promoted to major on 11 March 1937 and appointed to the General Staff as a General Staff Officer Grade 2 (GSO2).

== Second World War ==
In 1940, during the Second World War, he was with the 51st (Highland) Infantry Division of the British Expeditionary Force (BEF) in France, where he commanded the 4th Battalion, the Cameron Highlanders, and was awarded the Distinguished Service Order (DSO) and mentioned in dispatches again.

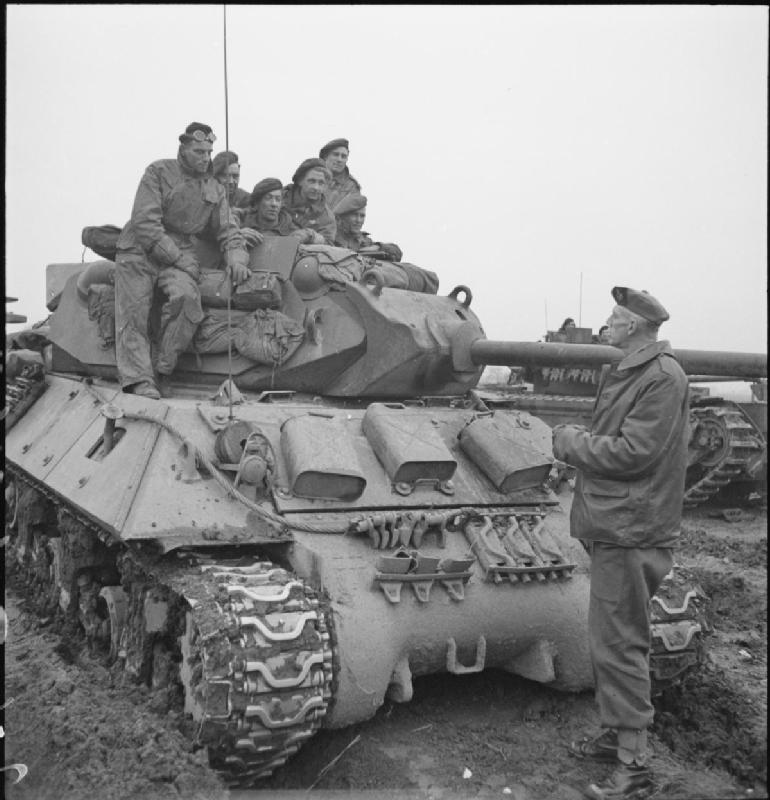
Major-General C. M. Barber in conversation with the crew of an Achilles 17-pounder tank destroyer near Goch, 20 February 1945

From March 1941, Barber returned to the General Staff as a General Staff Officer Grade 1 (GSO1), until taking command, in October, of the 46th (Highland) Infantry Brigade, leading it through the Battle of Normandy in the summer of 1944. From 3 August 1944 Barber, when he was promoted to acting major-general, he commanded the 15th (Scottish) Infantry Division for the remainder of the campaign in north-west Europe until the end of World War II in Europe in May 1945. In this campaign, the 15th Division had the distinction to lead the three great river crossings of the Seine, the Rhine and the Elbe, and Barber was awarded the bar to his DSO.

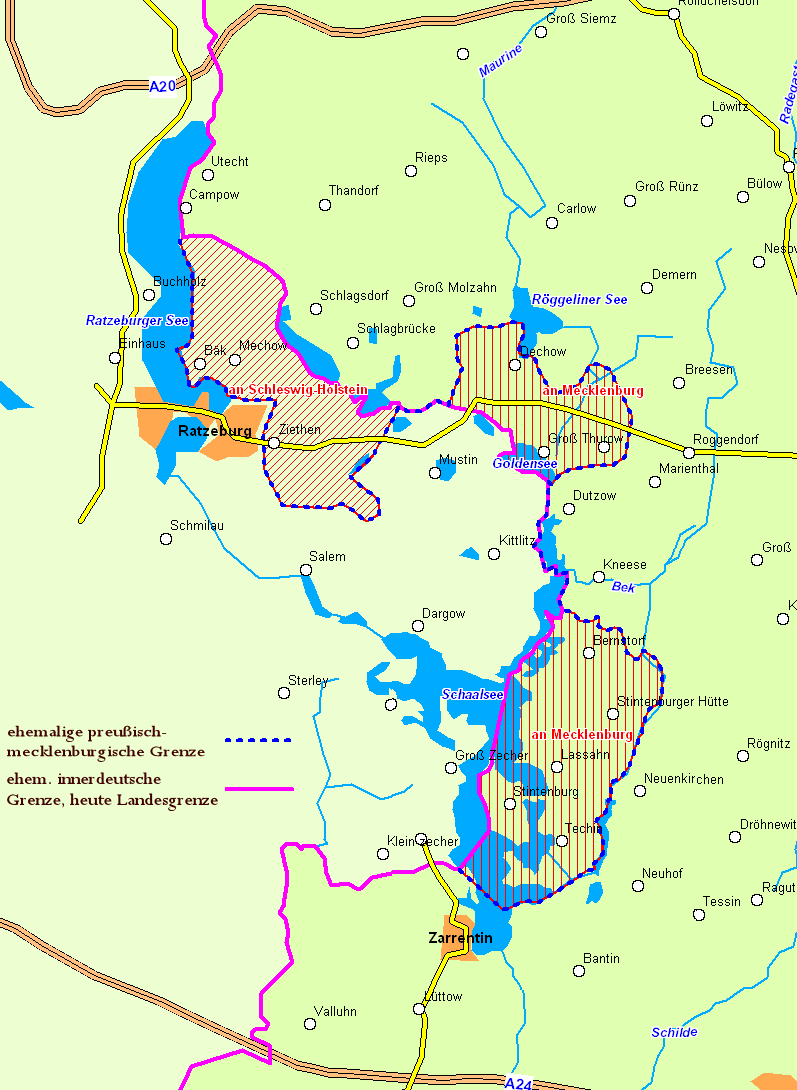
Map of territorial changes as per the Barber-Lyashchenko Agreement

On 13 November 1945, while acting as representative for the Commander-in-Chief of the British Army of the Rhine, Barber and the Soviet major-general Nikolai Grigorevich Lyashchenko signed the Barber-Lyashchenko Agreement, also known as the Gadebusch Agreement, in Gadebusch, swapping some municipalities along the northern border between the Soviet and British occupation zones of Germany. Thus, some eastern suburbs of Ratzeburg, such as Ziethen in Lauenburg, Mechow, Bäk and Römnitz became part of the Duchy of Lauenburg District (British occupation zone), while the Lauenburgian municipalities of Dechow, Groß and Klein Thurow (now component parts of Roggendorf) as well as Lassahn (now a component part of Zarrentin am Schaalsee) were ceded to the adjacent Mecklenburgian district (Soviet occupation zone). The territory swap was finalized on 26 November, and the respective occupational forces had to withdraw until 28 November to their new zonal territory. The British occupational forces organized for the evacuation of all the inhabitants of the villages to be ceded to the Soviet zone, if they so wished, including all their chattels, by providing vehicles. All displaced people (usually former forced labourers under prior Nazi rule) in these villages and other eventual foreigners – except Soviet citizens among them – were to be relocated mandatorily, while Soviet citizens would have to stay.

== Postwar ==
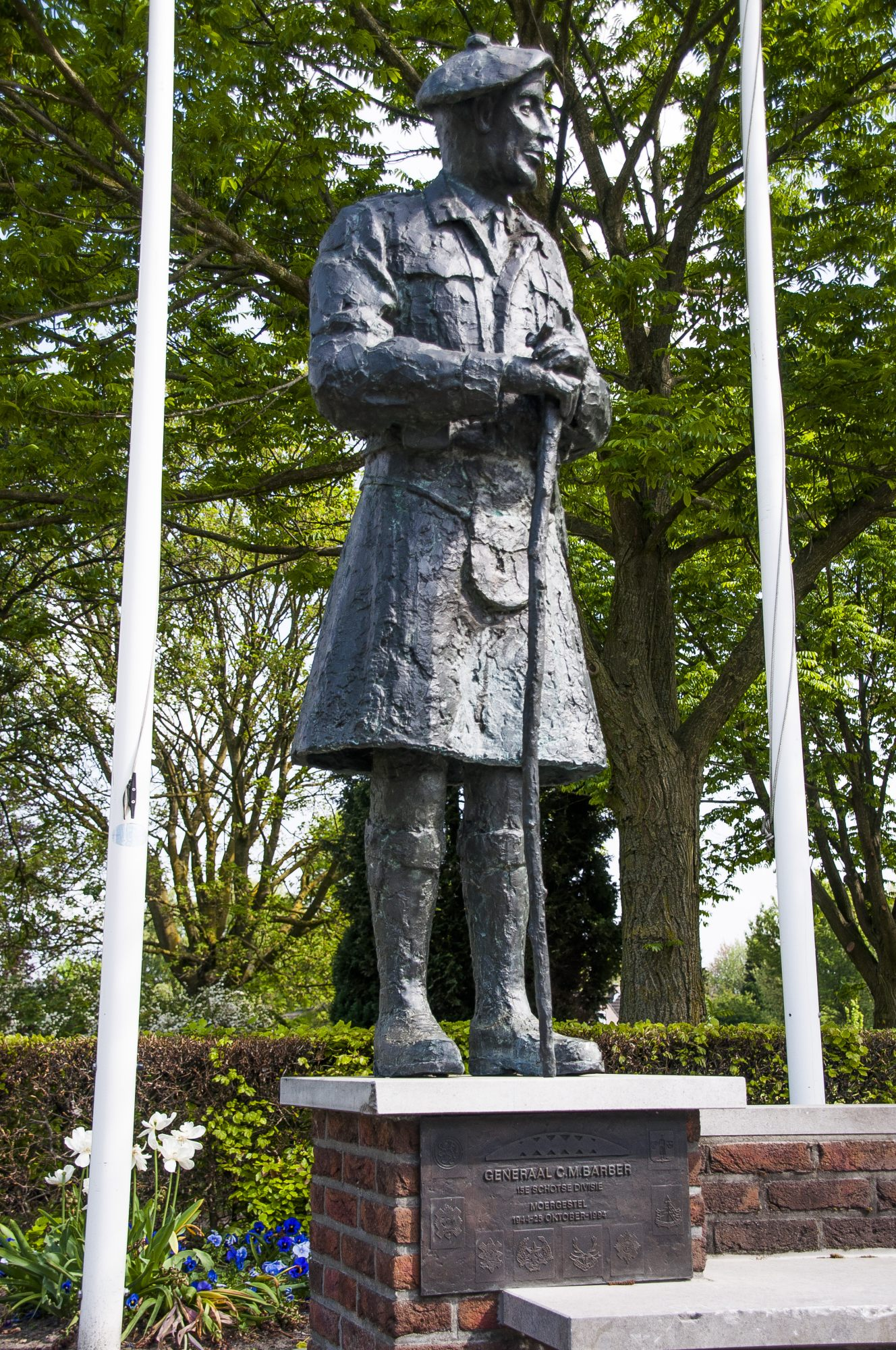
War memorial with statue of Lieutenant-General Sir Colin Barber in Moergestel, Netherlands

After the war, Barber commanded Highland District between 1946 and 1949 when he became Director of Infantry & Military Training, War Office. Barber was promoted to lieutenant-general on 27 February 1952 and made General Officer Commanding-in-Chief (GOC-in-C) of Scottish Command and Governor of Edinburgh Castle. He retired from the army on 28 March 1955.

Lieutenant-General Sir Colin Barber died on 5 May 1964. A memorial service was held at Canongate Kirk (The Kirk of Holyroodhouse) on 22 May 1964. There is a memorial plaque for Lieutenant-General Barber, as a commander in the 15th Scottish Infantry Division that liberated Tourville in June 1944.

He was married twice, first in 1929 to Mary Edith Nixon. The couple had a son and a daughter; Mary died in 1949. His second wife was Mrs Anthony Milburn.

== Bibliography ==
- Smart, Nick (2005). Biographical Dictionary of British Generals of the Second World War. Barnesley: Pen & Sword. ISBN 1844150496.

Military offices
Preceded by Gordon MacMillan	GOC 15th (Scottish) Infantry Division; 1944–1946	Division disbanded
Preceded by James Cassels	GOC 51st Highland District; 1946–1949	Succeeded by Keith Arbuthnott
Preceded by Sir Gordon MacMillan	GOC-in-C Scottish Command; 1952–1955	Succeeded by Sir Horatius Murray
