= Kulpin =

Kulpin may refer to:

- Kulpin, Germany, a municipality
- Kulpin, Serbia, a village
- Nikolay Kulpin (1968–2003), Kazakhstani boxer
