= Kittlitz =

Kittlitz may refer to:

== Places ==
- Kittlitz, Lauenburg, a municipality in the district of Lauenburg, Schleswig-Holstein, Germany
- Kittlitz, Lübbenau, a quarter of the city of Lübbenau, Brandenburg, Germany
- Kittlitz, Löbau, a quarter of the city of Löbau, Saxony, Germany
- Kytlice (German: Kittlitz), a village and municipality (obec) in the Ústí nad Labem Region, Czech Republic

== People ==
- Heinrich von Kittlitz (1799-1874), German explorer and ornithologist
