= Harmsdorf, Lauenburg =

Harmsdorf
- Municipality
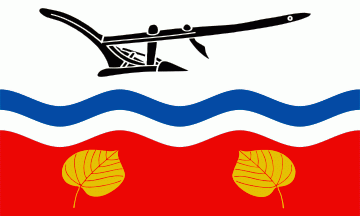
- Flag Coat of arms

- Location of Harmsdorf within Herzogtum Lauenburg district
- Interactive map of Harmsdorf
- Location within Germany Location within Schleswig-Holstein
- Coordinates: 53°42′8″N 10°43′35″E
- Country: Germany
- State: Schleswig-Holstein
- District: Herzogtum Lauenburg
- Municipal assoc.: Lauenburgische Seen

Government
  - Mayor: Hans-Heinrich Mahnke

Area
  - Total: 3.57 km^{2} (1.38 sq mi)
- Elevation: 32 m (105 ft)

Population (2025-12-31)
  - Total: 324
  - Density: 90.8/km^{2} (235/sq mi)
- Time zone: UTC+01:00 (CET)
  - Summer (DST): UTC+02:00 (CEST)
- Postal codes: 23911
- Dialling codes: 04541
- Vehicle registration: RZ
- Website: www.amt-lauenburgische-seen.de

Harmsdorf (German pronunciation: [ˈhaʁmsdɔʁf]) is a small municipality in the district of Lauenburg, in Schleswig-Holstein, Germany.
