= Horst, Lauenburg =

Horst
- Municipality
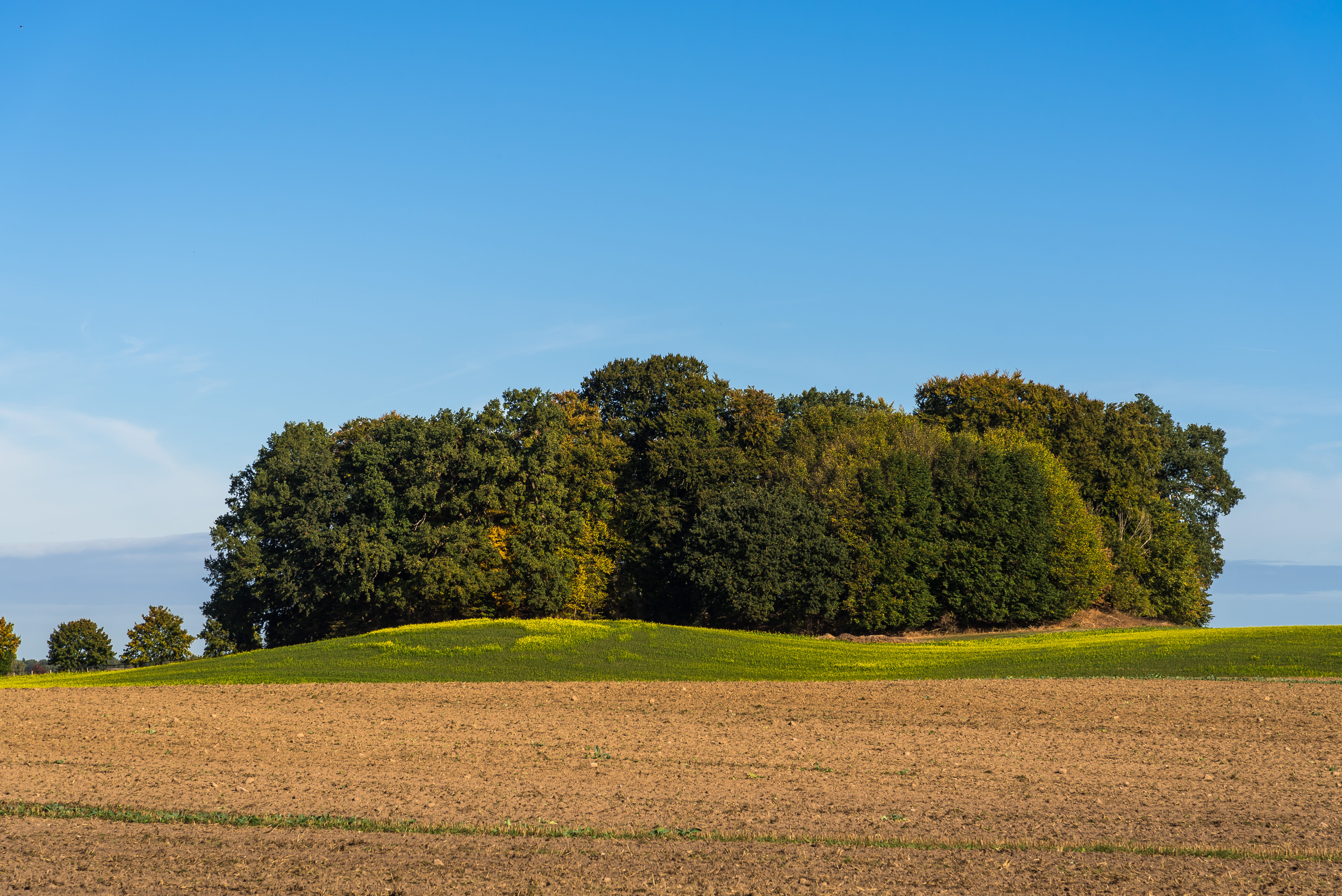

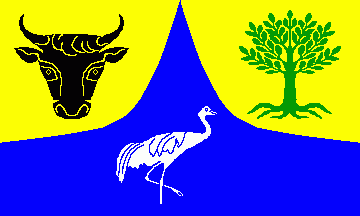
- Flag Coat of arms

- Location of Horst within Herzogtum Lauenburg district
- Interactive map of Horst
- Location within Germany Location within Schleswig-Holstein
- Coordinates: 53°38′N 10°46′E
- Country: Germany
- State: Schleswig-Holstein
- District: Herzogtum Lauenburg
- Municipal assoc.: Lauenburgische Seen

Government
  - Mayor: Günther Neuber

Area
  - Total: 12.05 km^{2} (4.65 sq mi)
- Elevation: 52 m (171 ft)

Population (2025-12-31)
  - Total: 269
  - Density: 22.3/km^{2} (57.8/sq mi)
- Time zone: UTC+01:00 (CET)
  - Summer (DST): UTC+02:00 (CEST)
- Postal codes: 23883
- Dialling codes: 04542
- Vehicle registration: RZ
- Website: www.amt-lauenburgische-seen.de

Horst (German pronunciation: [hɔʁst]) is a municipality in the district of Lauenburg, in Schleswig-Holstein, Germany.

== History ==
During excavations near Horst some Slavic relicts were found, dating back to the 7th Century.
