= Evangelical Church of Anhalt =

Protestant Church in Germany

- Evangelische Landeskirche Anhalts
- Type: Landeskirche, member of the Evangelical Church in Germany
- Classification: Protestant
- Orientation: United Protestant (Lutheran & Reformed)
- Landesbischof: Karsten Wolkenhauer:
- Associations: Union of Evangelical Churches in the EKD, World Council of Churches, Communion of Protestant Churches in Europe
- Region: 2.299 km² in Saxony-Anhalt
- Headquarters: Dessau-Roßlau, Germany
- Congregations: 145
- Members: 23,156 (2025); 9,1% of total population
- Other name: Protestant Church of Anhalt
- Official website: https://www.landeskirche-anhalts.de/service/information-in-english

The Evangelical Church of Anhalt (Evangelische Landeskirche Anhalts) is a United Protestant member church of the Evangelical Church in Germany. The church calls itself the Protestant Church of Anhalt in English. Its seat is in Dessau-Roßlau in Saxony-Anhalt, in the former duchy of Anhalt. This church is the smallest regional church in Germany in terms of membership.

The Evangelical Church of Anhalt was affiliated with 214 churches in approximately 145 parishes in central Saxony-Anhalt. In December 2025, the church had 23,156 members, making its membership the smallest among the member churches of the Evangelical Church in Germany. In 1922, by contrast, the church counted 315,000 parishioners; at the time, it was the twelfth-smallest of Germany's 28 Landeskirchen.

== History ==
The princes of Anhalt introduced the Reformation into their principalities very early on (Köthen 1525, Bernburg 1526, Dessau 1534). In the theological disputes after Martin Luther's death in 1546, the princes tried to remain neutral for a long time. Following on from the important role that Philipp Melanchthon's mediating theology played in Anhalt, and in particular in contrast to Electorate Saxony, Prince Joachim Ernest's sons converted to the Reformed denomination in 1596, initially through a liturgical reform, and then from 1606 through the introduction of the Heidelberg Catechism. After the state was divided this year, there were four reformed regional churches. In the Principality of Anhalt-Zerbst, however, a Lutheran church system had been established since 1642, with the Formula of Concord as the confessional basis. Here the Reformed residents, and in the other principalities the Lutheran residents, were allowed to freely practice their religion since 1679. They subsequently built their own churches in the residential cities and some other places.

When the German Confederation was founded in 1815, there were three sovereign Anhalt states: Anhalt-Bernburg, Anhalt-Dessau and Anhalt-Köthen; these were united in 1863 to form the Duchy of Anhalt.

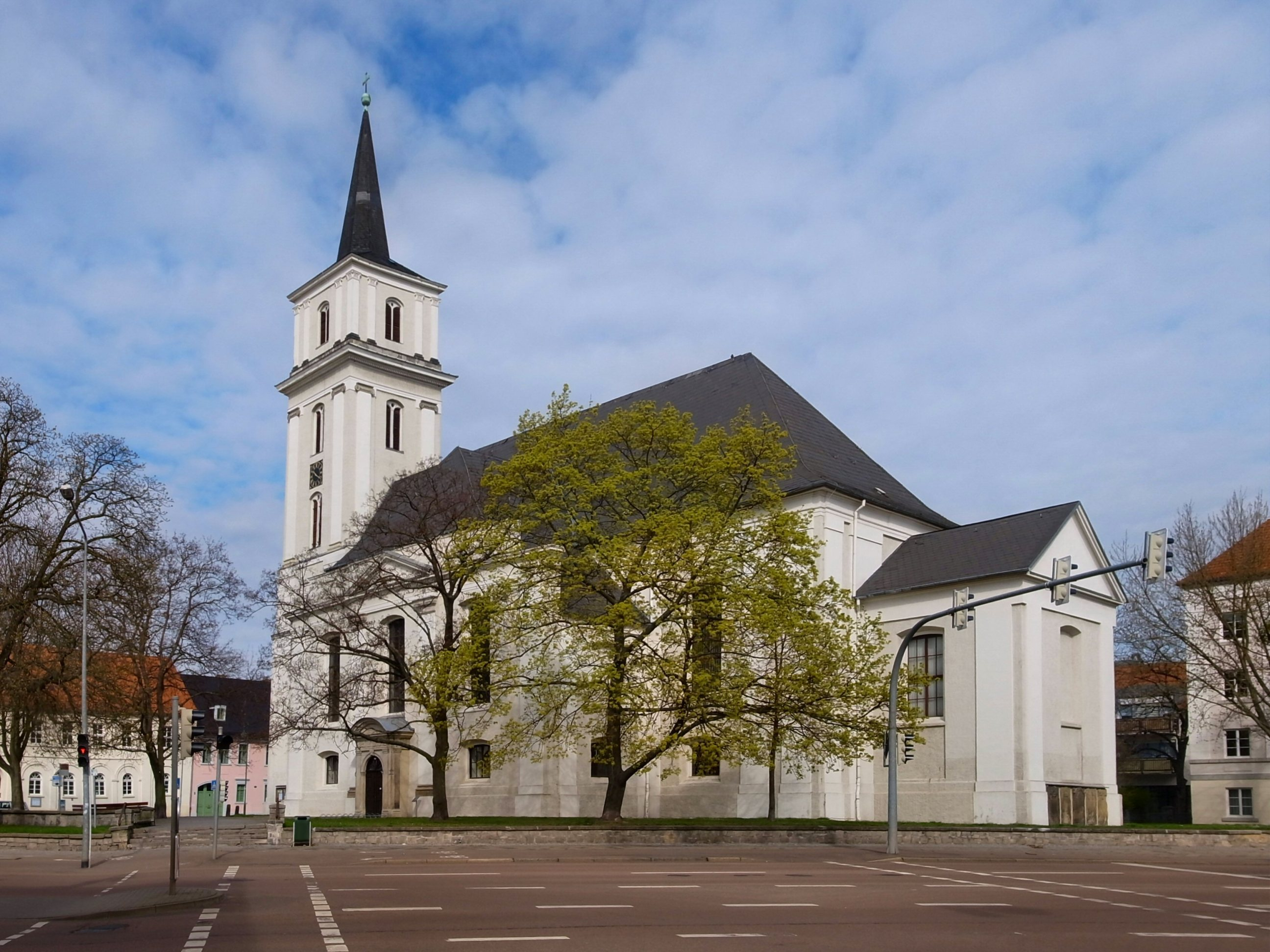
Johanniskirche in Dessau-Roßlau

In 1820 the union of Lutheran and Reformed congregations was carried out in Bernburg and in 1827 in Dessau. In Köthen, this union only took place in 1880. However, since the reunification of the Anhalt states in 1863, there had already been a unified regional church, which also received a synodal basis between 1875 and 1878.

The head of the “Evangelical Regional Church of the Duchy of Anhalt” or its predecessor churches was the sovereign as “summus episcopus”. He exercised his church government through a consistory since the late 17th century. The spiritual leadership was provided by the superintendents, who - in addition to secular government councilors - also sat in the consistory. The title of general superintendent did not arise until the late 19th century. In the November Revolution, the Duke of Anhalt had to abdicate, which meant the end of the sovereign church regime. The regional church subsequently adopted its first constitution, which came into force on August 14, 1920. At the time, it was considered the most democratic church constitution in Germany because it contained a biblical (not historical) confession as well as freedom of belief and conscience for all members, who also had very extensive rights to have a say. Since then, the people of the church have been sovereign and have determined a national synod - initially through direct election. The government of the church is formed by the regional church council, which is temporarily elected by the regional synod. The church president chairs this committee, which is made up of three to five people. This title has existed since 1957. Previously, the chairman was called Oberkirchenrat. The administrative authority of the regional church is the regional church office. In 1960 the Evangelical Regional Church of Anhalt joined the Evangelical Church of the Union. After its dissolution in 2003, she became a member of the Union of Evangelical Churches in the EKD. Between 1969 and 1991 the regional church was a member church of the Federation of Evangelical Churches in the GDR.

== Structure ==
=== Regional church office and administrative hierarchy ===
The church president has his official residence in Dessau-Roßlau. In the regional church office there, the regional church is administered by the regional church council, the permanent governing body of the church and its employees. The regional church council includes the department heads of the regional church office (they have the title “Oberkirchenrat” or “Oberkirchenratin”) as well as the church president.

In the administrative hierarchy, the regional church is structured from bottom to top as follows: At the base are the parishes as corporations under public law with elected church boards, the “parish church councils”. The members of these parish church councils are called “elders” or “parish church council”. Several parishes together form a church district (comparable to a district in terms of general administration), headed by a district pastor. The church districts are not corporations under public law and have the district synod as their body, whose members are appointed by the respective parishes. The five church districts together form the regional church.

=== Church territory ===
The territory of the Evangelical Church of Anhalt includes the former state of Anhalt, which existed until 1945 and which has since formed the state of Saxony-Anhalt with most of the former Prussian province of Kingdom of Saxony. Since the second district reform in Saxony-Anhalt, the church area includes larger parts of the districts of Anhalt-Bitterfeld and Salzlandkreis, smaller parts of the districts of Harz, Mansfeld-Südharz and Wittenberg as well as the independent city of Dessau-Roßlau. The parish of the former Anhalt exclave of Dornburg in today's Jerichower Land district was reclassified in 1982 into what was then the Evangelical Church of the Church Province of Saxony. The churches in the former exclaves of Groß- and Kleinmühlingen as well as Groß- and Kleinalsleben also belong to the resulting Evangelical Church in Central Germany. Conversely, the former Prussian village church of Altjeßnitz is now part of the Raguhn parish in the Dessau church district in Anhalt.

==== Church division ====
Location of the Evangelical Church of Anhalt on the territorial map of the Evangelical Church in Germany

The 5 church districts are divided into 140 parishes, which are grouped into regions.

- Dessau
  - Region Dessau Innenstadt
  - Region An der Elbe
  - Region Ost
  - Region Süd
  - Region West
- Köthen
  - Region Stadt Köthen
  - Region Nord
  - Region Südwest
  - Region Südost
- Zerbst
  - Region West
  - Region Ost
- Bernburg
  - Region Bernburg
  - Region West
  - Region Nord-West
- Ballenstedt
  - Region Unterharz
  - Region Vorharz
  - Region Harz-Vorland

== Worship and liturgy ==
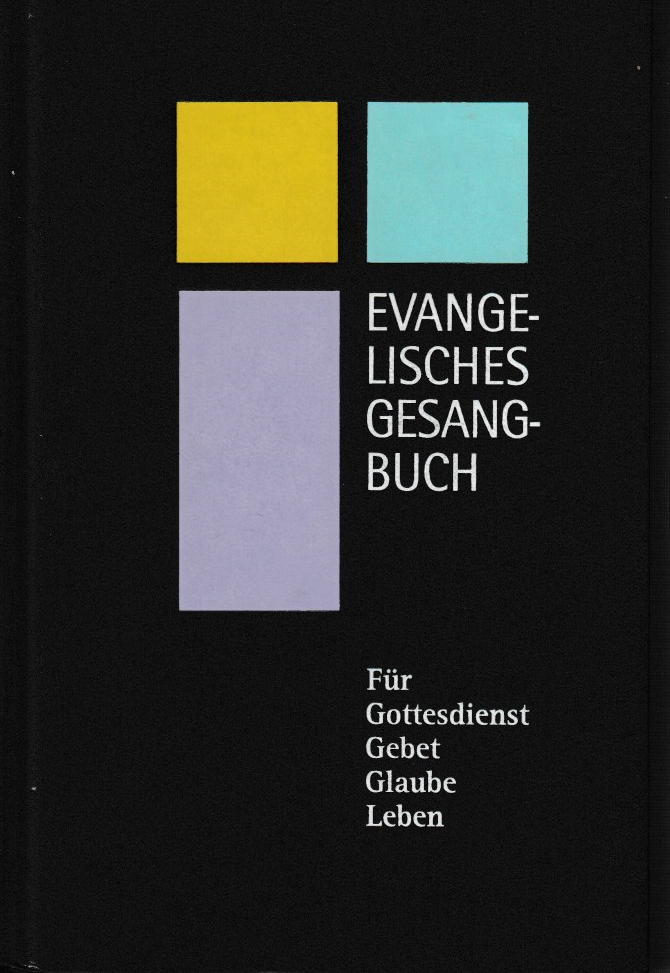
Evangelisches Gesangbuch

=== Hymn books ===
In recent decades, the congregations of the Evangelical Regional Church of Anhalt sing or have sung primarily from the following hymn books:

- Evangelisches Gesangbuch für das Herzogtum Anhalt
- Gesangbuch für die Provinz Sachsen und Anhalt
- Evangelisches Kirchengesangbuch
- Evangelisches Gesangbuch

== Practices ==
The ordination of women and blessing of same-sex unions had been allowed.

== Church newspaper ==
The weekly newspaper is published in collaboration with the Evangelical Church in Central Germany - it is entitled Faith and Homeland.

== Literature ==
- Jan Brademann: Religiöse Dynamik und Vielfalt im Kleinen. Ein Streifzug durch die Kirchen- und Religionsgeschichte Anhalts bis 1989, in: Anhaltischer Heimatbund e. V. (Hg.), 800 Jahre Anhalt. Geschichte, Kultur, Perspektiven, Dößel 2012, S. 463–480.
- Jan Brademann: Paritätische Residenzstadt und Spätkonfessionalisierung. Reformierte, Lutheraner und Pietisten im Zerbst des späten 17. und frühen 18. Jahrhunderts, in: Barbara Reul/Bert Siegmund (Hg.), Fasch und die Konfessionen (Fasch-Studien; 14), Beeskow 2018, S. 29–56.
- Jan Brademann: Evangelische Kirche im Freistaat Anhalt. Erinnerungen von Oberkirchenrat Franz Hoffmann an die Jahre 1918 bis 1923 (Quellen und Forschungen zur Geschichte Sachsen-Anhalts; 22), Halle (Saale) 2021.
- Jan Brademann (2021), Evangelische Landeskirche Anhalts (ed.), Freiheit und Bekenntnis – Die anhaltische Kirchenverfassung von 1920, Dessau-Roßlau, ISBN 978-3-9819215-4-0
