= Buchholz, Lauenburg =

Buchholz
- Municipality
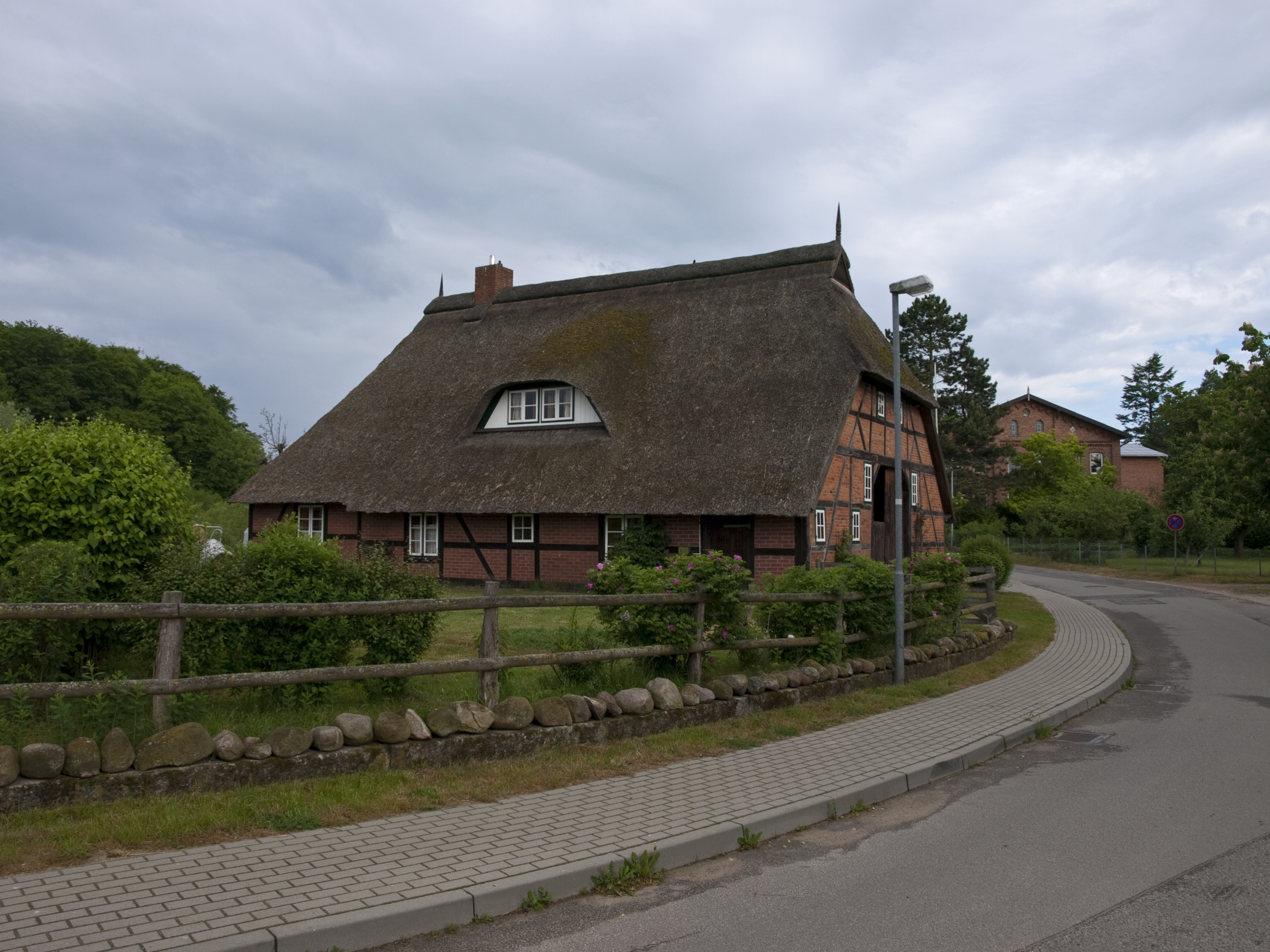

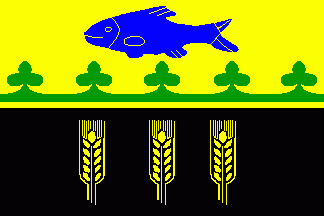
- Flag Coat of arms

- Location of Buchholz within Herzogtum Lauenburg district
- Interactive map of Buchholz
- Location within Germany Location within Schleswig-Holstein
- Coordinates: 53°43′N 10°45′E
- Country: Germany
- State: Schleswig-Holstein
- District: Herzogtum Lauenburg
- Municipal assoc.: Lauenburgische Seen

Government
  - Mayor: Wolfgang Pagel

Area
  - Total: 2.93 km^{2} (1.13 sq mi)
- Elevation: 23 m (75 ft)

Population (2025-12-31)
  - Total: 237
  - Density: 80.9/km^{2} (209/sq mi)
- Time zone: UTC+01:00 (CET)
  - Summer (DST): UTC+02:00 (CEST)
- Postal codes: 23911
- Dialling codes: 04541
- Vehicle registration: RZ
- Website: www.amt- lauenburgische- seen.de

Buchholz (German pronunciation: [ˈbuːxhɔlts]) is a municipality in the district of Lauenburg, in Schleswig-Holstein, Germany.
