= Lauenburgische Seen (Amt) =

- Amt
- Coat of arms

- Map of Lauenburg highlighting Lauenburgische Seen
- Interactive map of Lauenburgische Seen
- Location within Germany Location within Schleswig-Holstein
- Coordinates: 53°42′N 10°46′E
- Country: Germany
- State: Schleswig-Holstein
- District: Lauenburg
- Seat: Ratzeburg
- Subdivisions: 25 municipalities

Government
  - Mayor: Heinz Dohrendorff

Area
  - Total: 237.83 km^{2} (91.83 sq mi)

Population (2025-12-31)
  - Total: 14,247
  - Density: 59.904/km^{2} (155.15/sq mi)
- Time zone: UTC+01:00 (CET)
  - Summer (DST): UTC+02:00 (CEST)
- Website: amt-lauenburgische-seen.de

Lauenburgische Seen is an Amt ("collective municipality") in the district of Lauenburg, in Schleswig-Holstein, Germany. It is situated around Ratzeburg. The Amt was renamed by 1.1.2007 from Amt Ratzeburg-Land. Its seat is in the district city Ratzeburg, itself not part of the Amt.

The Amt Lauenburgische Seen consists of the following municipalities:

- Albsfelde
- Bäk
- Brunsmark
- Buchholz
- Einhaus
- Fredeburg
- Giesensdorf
- Groß Disnack
- Groß Grönau
- Groß Sarau
- Harmsdorf
- Hollenbek
- Horst
- Kittlitz
- Klein Zecher
- Kulpin
- Mechow
- Mustin
- Pogeez
- Römnitz
- Salem
- Schmilau
- Seedorf
- Sterley
- Ziethen
