= Salem, Schleswig-Holstein =

Salem
- Municipality
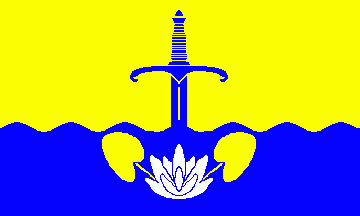
- Flag Coat of arms

- Location of Salem within Herzogtum Lauenburg district
- Interactive map of Salem
- Location within Germany Location within Schleswig-Holstein
- Coordinates: 53°40′N 10°49′E
- Country: Germany
- State: Schleswig-Holstein
- District: Herzogtum Lauenburg
- Municipal assoc.: Lauenburgische Seen

Government
  - Mayor: Herbert Schmidt

Area
  - Total: 25.1 km^{2} (9.7 sq mi)
- Elevation: 38 m (125 ft)

Population (2025-12-31)
  - Total: 713
  - Density: 28.4/km^{2} (73.6/sq mi)
- Time zone: UTC+01:00 (CET)
  - Summer (DST): UTC+02:00 (CEST)
- Postal codes: 23911
- Dialling codes: 04541, 04545
- Vehicle registration: RZ
- Website: www.amt- lauenburgische- seen.de

Salem (German pronunciation: [ˈzaːləm]) is a municipality in the district of Lauenburg, in Schleswig-Holstein, Germany.
