= Fredeburg =

- Municipality
- Location of Fredeburg within Herzogtum Lauenburg district
- Interactive map of Fredeburg
- Location within Germany Location within Schleswig-Holstein
- Coordinates: 53°40′N 10°43′E
- Country: Germany
- State: Schleswig-Holstein
- District: Herzogtum Lauenburg
- Municipal assoc.: Lauenburgische Seen

Government
  - Mayor: Lothar de Vries

Area
  - Total: 10.09 km^{2} (3.90 sq mi)
- Elevation: 33 m (108 ft)

Population (2025-12-31)
  - Total: 44
  - Density: 4.4/km^{2} (11/sq mi)
- Time zone: UTC+01:00 (CET)
  - Summer (DST): UTC+02:00 (CEST)
- Postal codes: 23909
- Dialling codes: 04541
- Vehicle registration: RZ
- Website: www.amt-lauenburgische-seen.de

Fredeburg (German pronunciation: [ˈfʁeːdəbʊʁk]) is a municipality in the district of Lauenburg, in Schleswig-Holstein, Germany.
