= Mustin, Schleswig-Holstein =

Mustin
- Municipality
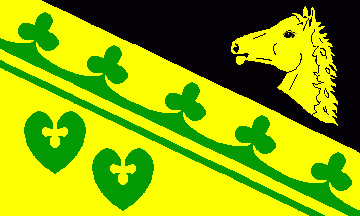
- Flag Coat of arms

- Location of Mustin within Herzogtum Lauenburg district
- Interactive map of Mustin
- Location within Germany Location within Schleswig-Holstein
- Coordinates: 53°41′N 10°53′E
- Country: Germany
- State: Schleswig-Holstein
- District: Herzogtum Lauenburg
- Municipal assoc.: Lauenburgische Seen

Government
  - Mayor: Hartwig Berg

Area
  - Total: 11.88 km^{2} (4.59 sq mi)
- Elevation: 46 m (151 ft)

Population (2025-12-31)
  - Total: 719
  - Density: 60.5/km^{2} (157/sq mi)
- Time zone: UTC+01:00 (CET)
  - Summer (DST): UTC+02:00 (CEST)
- Postal codes: 23911
- Dialling codes: 04546
- Vehicle registration: RZ
- Website: www.amt- lauenburgische- seen.de

Mustin is a municipality in the district of Lauenburg, in Schleswig-Holstein, Germany.
