= Hollenbek =

- Municipality
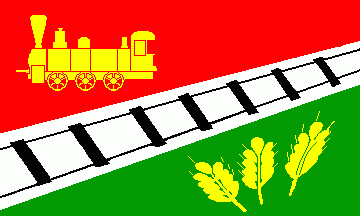
- Flag Coat of arms

- Location of Hollenbek within Herzogtum Lauenburg district
- Interactive map of Hollenbek
- Location within Germany Location within Schleswig-Holstein
- Coordinates: 53°35′N 10°49′E
- Country: Germany
- State: Schleswig-Holstein
- District: Herzogtum Lauenburg
- Municipal assoc.: Lauenburgische Seen

Government
  - Mayor: Detlef Hagemann

Area
  - Total: 7.21 km^{2} (2.78 sq mi)
- Elevation: 41 m (135 ft)

Population (2025-12-31)
  - Total: 474
  - Density: 65.7/km^{2} (170/sq mi)
- Time zone: UTC+01:00 (CET)
  - Summer (DST): UTC+02:00 (CEST)
- Postal codes: 23883
- Dialling codes: 04545
- Vehicle registration: RZ
- Website: www.amt-lauenburgische-seen.de

Hollenbek (German pronunciation: [ˈhɔlənbeːk]) is a municipality in the district of Lauenburg, in Schleswig-Holstein, Germany.
