= Sterley =

- Municipality
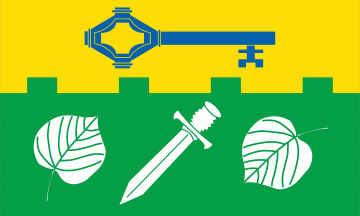
- Flag Coat of arms

- Location of Sterley within Herzogtum Lauenburg district
- Interactive map of Sterley
- Location within Germany Location within Schleswig-Holstein
- Coordinates: 53°37′17″N 10°49′5″E
- Country: Germany
- State: Schleswig-Holstein
- District: Herzogtum Lauenburg
- Municipal assoc.: Lauenburgische Seen

Government
  - Mayor: Robert Ollmann

Area
  - Total: 21.39 km^{2} (8.26 sq mi)
- Elevation: 46 m (151 ft)

Population (2025-12-31)
  - Total: 931
  - Density: 43.5/km^{2} (113/sq mi)
- Time zone: UTC+01:00 (CET)
  - Summer (DST): UTC+02:00 (CEST)
- Postal codes: 23883
- Dialling codes: 04545
- Vehicle registration: RZ
- Website: www.amt-lauenburgische-seen.de

Sterley is a municipality in the district of Lauenburg, in Schleswig-Holstein, Germany.

== See also ==
- Gudow-Sterley
