= Groß Disnack =

- Municipality
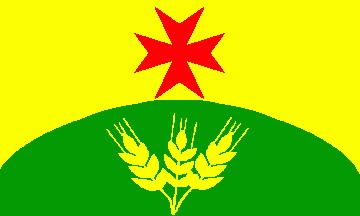
- Flag Coat of arms

- Location of Groß Disnack within Herzogtum Lauenburg district
- Interactive map of Groß Disnack
- Location within Germany Location within Schleswig-Holstein
- Coordinates: 53°45′32″N 10°41′31″E
- Country: Germany
- State: Schleswig-Holstein
- District: Herzogtum Lauenburg
- Municipal assoc.: Lauenburgische Seen

Government
  - Mayor: Torsten Gräper

Area
  - Total: 5.99 km^{2} (2.31 sq mi)
- Elevation: 45 m (148 ft)

Population (2025-12-31)
  - Total: 87
  - Density: 15/km^{2} (38/sq mi)
- Time zone: UTC+01:00 (CET)
  - Summer (DST): UTC+02:00 (CEST)
- Postal codes: 23911
- Dialling codes: 04544
- Vehicle registration: RZ
- Website: www.amt- lauenburgische- seen.de

Groß Disnack is a municipality in the district of Lauenburg, in Schleswig-Holstein, Germany. It is located south of the city of Lübeck and west of Ratzeburger See.

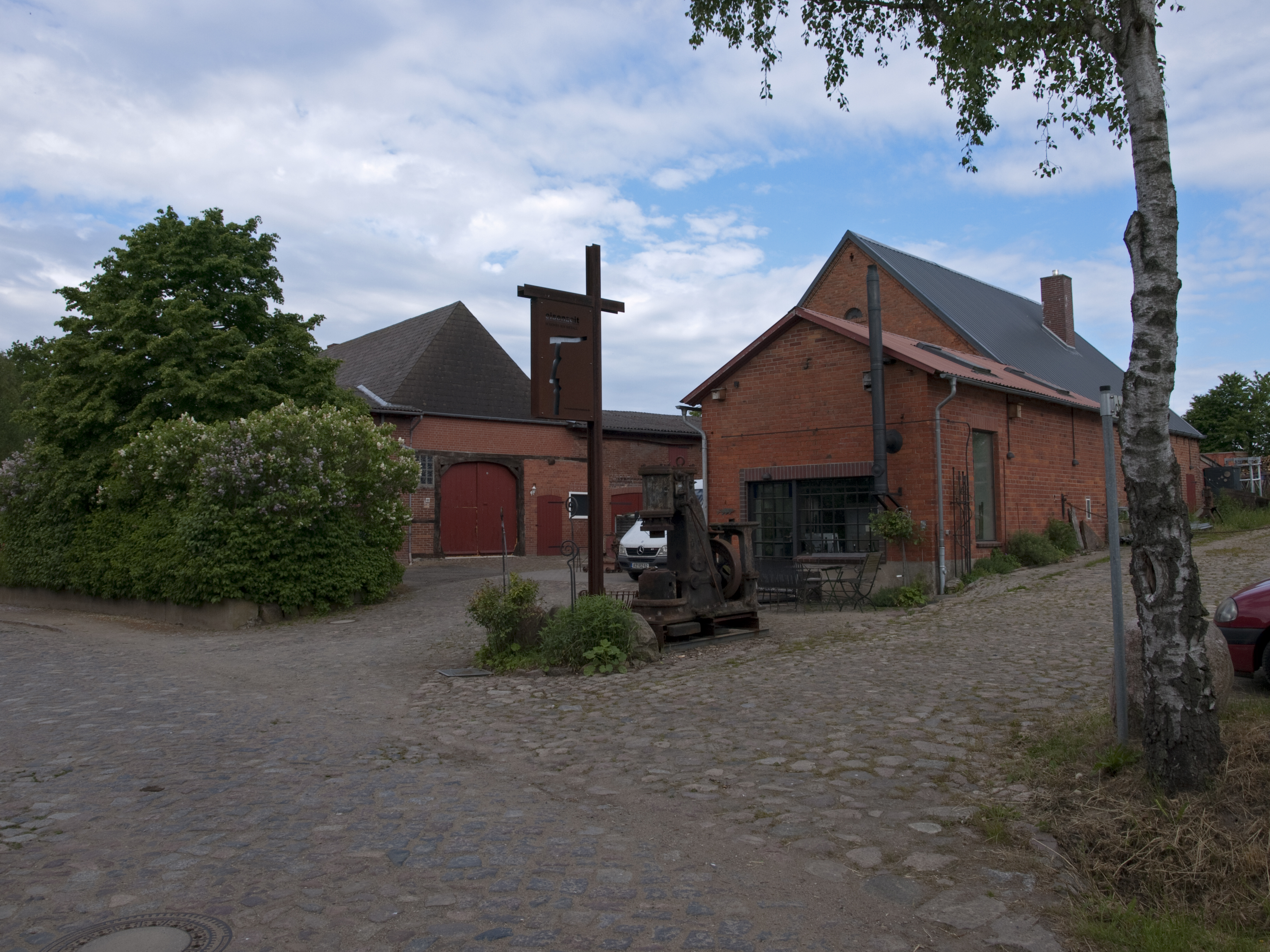
Blacksmith shop Schmeedbart.
