= Brunsmark =

- Municipality
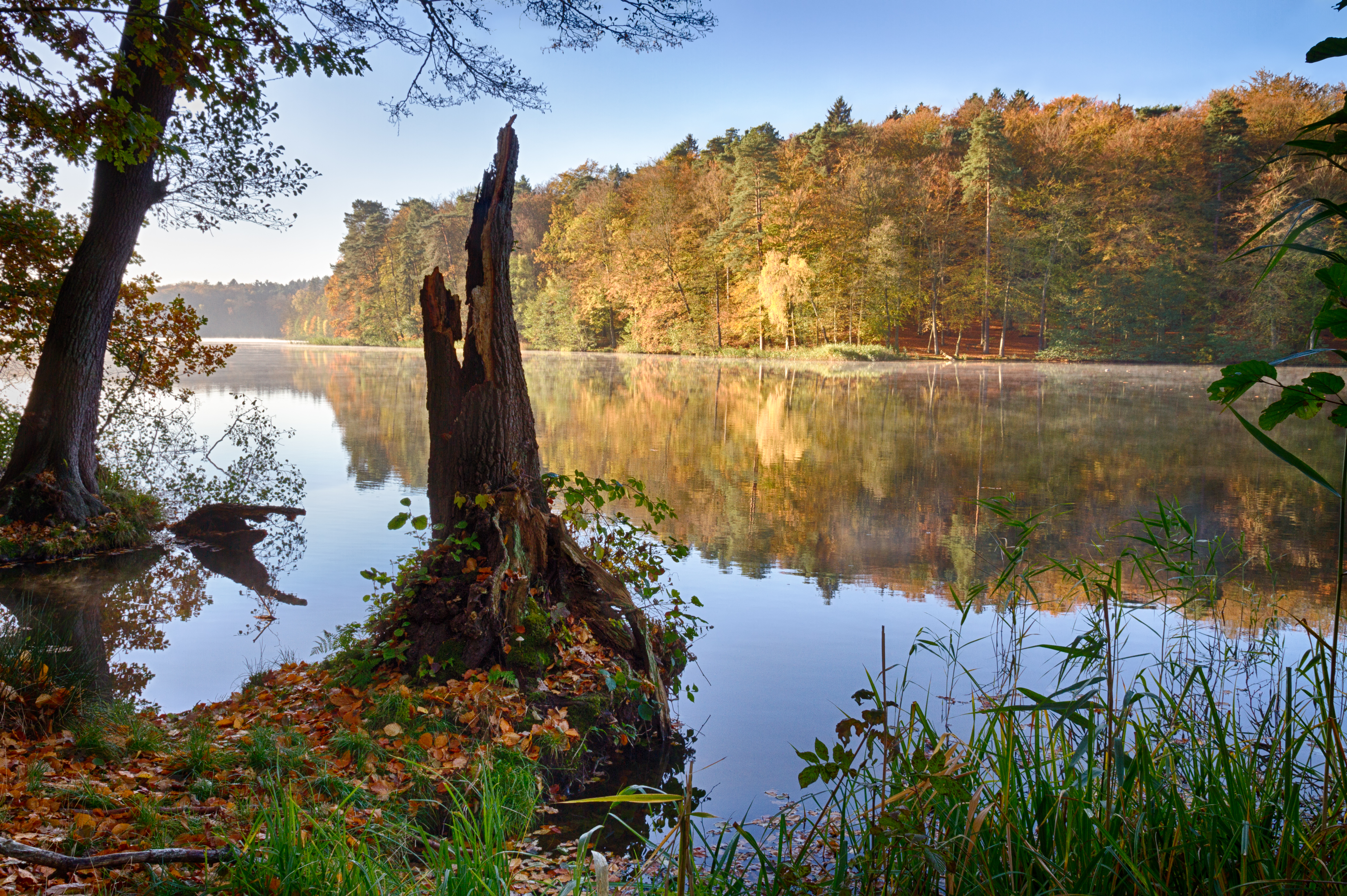
- Lütauer See in Brunsmark

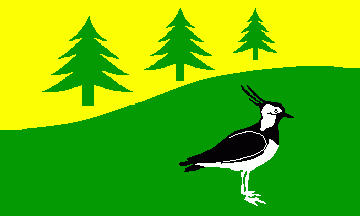
- Flag Coat of arms

- Location of Brunsmark within Herzogtum Lauenburg district
- Interactive map of Brunsmark
- Location within Germany Location within Schleswig-Holstein
- Coordinates: 53°37′8″N 10°45′0″E
- Country: Germany
- State: Schleswig-Holstein
- District: Herzogtum Lauenburg
- Municipal assoc.: Lauenburgische Seen

Government
  - Mayor: Holger Heitmann

Area
  - Total: 4.29 km^{2} (1.66 sq mi)
- Elevation: 31 m (102 ft)

Population (2025-12-31)
  - Total: 154
  - Density: 35.9/km^{2} (93.0/sq mi)
- Time zone: UTC+01:00 (CET)
  - Summer (DST): UTC+02:00 (CEST)
- Postal codes: 23883
- Dialling codes: 04542
- Vehicle registration: RZ
- Website: www.amt-lauenburgische-seen.de

Brunsmark is a municipality in the district of Herzogtum Lauenburg, in Schleswig-Holstein, Germany.

== History ==
The village was first mentioned in the Ratzeburg tithe register of 1230. From 1948 to 1970, the municipality belonged to the office of Gudow, which merged with the office of Sterley in 1971 to form the office of Gudow-Sterley. This office was dissolved on December 31, 2006. Since then, the municipality has been administered by the Lauenburg Lakes Office.

== Politics ==
Since the 2008 local election, the municipal council's seven seats have been divided between the two voter communities: ABFW holds four seats, and ABB holds three seats.

=== Mayor ===
Since 2008, non-partisan Iain Macnab served as the honorary mayor of Brunsmark. Due to his exclusive British citizenship, he automatically resigned from his position at midnight on January 31, 2020, due to Brexit. His successor, Holger Heitmann, also non-partisan, took office on March 12, 2020.

=== Flag and coat of arms ===
The flag and coat of arms of Brunsmark feature a northern lapwing and an array of three oak trees. The blazon of the coat of arms is: "Divided by gold and green in the rounded oblique section at an oblique left. Above three green fir trees, getting smaller from right to left, below a naturally tinged left-turned lapwing."
