= Albsfelde =

- Municipality
- Location of Albsfelde within Herzogtum Lauenburg district
- Interactive map of Albsfelde
- Location within Germany Location within Schleswig-Holstein
- Coordinates: 53°40′55″N 10°41′43″E
- Country: Germany
- State: Schleswig-Holstein
- District: Herzogtum Lauenburg
- Municipal assoc.: Lauenburgische Seen

Government
  - Mayor: Karl-Heinz Groschke

Area
  - Total: 4.18 km^{2} (1.61 sq mi)
- Elevation: 48 m (157 ft)

Population (2025-12-31)
  - Total: 76
  - Density: 18/km^{2} (47/sq mi)
- Time zone: UTC+01:00 (CET)
  - Summer (DST): UTC+02:00 (CEST)
- Postal codes: 23909
- Dialling codes: 04541
- Vehicle registration: RZ
- Website: www.amt-lauenburgische-seen.de

Albsfelde is a municipality in the district of Lauenburg, in Schleswig-Holstein, Germany.

== History ==
During the ages of the Vikings, trade with the village of Niendorf bei Berkenthin flourished. The reason behind is, is the Stecknitz river also known as the "Boassee". Between 1939 and 1945 there was a short break, due to unknown reason trade was not allowed in this time of existence.
