= Groß Grönau =

- Municipality
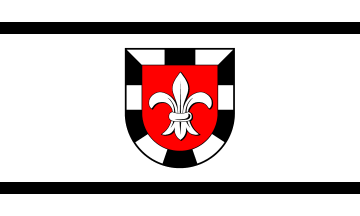
- Flag Coat of arms

- Location of Groß Grönau within Herzogtum Lauenburg district
- Interactive map of Groß Grönau
- Location within Germany Location within Schleswig-Holstein
- Coordinates: 53°48′01″N 10°45′14″E
- Country: Germany
- State: Schleswig-Holstein
- District: Herzogtum Lauenburg
- Municipal assoc.: Lauenburgische Seen

Government
  - Mayor: Hans Georg Weißkichel (CDU)

Area
  - Total: 4.9 km^{2} (1.9 sq mi)
- Elevation: 7 m (23 ft)

Population (2025-12-31)
  - Total: 3,761
  - Density: 770/km^{2} (2,000/sq mi)
- Time zone: UTC+01:00 (CET)
  - Summer (DST): UTC+02:00 (CEST)
- Postal codes: 23627
- Dialling codes: 04509
- Vehicle registration: RZ
- Website: www.amt- lauenburgische- seen.de

Groß Grönau is a municipality in the district of Lauenburg, in Schleswig-Holstein, Germany.
