= 46th Infantry Brigade (United Kingdom) =

46th Brigade 46th Infantry Brigade
- Active: 1914–1919; 1939–1946
- Country: United Kingdom
- Branch: British Army
- Type: Infantry
- Size: Brigade
- Engagements: First World War; Second World War

Commanders
- Notable commanders: Victor Fortune; Colin Muir Barber

The 46th Infantry Brigade was an infantry brigade of the British Army that saw active service in both the First and the Second World Wars with the 15th (Scottish) Infantry Division.

== First World War ==
The brigade was raised, as 46th Brigade, in 1914 as part of Kitchener's New Armies shortly after the outbreak of the First World War. With the 15th (Scottish) Division, the brigade saw active service on the Western Front in Belgium and France.

=== Order of battle ===
The brigade command the following units:

- 7th (Service) Battalion, King's Own Scottish Borderers (until May 1916) (Note: In May 1916 the 7th and 8th Battalions of the King's Own Scottish Borderers merged to form the 7th/8th Battalion.)
- 8th (Service) Battalion, King's Own Scottish Borderers (until May 1916)
- 10th (Service) Battalion, Cameronians (Scottish Rifles)
- 12th (Service) Battalion, Highland Light Infantry (left February 1918)
- 1/4th Battalion, Suffolk Regiment (from November 1915 until February 1916)
- 1/4th (Ross Highland) Battalion, Seaforth Highlanders (Ross-shire Buffs, The Duke of Albany's) (from November 1915 until January 1916)
- 7th/8th (Service) Battalion, King's Own Scottish Borderers (from May 1916)
- 46th Machine Gun Company, Machine Gun Corps (formed 11 February 1916, moved to 15th Battalion, Machine Gun Corps 17 March 1918)
- 10th/11th (Service) Battalion, Highland Light Infantry (from May 1916 until February 1918)
- 46th Trench Mortar Battery (formed May 1916)
- 9th (Service) Battalion, Black Watch (Royal Highlanders) (from February 1918 until May 1918)
- 4th/5th Battalion, Black Watch (Royal Highlanders)
- 1/9th (Highlanders) Battalion, Royal Scots (Lothian Regiment) (from June 1918)

== Second World War ==
The brigade number was reformed just before the Second World War, in late August 1939, as the 46th Infantry Brigade. The brigade was raised as a 2nd Line Territorial Army (TA) formation and was part of the 15th (Scottish) Infantry Division, which was the duplicate of the 52nd (Lowland) Infantry Division. The brigade itself was formed as a 2nd Line duplicate of the 157th Infantry Brigade, being composed of the 2nd Battalion, Glasgow Highlanders and the 10th and 11th Battalions of the Highland Light Infantry (HLI). As the war progressed, however, the two HLI battalions were posted elsewhere and replaced by Scottish units from other formations.

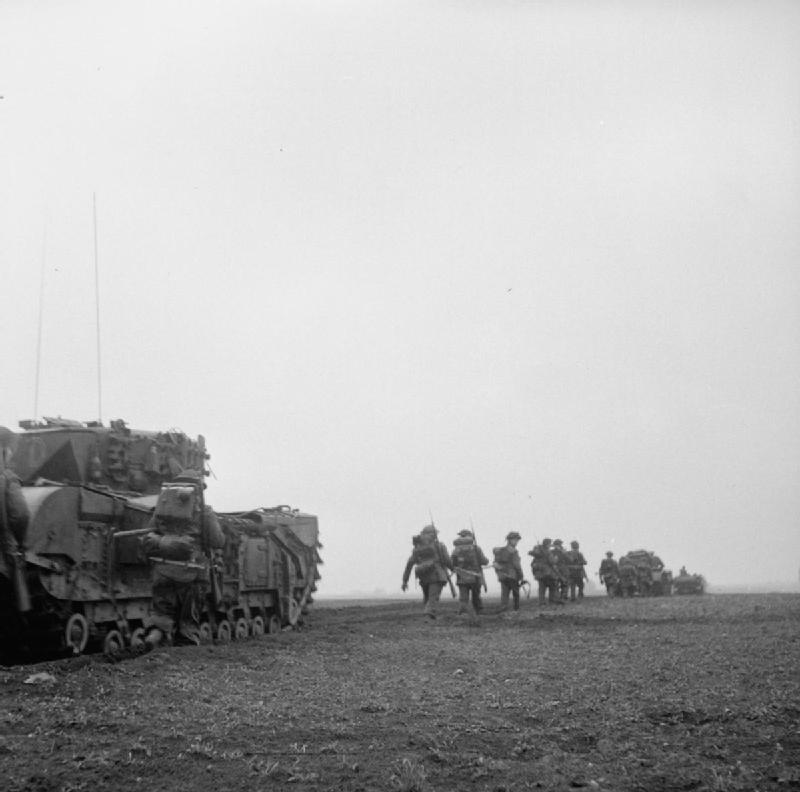
Churchill tanks of the 4th (Armoured) Battalion, Coldstream Guards, 6th Guards Tank Brigade, and infantrymen of the 2nd Battalion, Glasgow Highlanders during the advance to the Siegfried Line, 8 February 1945.

It remained in the United Kingdom training for most of the war, crossing the channel to Normandy, France on 13 June 1944. The brigade went on to serve in the Battle of Normandy in Operation Epsom, later the Second Battle of the Odon, Operation Bluecoat, the Allied advance from Paris to the Rhine, followed by Operation Veritable and the assault crossing of the Rhine, Operation Plunder.

=== Order of battle ===
The 46th Infantry Brigade was constituted as follows during the war:

- 10th Battalion, Highland Light Infantry (until 1 November 1941)
- 11th Battalion, Highland Light Infantry (until 19 November 1941)
- 2nd Battalion, Glasgow Highlanders
- 7th Battalion, Seaforth Highlanders (from 15 November 1941)
- 7th Battalion, Queen's Own Cameron Highlanders (from 18 November 1941 until 23 March 1942, later became 5th (Scottish) Parachute Battalion)
- 4th Battalion, Queen's Own Cameron Highlanders (from 24 March 1942 until 16 November 1942)
- 10th Battalion, Black Watch (Royal Highland Regiment) (from 19 November 1942 until 27 December 1942)
- 9th Battalion, Cameronians (Scottish Rifles) (from 28 December 1942)
