= Schmilau =

- Municipality
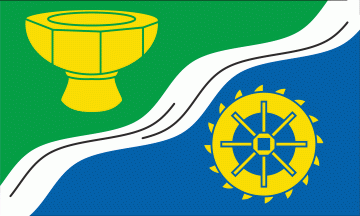
- Flag Coat of arms

- Location of Schmilau within Herzogtum Lauenburg district
- Interactive map of Schmilau
- Location within Germany Location within Schleswig-Holstein
- Coordinates: 53°39′43″N 10°45′17″E
- Country: Germany
- State: Schleswig-Holstein
- District: Herzogtum Lauenburg
- Municipal assoc.: Lauenburgische Seen

Government
  - Mayor: Eckhard Rollinger

Area
  - Total: 11.55 km^{2} (4.46 sq mi)
- Elevation: 29 m (95 ft)

Population (2025-12-31)
  - Total: 579
  - Density: 50.1/km^{2} (130/sq mi)
- Time zone: UTC+01:00 (CET)
  - Summer (DST): UTC+02:00 (CEST)
- Postal codes: 23911
- Dialling codes: 04541
- Vehicle registration: RZ
- Website: www.amt-lauenburgische-seen.de

Schmilau is a municipality in the district of Lauenburg, in Schleswig-Holstein, Germany.
