= Pogeez =

- Municipality
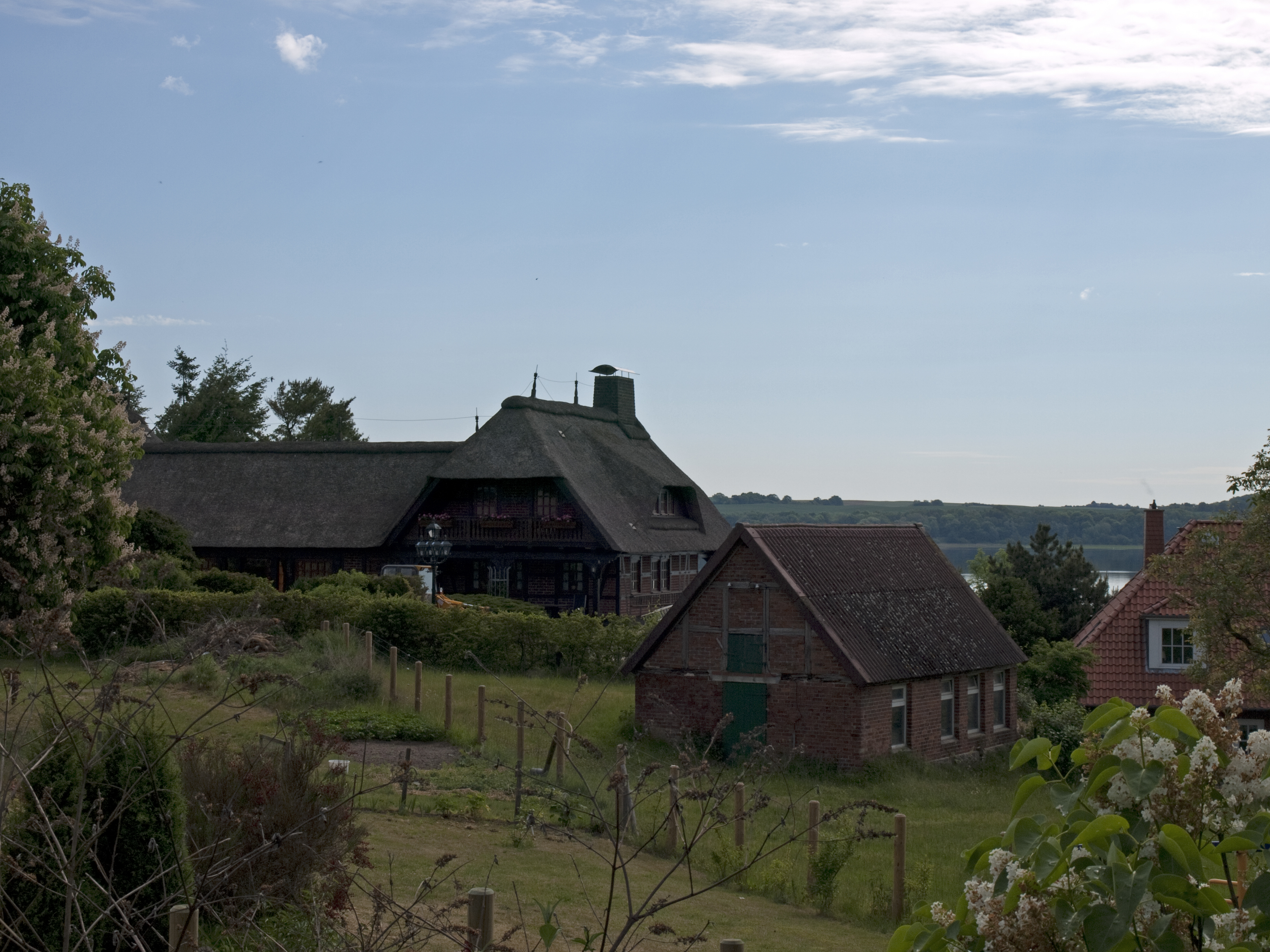
- Ratzeburger See in Pogeez

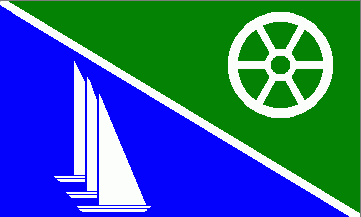
- Flag Coat of arms

- Location of Pogeez within Herzogtum Lauenburg district
- Interactive map of Pogeez
- Location within Germany Location within Schleswig-Holstein
- Coordinates: 53°45′06″N 10°43′51″E
- Country: Germany
- State: Schleswig-Holstein
- District: Herzogtum Lauenburg
- Municipal assoc.: Lauenburgische Seen

Government
  - Mayor: Jan-Peter Dohrendorf

Area
  - Total: 4.51 km^{2} (1.74 sq mi)
- Elevation: 14 m (46 ft)

Population (2025-12-31)
  - Total: 525
  - Density: 116/km^{2} (301/sq mi)
- Time zone: UTC+01:00 (CET)
  - Summer (DST): UTC+02:00 (CEST)
- Postal codes: 23911
- Dialling codes: 04541
- Vehicle registration: RZ
- Website: www.amt-lauenburgische-seen.de

Pogeez is a municipality in the district of Lauenburg, in Schleswig-Holstein, Germany. It is located south of the city of Lübeck, on the western bank of Ratzeburger See.
