= Giesensdorf =

- Municipality
- Location of Giesensdorf within Herzogtum Lauenburg district
- Interactive map of Giesensdorf
- Location within Germany Location within Schleswig-Holstein
- Coordinates: 53°40′48″N 10°41′40″E
- Country: Germany
- State: Schleswig-Holstein
- District: Herzogtum Lauenburg
- Municipal assoc.: Lauenburgische Seen

Government
  - Mayor: Hans-Michael Hansberg

Area
  - Total: 2.73 km^{2} (1.05 sq mi)
- Elevation: 34 m (112 ft)

Population (2025-12-31)
  - Total: 166
  - Density: 60.8/km^{2} (157/sq mi)
- Time zone: UTC+01:00 (CET)
  - Summer (DST): UTC+02:00 (CEST)
- Postal codes: 23909
- Dialling codes: 04541
- Vehicle registration: RZ
- Website: www.amt-lauenburgische-seen.de

Giesensdorf is a municipality in the district of Lauenburg, in Schleswig-Holstein, Germany.
