= Einhaus =

- Municipality
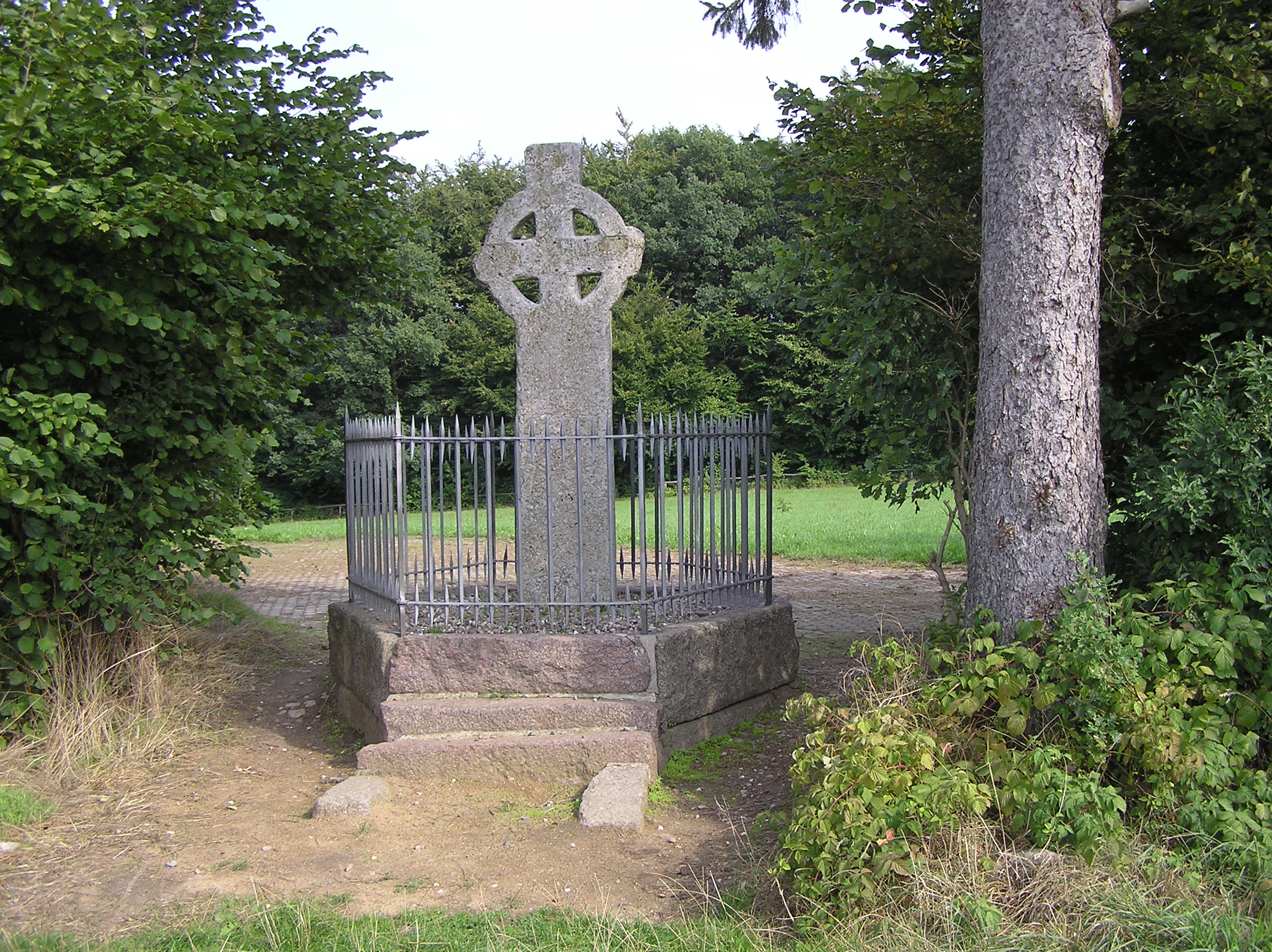
- Cross of Ansverus in Einhaus

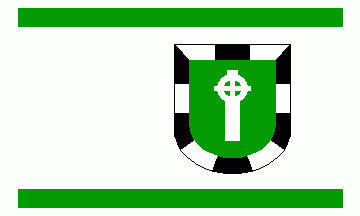
- Flag Coat of arms

- Location of Einhaus within Herzogtum Lauenburg district
- Interactive map of Einhaus
- Location within Germany Location within Schleswig-Holstein
- Coordinates: 53°43′N 10°44′E
- Country: Germany
- State: Schleswig-Holstein
- District: Herzogtum Lauenburg
- Municipal assoc.: Lauenburgische Seen

Government
  - Mayor: Joachim Meinke

Area
  - Total: 2.53 km^{2} (0.98 sq mi)
- Elevation: 3 m (9.8 ft)

Population (2025-12-31)
  - Total: 429
  - Density: 170/km^{2} (439/sq mi)
- Time zone: UTC+01:00 (CET)
  - Summer (DST): UTC+02:00 (CEST)
- Postal codes: 23911
- Dialling codes: 04541
- Vehicle registration: RZ
- Website: www.amt- lauenburgische- seen.de

Einhaus (German pronunciation: [ˈaɪnhaʊs]) is a municipality in the district of Lauenburg, in Schleswig-Holstein, Germany.
