= Klein Zecher =

- Municipality
- Location of Klein Zecher within Herzogtum Lauenburg district
- Interactive map of Klein Zecher
- Location within Germany Location within Schleswig-Holstein
- Coordinates: 53°35′N 10°52′E
- Country: Germany
- State: Schleswig-Holstein
- District: Herzogtum Lauenburg
- Municipal assoc.: Lauenburgische Seen

Government
  - Mayor: Conrad Torkler

Area
  - Total: 9.11 km^{2} (3.52 sq mi)
- Elevation: 43 m (141 ft)

Population (2025-12-31)
  - Total: 235
  - Density: 25.8/km^{2} (66.8/sq mi)
- Time zone: UTC+01:00 (CET)
  - Summer (DST): UTC+02:00 (CEST)
- Postal codes: 23883
- Dialling codes: 04545
- Vehicle registration: RZ
- Website: www.amt-lauenburgische-seen.de

Klein Zecher is a municipality in the district of Lauenburg, in Schleswig-Holstein, Germany.
