= Linda Zecher =

American executive (born 1953)

Linda Zecher Higgins
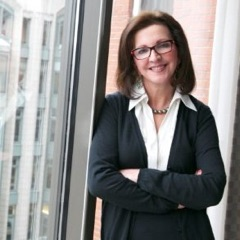
- Education: Ohio State University
- Years active: 1980–present
- Board member of: Hasbro, John F Kennedy Foundation

Linda Zecher Higgins (born May 4, 1953) is an American executive who is currently a partner with Cyber Knowledge Partners. She most recently served as the president, CEO and Chairman of IronNet corporation, a leader in Cyber Security, and previously President, CEO and member of the Board of Houghton Mifflin Harcourt, a global education and learning company. In the past she had worked as the corporate vice president of the Microsoft Worldwide Public Sector business unit until September 2011. Additionally, she had served as the president and CEO of Evolve Corporation, as the senior vice president of Oracle, as a very early vice president of PeopleSoft, and in several senior positions in Bank of America. She began her career as a geophysicist with Texas Instruments.

== Early life and education ==
Zecher was born in Middletown, Ohio, as one of two children. Her mother was a homemaker and her father was self-made.

From 1971, Zecher studied earth science at Ohio State University, Columbus, Ohio, graduating with a bachelor's degree in 1975. During her college years she had a non-typical job working at the county jail.

== Career ==
=== Early leadership positions ===
Following field experience as a geophysicist with Texas Instruments in Midland, Texas she joined Bank of America as the vice president of the Business Services division. During her tenure she moved the Services division from a mainframe HR and Payroll Service Bureau to PC based applications that were marketed to the bank's Service Bureau customers.

While at BofA she became introduced to a young software company focused on people management. She saw enough value in the software that she joined the company, PeopleSoft, as its 9th employee.

Following PeopleSoft, Zecher joined Oracle as senior vice president in 1977 with responsibility for building Oracle's Application business in Public Sector, Higher Education, Healthcare, Telecommunications, Financial Services and the Utilities markets. She tendered her resignation in March 2002 to become CEO of Evolve Corporation.

Evolve Corporation, an enterprise professional services automation software company, was a publicly traded company controlled by Private Equity firms. The company had gone through difficult times following the dot com boom. During a one-year time frame, she stabilized the company, sold the assets and took the liabilities through a bankruptcy to help the Private Equity owners recover a portion of their investment.

=== Microsoft ===
Zecher joined Microsoft in 2003 to lead the US Public Sector organization which focused on government, education and health customers. Within 3 years, she grew the revenue from just under $1B to $2B. The catalyst for growth was an extensive reorganization resulting in 40% more customer-facing employees. Accompanying the realignment was a focus on accountability and customer satisfaction.

Her success in the US Public Sector led to her being named corporate vice president of Microsoft's Worldwide Public Sector organization. The worldwide business unit had over 2,000 employees serving government, education and health customers in over 100 countries. Under her leadership the business experienced double digit growth each year rising to over $10B. She resigned from Microsoft in September 2011 when she was recruited to lead Houghton Mifflin Harcourt.

=== Houghton Mifflin Harcourt ===
Zecher was named president, CEO and director of Houghton Mifflin Harcourt (HMH), a global education and learning company in September 2011. With origins dating back to 1832, the company is among the world's largest providers of Pre-K–12 education solutions and one of the longest-established publishing houses. Within six months of joining HMH, Zecher led the company through a pre-pack bankruptcy resulting in a successful financial restructuring in which $3.1B of debt was eliminated and converted to equity. The company emerged 32 days later. HMH deepened their market penetration by acquiring the culinary and reference portfolio of John Wiley & Sons that included Webster's New World Dictionary and CliffsNotes.

Zecher engineered a successful IPO in 2013. Several leading news organizations have interviewed her about her success, family focus, and leadership style.

Using mobile applications for consumer markets and leveraging brand awareness of Curious George, Carmen Sandiego and The Polar Express Zecher began to move HMH to an e-business. HMH launched Curious World in 2015 as interactive education subscription software curated by early education experts and aligned to eight key learning areas.

Zecher resigned from Houghton Mifflin Harcourt in September 2016 after a wave of disappointing earnings announcements and greater than 50% decline in the stock price.

=== The Barkley Group ===
Zecher Higgins launched a boutique consulting firm, The Barkley Group, in 2017. The firm focuses on digital transformation across industries, educational consumer interests, and business strategy

== Board activity ==
Zecher Higgins has previously served on the U.S. State Department's Board for Overseas Schools, The Emily Couric Leadership Forum, James Madison University Board of Visitors, the Tandem Friends School Board, Chesapeake Bay Maritime Museum Board, Cradles to Crayons Board, The John F. Kennedy Foundation Board, and the Intelligence and National Security Association (INSA) Board.

Zecher Higgins was formerly a member of the Hasbro Corporation board, where she serves on the audit committee and chairs the Cyber Security committee, currently on The Tenable Corporation Board, where she serves on the nominating and chairs the compensation committees. A former member of the C5 Capital Board, where she was a member of the investment committee, operating partner, and chaired the audit committee. She was formerly the audit chair and board member for C5 Acquisition Corporation. Zecher Higgins holds a Bachelor of Science degree from Ohio State University and an honorary doctorate from Bentley University, where she delivered the commencement address.
