= Kittlitz, Lauenburg =

Kittlitz
- Municipality
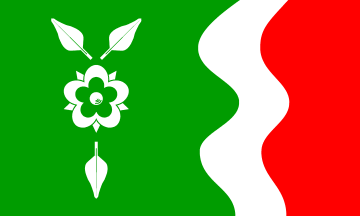
- Flag Coat of arms

- Location of Kittlitz within Herzogtum Lauenburg district
- Interactive map of Kittlitz
- Location within Germany Location within Schleswig-Holstein
- Coordinates: 53°40′N 10°55′E
- Country: Germany
- State: Schleswig-Holstein
- District: Herzogtum Lauenburg
- Municipal assoc.: Lauenburgische Seen

Government
  - Mayor: Barbara Eggert

Area
  - Total: 17.73 km^{2} (6.85 sq mi)
- Elevation: 53 m (174 ft)

Population (2025-12-31)
  - Total: 296
  - Density: 16.7/km^{2} (43.2/sq mi)
- Time zone: UTC+01:00 (CET)
  - Summer (DST): UTC+02:00 (CEST)
- Postal codes: 23911
- Dialling codes: 04546
- Vehicle registration: RZ
- Website: www.amt- lauenburgische- seen.de

Kittlitz is a municipality in the district of Lauenburg, in Schleswig-Holstein, Germany.
