= Kulpin, Germany =

Kulpin
- Municipality
- Location of Kulpin within Herzogtum Lauenburg district
- Interactive map of Kulpin
- Location within Germany Location within Schleswig-Holstein
- Coordinates: 53°42′N 10°42′E
- Country: Germany
- State: Schleswig-Holstein
- District: Herzogtum Lauenburg
- Municipal assoc.: Lauenburgische Seen

Government
  - Mayor: Heinz Dohrendorff

Area
  - Total: 6.07 km^{2} (2.34 sq mi)
- Elevation: 41 m (135 ft)

Population (2025-12-31)
  - Total: 219
  - Density: 36.1/km^{2} (93.4/sq mi)
- Time zone: UTC+01:00 (CET)
  - Summer (DST): UTC+02:00 (CEST)
- Postal codes: 23911
- Dialling codes: 04541
- Vehicle registration: RZ
- Website: www.amt-lauenburgische-seen.de

Kulpin is a municipality in the district of Lauenburg, in Schleswig-Holstein, Germany.
