= Mechow =

- Municipality
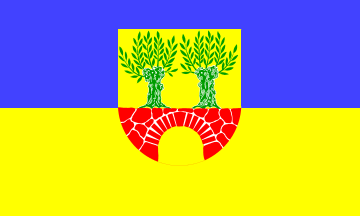
- Flag Coat of arms

- Location of Mechow within Herzogtum Lauenburg district
- Interactive map of Mechow
- Location within Germany Location within Schleswig-Holstein
- Coordinates: 53°43′N 10°48′E
- Country: Germany
- State: Schleswig-Holstein
- District: Herzogtum Lauenburg
- Municipal assoc.: Lauenburgische Seen

Government
  - Mayor: Uwe Janssen

Area
  - Total: 4.31 km^{2} (1.66 sq mi)
- Elevation: 36 m (118 ft)

Population (2025-12-31)
  - Total: 143
  - Density: 33.2/km^{2} (85.9/sq mi)
- Time zone: UTC+01:00 (CET)
  - Summer (DST): UTC+02:00 (CEST)
- Postal codes: 23909
- Dialling codes: 04541
- Vehicle registration: RZ
- Website: amt-lauenburgische-seen.de

Mechow (czech Mechov) a municipality in the district of Lauenburg, in Schleswig-Holstein, Germany.
