= Bäk =

- Municipality
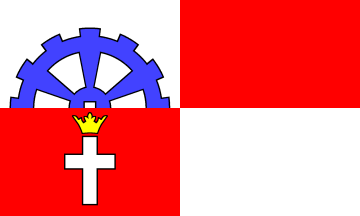
- Flag Coat of arms

- Location of Bäk within Herzogtum Lauenburg district
- Interactive map of Bäk
- Location within Germany Location within Schleswig-Holstein
- Coordinates: 53°42′41″N 10°46′57″E
- Country: Germany
- State: Schleswig-Holstein
- District: Herzogtum Lauenburg
- Municipal assoc.: Lauenburgische Seen

Government
  - Mayor: Thomas Teut (CDU)

Area
  - Total: 4.3 km^{2} (1.7 sq mi)
- Elevation: 38 m (125 ft)

Population (2025-12-31)
  - Total: 901
  - Density: 210/km^{2} (540/sq mi)
- Time zone: UTC+01:00 (CET)
  - Summer (DST): UTC+02:00 (CEST)
- Postal codes: 23909
- Dialling codes: 04541
- Vehicle registration: RZ
- Website: www.amt-lauenburgische-seen.de

Bäk (German pronunciation: [bɛːk]) is a municipality in the district of Lauenburg, in Schleswig-Holstein, Germany.
