= Römnitz =

- Municipality
- Coat of arms

- Location of Römnitz within Herzogtum Lauenburg district
- Interactive map of Römnitz
- Location within Germany Location within Schleswig-Holstein
- Coordinates: 53°43′N 10°46′E
- Country: Germany
- State: Schleswig-Holstein
- District: Herzogtum Lauenburg
- Municipal assoc.: Lauenburgische Seen

Government
  - Mayor: Karl Guse

Area
  - Total: 5.21 km^{2} (2.01 sq mi)
- Elevation: 28 m (92 ft)

Population (2025-12-31)
  - Total: 58
  - Density: 11/km^{2} (29/sq mi)
- Time zone: UTC+01:00 (CET)
  - Summer (DST): UTC+02:00 (CEST)
- Postal codes: 23909
- Dialling codes: 04541
- Vehicle registration: RZ
- Website: www.amt-lauenburgische-seen.de

Römnitz is a municipality in the district of Lauenburg, in Schleswig-Holstein, Germany.
