= Sandesneben (Amt) =

Former Amt in Schleswig-Holstein

- Former Amt
- Location of the former Amt within the district of Lauenburg

- Location within Schleswig-Holstein
- Coordinates: 53.683°N 10.500°E
- Country: Germany
- State: Schleswig-Holstein
- District: Lauenburg
- Disestablished: 1 January 2008
- Seat: Sandesneben

Population (2011 census)
  - Total: 10,441
- Municipalities: 16

Sandesneben was an Amt ("collective municipality") in the district of Lauenburg, in Schleswig-Holstein, Germany. It comprised 16 municipalities, with its seat in Sandesneben. On 1 January 2008, the Amt was merged with the neighbouring Amt Nusse to form the Amt Sandesneben-Nusse.

The Amt comprised the following 16 municipalities, with their populations at the 2011 and 2022 censuses:

Member municipalities
Municipality	2011	2022
Grinau	306	288
Groß Boden	201	213
Groß Schenkenberg	540	572
Klinkrade	589	614
Labenz	874	882
Linau	1,186	1,222
Lüchow	287	307
Sandesneben (Note: Seat of the Amt.)	1,694	1,886
Schiphorst	615	681
Schönberg	1,389	1,449
Schürensöhlen	145	158
Siebenbäumen	638	607
Sirksfelde	312	333
Steinhorst	571	564
Stubben	404	381
Wentorf	690	717
Total	10,441	10,874
