= Nusse (Amt) =

Former settlement in Schleswig-Holstein, Germany

Coordinates: 53.667°N 10.583°E

- Former amt
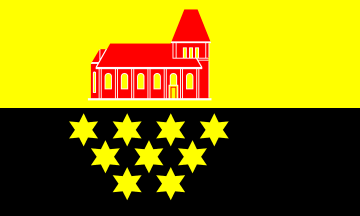
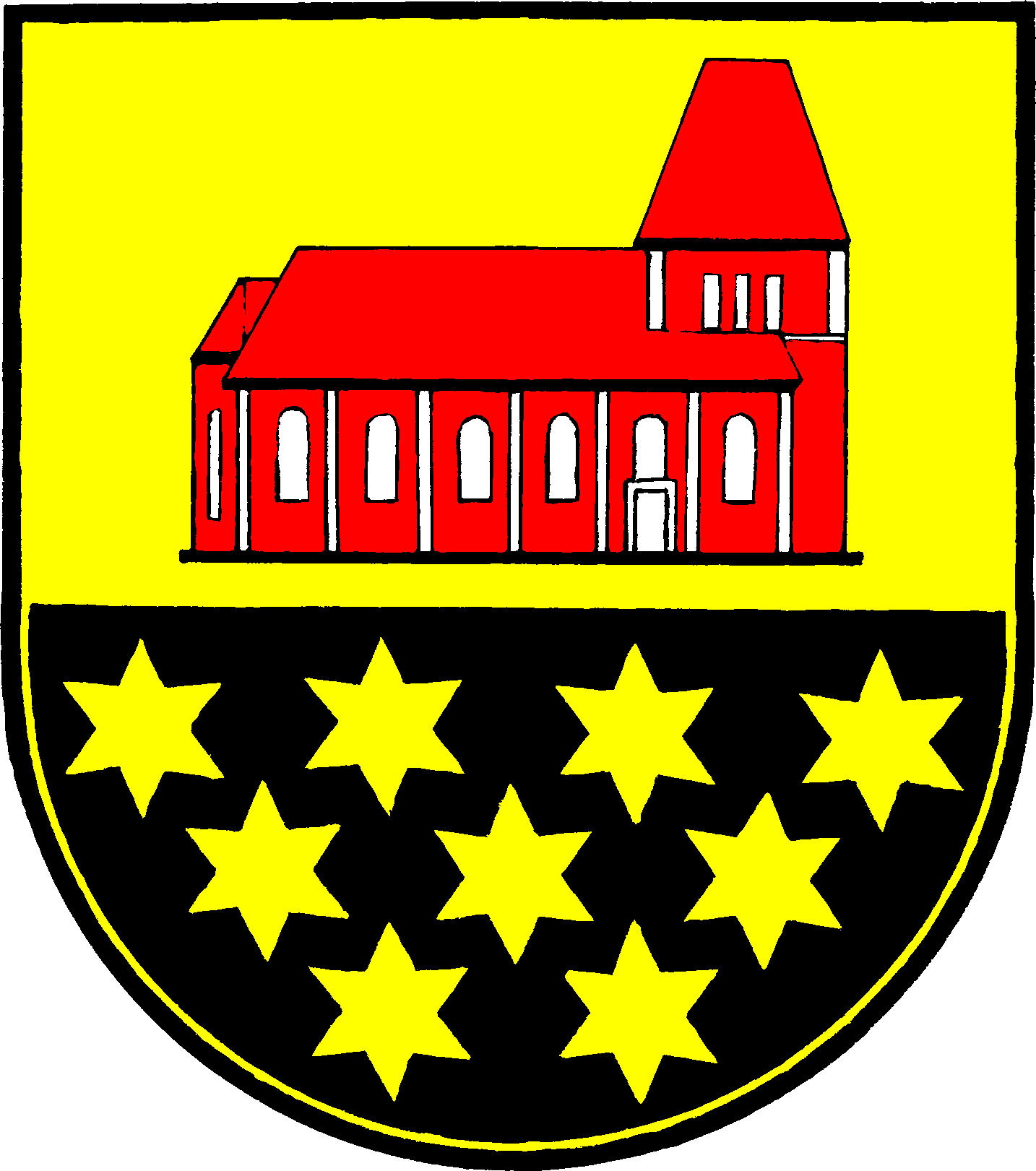
- Flag Coat of arms

- Map of Dithmarschen highlighting Nusse
- Country: Germany
- State: Schleswig-Holstein
- District: Lauenburg
- Disestablished: 1 January 2008
- Region seat: Nusse

Area
  - Total: 90 km^{2} (35 sq mi)

Nusse was an Amt ("collective municipality") in the district of Lauenburg, in Schleswig-Holstein, Germany. Its seat was in Nusse. In January 2008, it was merged with the Amt Sandesneben to form the Amt Sandesneben-Nusse.

The Amt Nusse consisted of the following municipalities (population in 2005 between brackets):

1. Duvensee (539)
2. Koberg (733)
3. Kühsen (378)
4. Lankau (491)
5. Nusse (1,027)
6. Panten (725)
7. Poggensee (337)
8. Ritzerau (287)
9. Walksfelde (188)
