= Göldenitz =

- Municipality
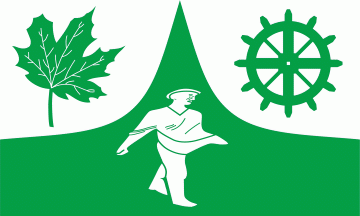
- Flag Coat of arms

- Location of Göldenitz within Herzogtum Lauenburg district
- Interactive map of Göldenitz
- Location within Germany Location within Schleswig-Holstein
- Coordinates: 53°43′N 10°37′E
- Country: Germany
- State: Schleswig-Holstein
- District: Herzogtum Lauenburg
- Municipal assoc.: Berkenthin

Government
  - Mayor: Anja Dührkopp

Area
  - Total: 5.18 km^{2} (2.00 sq mi)
- Elevation: 15 m (49 ft)

Population (2025-12-31)
  - Total: 253
  - Density: 48.8/km^{2} (126/sq mi)
- Time zone: UTC+01:00 (CET)
  - Summer (DST): UTC+02:00 (CEST)
- Postal codes: 23919
- Dialling codes: 04544
- Vehicle registration: RZ
- Website: www.amt- berkenthin.de

Göldenitz is a municipality in the district of Lauenburg, in Schleswig-Holstein, Germany.

It's located near the Elbe-Lübeckkanal and has a connection road to Berkenthin and Niendorf bei Berkenthin. The village population is counted by 240 in 2024 and is expanding.

The village itself has a firefighter station which was built in the year 2023 and people in that village are free to join the firefighter service as a volunteer.

As an example on August 24, 2023, at around 10:55 pm, a fire broke out in a 200-year-old thatched-roof house in Niendorf. Due to the threat to other buildings and the insufficient water supply from the village pond, the alert level was raised to "Fire 6" to request additional support. Emergency crews took over breathing apparatus monitoring and supported the firefighting operation as well as the water supply from a firefighting pond and the Elbe-Lübeck Canal. Drones with thermal imaging cameras were used to assess the situation from the air. After the extinguishing measures, which lasted until 5:45 a.m., the operational readiness was restored by cleaning and checking the equipment.

Every year, the village celebrates a festival for children and locals. The festival is like a big game in which the children can become the princess and king.

The nature is full of things to explore like paths or fields which are used by farmers. Göldenitz also has a stream who's named Göldenitzer Mühlenbach. The animal kingdom in Göldenitz is very diverse, from ants, deer and birds to large animals such as horses and cows.

Last but not least there's an engineer office, an electrician and a heating company located in the village.
