= Hans Häckermann =

German actor

- Born: Hans Häckermann; March 3, 1930; Pirna, Germany
- Died: September 16, 1995 (aged 65); Ritzerau, Germany
- Occupation: Actor
- Years active: 1964-1995

Hans Häckermann (March 3, 1930 in Pirna, Germany – September 16, 1995 in Ritzerau, Germany) was a German actor.

== Filmography ==
Year	Title	Role	Notes
1972	Einmal im Leben – Geschichte eines Eigenheims	Schlehmann	TV miniseries
1974	Eintausend Milliarden	Steffen	TV film
1975	Die Stadt im Tal	Bürgermeister Kammerloher	TV film
1981	Circle of Deceit	Senior Editor	
