= Jungbluth =

Jungbluth is a surname. Notable people with the surname include:

- Alexander Jungbluth (born 1957), German politician
- Carlo Jungbluth (born 1958), Luxembourgish footballer
- Klaus Jungbluth (born 1979), Ecuadorean cross-country skier
- Paul Jungbluth (born 1949), Dutch politician

== See also ==
- Jungblut
