= Alexander von Dassel =

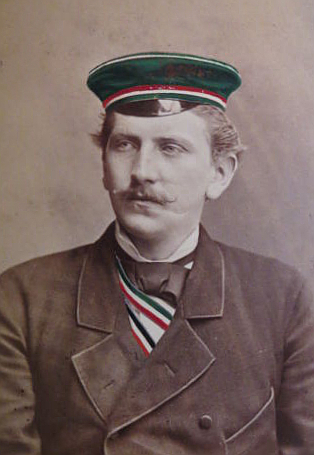
Alexander von Dassel as a corps student in the winter semester of 1879/80. Photograph: W. Höffert, Hannover

Alexander von Dassel (1 December 1854 - 28 October 1942) was a German privy councilor and magistrate (Geheimer Justizrat and Amtsgerichtsrat).

== Life and career ==
Alexander von Dassel was born in Lemförde as a son of Alexander von Dassel sen. (12 February 1817 in Lüneburg - 18 Juli 1911 Lüchow) and his wife Bertha von Dassel (9 January 1817 in Hoppensen - 13 March 1883 in Lüchow). He studied in Leipzig and Tübingen and became a corps student of Corps Misnia Leipzig and Corps Suevia Tübingen.

He married on 30 March 1894 in the age of 30 years the eight years younger Helene Busch (28 March 1862 in Bleckede - 13 January 1947 in Göttingen). He died in Göttingen.
