= Bälau =

- Municipality
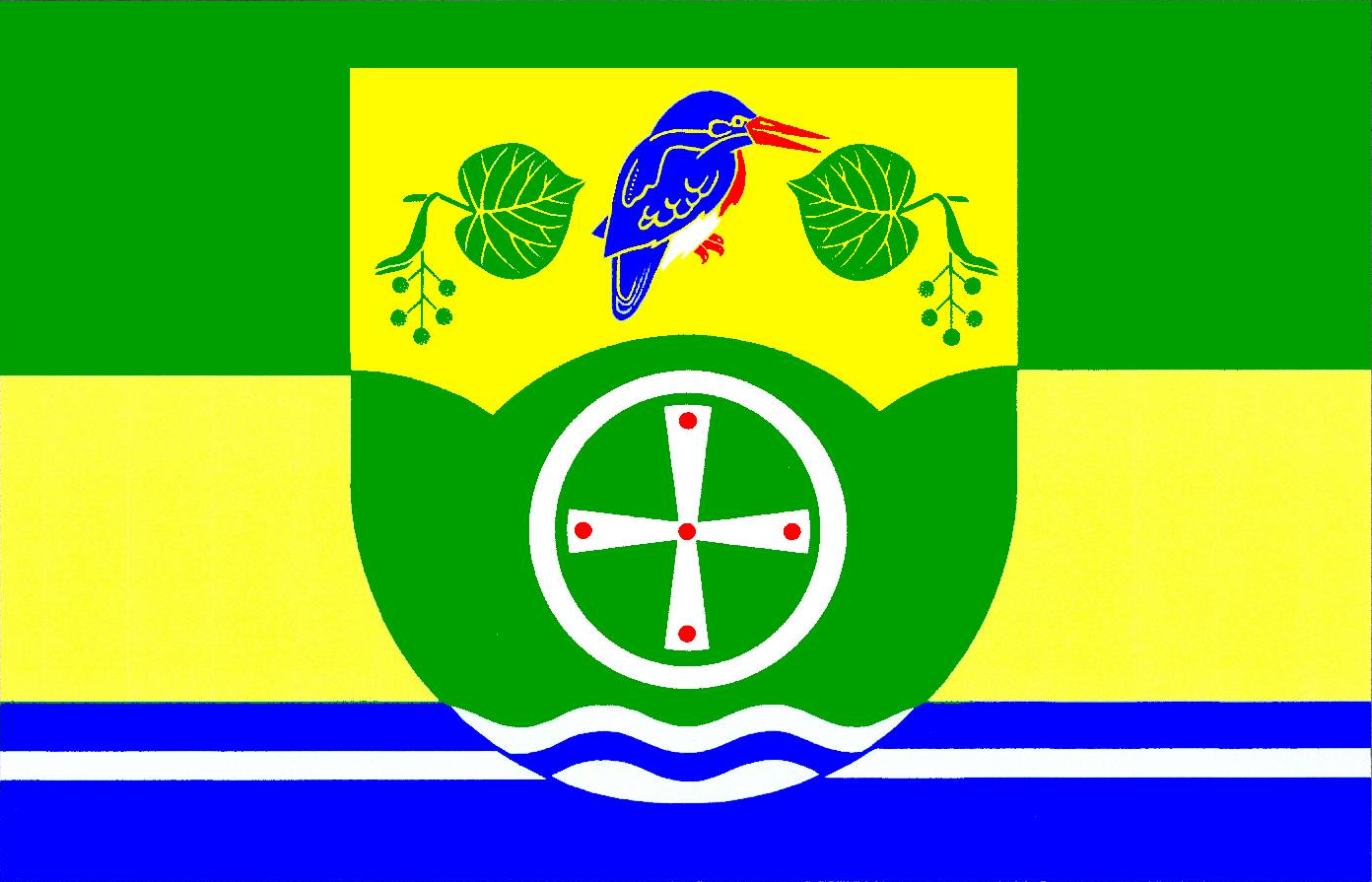
- Flag Coat of arms

- Location of Bälau within Herzogtum Lauenburg district
- Interactive map of Bälau
- Location within Germany Location within Schleswig-Holstein
- Coordinates: 53°37′N 10°37′E
- Country: Germany
- State: Schleswig-Holstein
- District: Herzogtum Lauenburg
- Municipal assoc.: Breitenfelde

Government
  - Mayor: Hans Schmaljohann

Area
  - Total: 6.5 km^{2} (2.5 sq mi)
- Elevation: 36 m (118 ft)

Population (2025-12-31)
  - Total: 235
  - Density: 36/km^{2} (94/sq mi)
- Time zone: UTC+01:00 (CET)
  - Summer (DST): UTC+02:00 (CEST)
- Postal codes: 23881
- Dialling codes: 04542
- Vehicle registration: RZ
- Website: www.amt-breitenfelde.de

Bälau is a municipality in the Breitenfelde collective municipality (Amt) located in the Lauenburg district (Kreis) in southeastern Schleswig-Holstein, Germany.

Bälau covers 6.50 square kilometers (1600 acres) which are mostly used for agriculture, with some forest.
