= Tramm =

Tramm may refer to:

- Tramm, Mecklenburg-Vorpommern, a municipality in Parchim, Mecklenburg-Vorpommern, Germany
- Tramm, Schleswig-Holstein, a municipality in Lauenburg, Schleswig-Holstein, Germany
- Tramm, a character in the Teen Titans animated series
- Tramm, a Transportation Management SaaS product from Opsi Systems
