= Wentorf =

Wentorf (German pronunciation: [ˈvɛntɔʁf]) may refer to the following municipalities in Germany:

- Wentorf bei Hamburg, in the district of Lauenburg, Schleswig-Holstein
- Wentorf, Sandesneben, part of the Amt Sandesneben, in the district of Lauenburg, Schleswig-Holstein

People with the surname Wentorf:

- Carl Wentorf (1863–1914), Danish painter
- Robert H. Wentorf, Jr., American scientist
