= Fitzen =

- Municipality
- Flag Coat of arms

- Location of Fitzen within Herzogtum Lauenburg district
- Interactive map of Fitzen
- Location within Germany Location within Schleswig-Holstein
- Coordinates: 53°30′N 10°39′E
- Country: Germany
- State: Schleswig-Holstein
- District: Herzogtum Lauenburg
- Municipal assoc.: Büchen

Government
  - Mayor: Martin Voß

Area
  - Total: 9.11 km^{2} (3.52 sq mi)
- Elevation: 25 m (82 ft)

Population (2025-12-31)
  - Total: 402
  - Density: 44.1/km^{2} (114/sq mi)
- Time zone: UTC+01:00 (CET)
  - Summer (DST): UTC+02:00 (CEST)
- Postal codes: 21514
- Dialling codes: 04155
- Vehicle registration: RZ
- Website: www.buechen.de

Fitzen (German pronunciation: [ˈfɪtsn̩]) is a municipality in the district of Lauenburg, in Schleswig-Holstein, Germany.
