= Alt Mölln =

- Municipality
- Flag Coat of arms

- Location of Alt Mölln within Herzogtum Lauenburg district
- Interactive map of Alt Mölln
- Location within Germany Location within Schleswig-Holstein
- Coordinates: 53°37′17″N 10°39′30″E
- Country: Germany
- State: Schleswig-Holstein
- District: Herzogtum Lauenburg
- Municipal assoc.: Breitenfelde

Government
  - Mayor: Ina Hahne

Area
  - Total: 6.44 km^{2} (2.49 sq mi)
- Elevation: 22 m (72 ft)

Population (2025-12-31)
  - Total: 833
  - Density: 129/km^{2} (335/sq mi)
- Time zone: UTC+01:00 (CET)
  - Summer (DST): UTC+02:00 (CEST)
- Postal codes: 23881
- Dialling codes: 04542
- Vehicle registration: RZ
- Website: www.amt- breitenfelde.de

Alt Mölln is a municipality in the district of Lauenburg, in Schleswig-Holstein, Germany.
