= Büchen (Amt) =

- Amt
- Coat of arms

- Map of Lauenburg highlighting Büchen
- Interactive map of Büchen
- Location within Germany Location within Schleswig-Holstein
- Coordinates: 53°29′N 10°34′E
- Country: Germany
- State: Schleswig-Holstein
- District: Lauenburg
- Seat: Büchen
- Subdivisions: 15 municipalities

Government
  - Mayor: Tanja Volkening

Area
  - Total: 193.04 km^{2} (74.53 sq mi)

Population (2025-12-31)
  - Total: 15,447
  - Density: 80.020/km^{2} (207.25/sq mi)
- Time zone: UTC+01:00 (CET)
  - Summer (DST): UTC+02:00 (CEST)
- Website: amt-buechen.eu

Büchen is an Amt ("collective municipality") in the district of Lauenburg, in Schleswig-Holstein, Germany. Its seat is in Büchen.

The Amt Büchen consists of the following municipalities:

1. Besenthal
2. Bröthen
3. Büchen
4. Fitzen
5. Göttin
6. Gudow
7. Güster
8. Klein Pampau
9. Langenlehsten
10. Müssen
11. Roseburg
12. Schulendorf
13. Siebeneichen
14. Tramm
15. Witzeeze
