= Klempau =

- Municipality
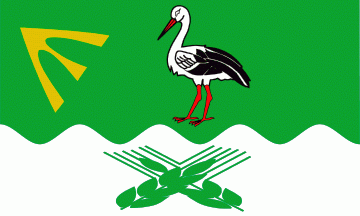
- Flag Coat of arms

- Location of Klempau within Herzogtum Lauenburg district
- Interactive map of Klempau
- Location within Germany Location within Schleswig-Holstein
- Coordinates: 53°46′N 10°40′E
- Country: Germany
- State: Schleswig-Holstein
- District: Herzogtum Lauenburg
- Municipal assoc.: Berkenthin

Government
  - Mayor: Karl Bartels

Area
  - Total: 10.07 km^{2} (3.89 sq mi)
- Elevation: 15 m (49 ft)

Population (2025-12-31)
  - Total: 603
  - Density: 59.9/km^{2} (155/sq mi)
- Time zone: UTC+01:00 (CET)
  - Summer (DST): UTC+02:00 (CEST)
- Postal codes: 23628
- Dialling codes: 04508
- Vehicle registration: RZ
- Website: www.amt- berkenthin.de

Klempau is a municipality in the district of Lauenburg, in Schleswig-Holstein, Germany. It is located south of the city of Lübeck and west of Ratzeburger See.

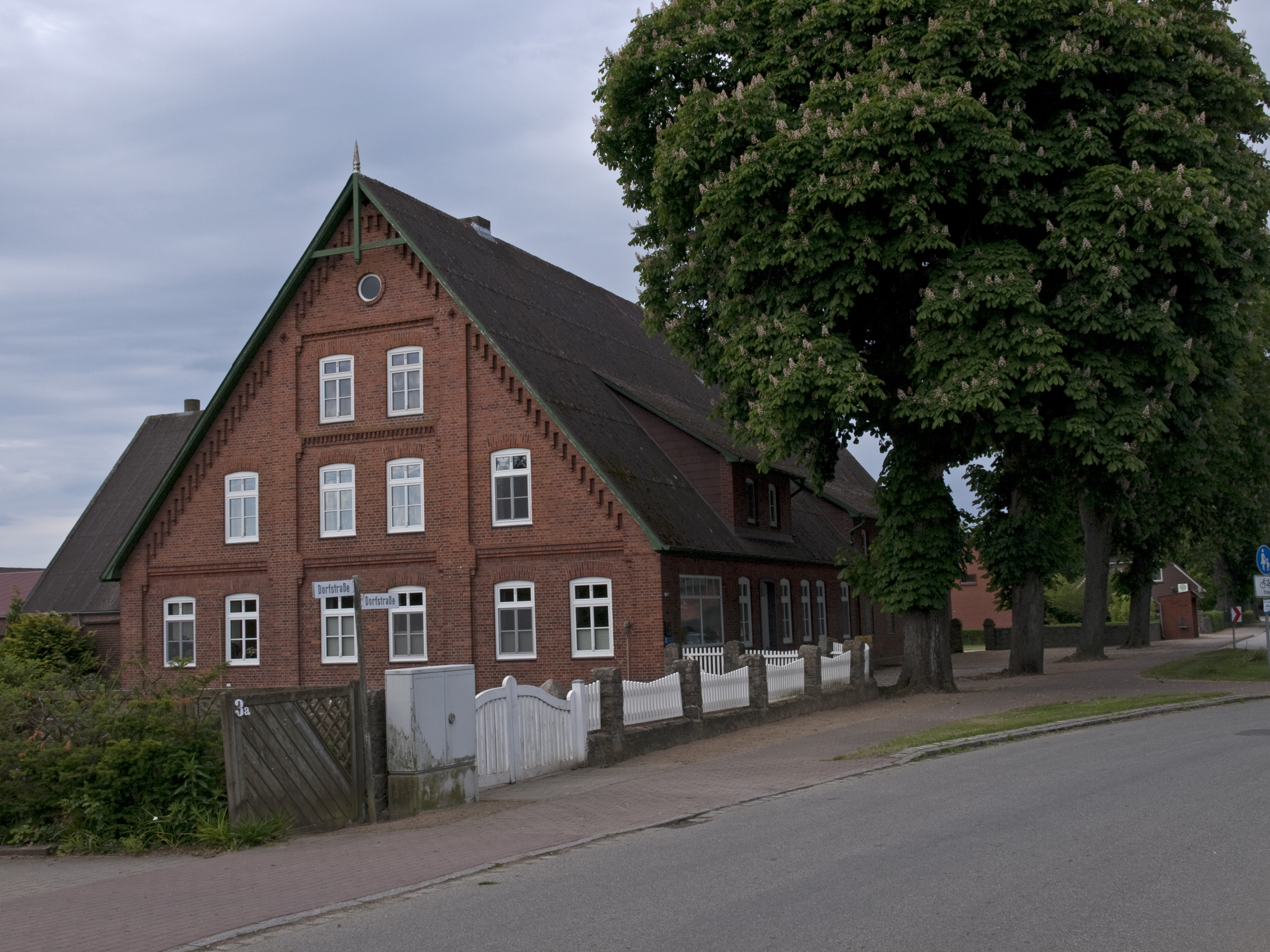
5 Dorfstrasse
