= Behlendorf =

- Municipality
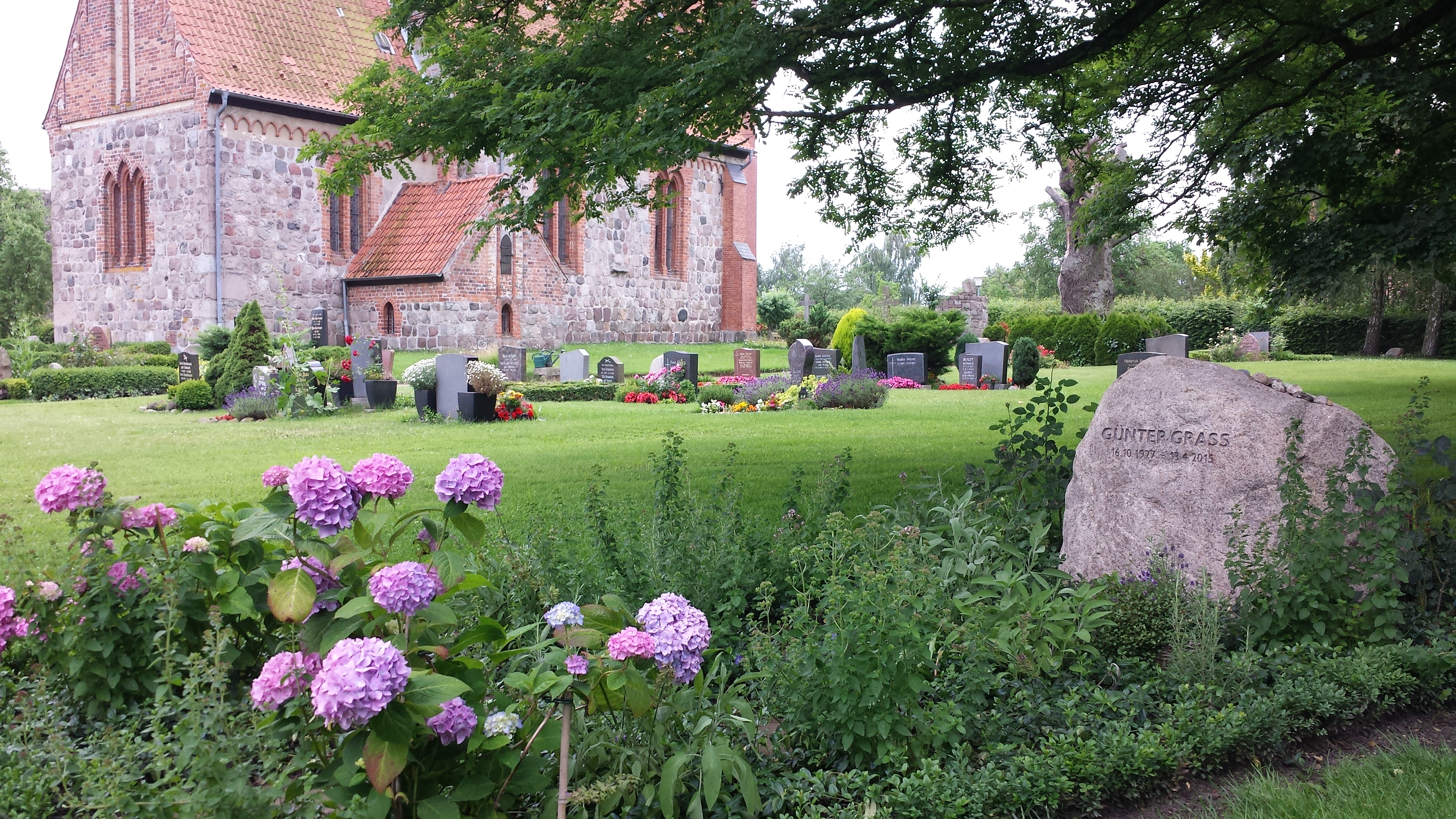
- Grave of Nobel laureate Günter Grass in Behlendorf

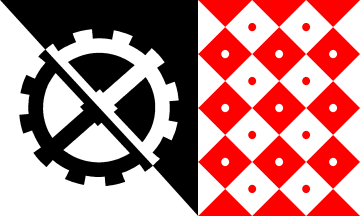
- Flag Coat of arms

- Location of Behlendorf within Herzogtum Lauenburg district
- Interactive map of Behlendorf
- Location within Germany Location within Schleswig-Holstein
- Coordinates: 53°42′N 10°40′E
- Country: Germany
- State: Schleswig-Holstein
- District: Herzogtum Lauenburg
- Municipal assoc.: Berkenthin

Government
  - Mayor: Renate Pfennigschmidt (CDU)

Area
  - Total: 10.25 km^{2} (3.96 sq mi)
- Elevation: 38 m (125 ft)

Population (2025-12-31)
  - Total: 397
  - Density: 38.7/km^{2} (100/sq mi)
- Time zone: UTC+01:00 (CET)
  - Summer (DST): UTC+02:00 (CEST)
- Postal codes: 23919
- Dialling codes: 04544
- Vehicle registration: RZ
- Website: www.amt- berkenthin.de

Behlendorf (German pronunciation: [ˈbeːləndɔʁf]) is a municipality in the district of Lauenburg, in Schleswig-Holstein, Germany.

This toponym was recorded as Belendorpe and Belendorp, in 1194, and as Belenthorp, in 1230.
