= Witzeeze =

- Municipality
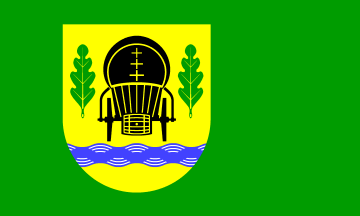
- Flag Coat of arms

- Location of Witzeeze within Herzogtum Lauenburg district
- Interactive map of Witzeeze
- Location within Germany Location within Schleswig-Holstein
- Coordinates: 53°27′N 10°37′E
- Country: Germany
- State: Schleswig-Holstein
- District: Herzogtum Lauenburg
- Municipal assoc.: Büchen

Government
  - Mayor: Heinz Wöhl-Bruhn

Area
  - Total: 10.46 km^{2} (4.04 sq mi)
- Elevation: 16 m (52 ft)

Population (2025-12-31)
  - Total: 952
  - Density: 91.0/km^{2} (236/sq mi)
- Time zone: UTC+01:00 (CET)
  - Summer (DST): UTC+02:00 (CEST)
- Postal codes: 21514
- Dialling codes: 04155
- Vehicle registration: RZ
- Website: www.buechen.de

Witzeeze is a municipality in the district of Lauenburg, in Schleswig-Holstein, Germany.
