= Borstorf =

- Municipality
- Flag Coat of arms

- Location of Borstorf within Herzogtum Lauenburg district
- Interactive map of Borstorf
- Location within Germany Location within Schleswig-Holstein
- Coordinates: 53°37′N 10°34′E
- Country: Germany
- State: Schleswig-Holstein
- District: Herzogtum Lauenburg
- Municipal assoc.: Breitenfelde

Government
  - Mayor: Hans-Joachim Krückmeyer

Area
  - Total: 8.65 km^{2} (3.34 sq mi)
- Elevation: 48 m (157 ft)

Population (2025-12-31)
  - Total: 303
  - Density: 35.0/km^{2} (90.7/sq mi)
- Time zone: UTC+01:00 (CET)
  - Summer (DST): UTC+02:00 (CEST)
- Postal codes: 23881
- Dialling codes: 04543
- Vehicle registration: RZ
- Website: www.amt- breitenfelde.de

Borstorf is a municipality in the district of Lauenburg, in Schleswig-Holstein, Germany.
