= Sandesneben-Nusse =

- Amt
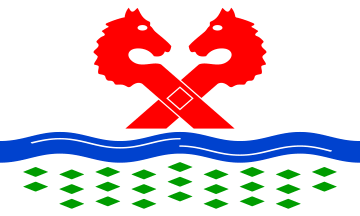
- Flag Coat of arms

- Map of Lauenburg highlighting Sandesneben-Nusse
- Interactive map of Sandesneben-Nusse
- Location within Germany Location within Schleswig-Holstein
- Coordinates: 53°41′N 10°30′E
- Country: Germany
- State: Schleswig-Holstein
- District: Lauenburg
- Founded: 2008
- Seat: Sandesneben
- Subdivisions: 25 municipalities

Government
  - Mayor: Ulrich Hardtke

Area
  - Total: 206.11 km^{2} (79.58 sq mi)

Population (2025-12-31)
  - Total: 15,777
  - Density: 76.547/km^{2} (198.25/sq mi)
- Time zone: UTC+01:00 (CET)
  - Summer (DST): UTC+02:00 (CEST)
- Website: amt-sandesneben-nusse.de

Sandesneben-Nusse is an Amt ("collective municipality") in the district of Lauenburg, in Schleswig-Holstein, Germany. Its seat is in Sandesneben. It was formed on 1 January 2008 from the former Ämter Sandesneben and Nusse.

The Amt Sandesneben-Nusse consists of the following municipalities:

1. Duvensee
2. Grinau
3. Groß Boden
4. Groß Schenkenberg
5. Klinkrade
6. Koberg
7. Kühsen
8. Labenz
9. Lankau
10. Linau
11. Lüchow
12. Nusse
13. Panten
14. Poggensee
15. Ritzerau
16. Sandesneben
17. Schiphorst
18. Schönberg
19. Schürensöhlen
20. Siebenbäumen
21. Sirksfelde
22. Steinhorst
23. Stubben
24. Walksfelde
25. Wentorf
