= Göttin =

- Municipality
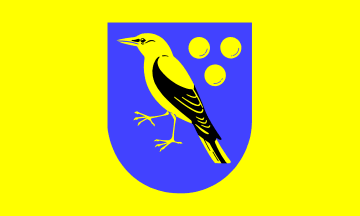
- Flag Coat of arms

- Location of Göttin within Herzogtum Lauenburg district
- Interactive map of Göttin
- Location within Germany Location within Schleswig-Holstein
- Coordinates: 53°31′49″N 10°42′12″E
- Country: Germany
- State: Schleswig-Holstein
- District: Herzogtum Lauenburg
- Municipal assoc.: Büchen

Government
  - Mayor: Karl-Heinz Finnern

Area
  - Total: 5.21 km^{2} (2.01 sq mi)
- Elevation: 32 m (105 ft)

Population (2025-12-31)
  - Total: 70
  - Density: 13/km^{2} (35/sq mi)
- Time zone: UTC+01:00 (CET)
  - Summer (DST): UTC+02:00 (CEST)
- Postal codes: 21514
- Dialling codes: 04158
- Vehicle registration: RZ
- Website: www.buechen.de

Göttin is a municipality in the district of Lauenburg, in Schleswig-Holstein, Germany.
