= Breitenfelde (Amt) =

- Amt
- Map of Lauenburg highlighting Breitenfelde
- Interactive map of Breitenfelde
- Location within Germany Location within Schleswig-Holstein
- Coordinates: 53°35′N 10°36′E
- Country: Germany
- State: Schleswig-Holstein
- District: Lauenburg
- Seat: Mölln
- Subdivisions: 11 municipalities

Government
  - Mayor: Christina Dibbern

Area
  - Total: 93.73 km^{2} (36.19 sq mi)

Population (2025-12-31)
  - Total: 7,004
  - Density: 74.73/km^{2} (193.5/sq mi)
- Time zone: UTC+01:00 (CET)
  - Summer (DST): UTC+02:00 (CEST)
- Website: amt-breitenfelde.de

Breitenfelde is an Amt ("collective municipality") in the district of Lauenburg, in Schleswig-Holstein, Germany. Its seat is in Mölln, itself not part of the Amt.

The Amt Breitenfelde consists of the following municipalities:

1. Alt Mölln
2. Bälau
3. Borstorf
4. Breitenfelde
5. Grambek
6. Hornbek
7. Lehmrade
8. Niendorf an der Stecknitz
9. Schretstaken
10. Talkau
11. Woltersdorf
