= Bliestorf =

- Municipality
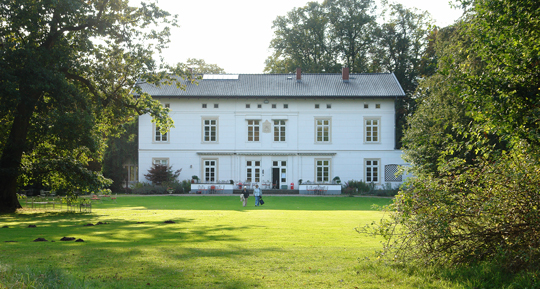

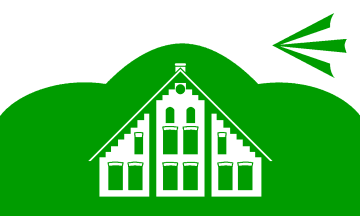
- Flag Coat of arms

- Location of Bliestorf within Herzogtum Lauenburg district
- Interactive map of Bliestorf
- Location within Germany Location within Schleswig-Holstein
- Coordinates: 53°46′25″N 10°36′10″E
- Country: Germany
- State: Schleswig-Holstein
- District: Herzogtum Lauenburg
- Municipal assoc.: Berkenthin

Government
  - Mayor: Georg Rudolf

Area
  - Total: 10.35 km^{2} (4.00 sq mi)
- Elevation: 19 m (62 ft)

Population (2025-12-31)
  - Total: 628
  - Density: 60.7/km^{2} (157/sq mi)
- Time zone: UTC+01:00 (CET)
  - Summer (DST): UTC+02:00 (CEST)
- Postal codes: 23847
- Dialling codes: 04501
- Vehicle registration: RZ
- Website: www.amt- berkenthin.de

Bliestorf is a municipality in the district of Lauenburg in Schleswig-Holstein, Germany.

== Sights ==
- Herrenhaus, built in 1843 by landowner and forester August Luis Detlev von Schrader (1827–1859) in the Swiss style.
