= Kastorf =

- Municipality
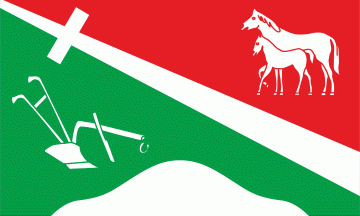
- Flag Coat of arms

- Location of Kastorf within Herzogtum Lauenburg district
- Interactive map of Kastorf
- Location within Germany Location within Schleswig-Holstein
- Coordinates: 53°44′57″N 10°34′14″E
- Country: Germany
- State: Schleswig-Holstein
- District: Herzogtum Lauenburg
- Municipal assoc.: Berkenthin

Government
  - Mayor: Wolfgang Wiedenhöft (SPD)

Area
  - Total: 6.9 km^{2} (2.7 sq mi)
- Elevation: 29 m (95 ft)

Population (2025-12-31)
  - Total: 1,234
  - Density: 180/km^{2} (460/sq mi)
- Time zone: UTC+01:00 (CET)
  - Summer (DST): UTC+02:00 (CEST)
- Postal codes: 23847
- Dialling codes: 04501
- Vehicle registration: RZ
- Website: www.amt- berkenthin.de

Kastorf is a municipality in the district of Lauenburg, in Schleswig-Holstein, Germany.
