= Schretstaken =

- Municipality
- Flag Coat of arms

- Location of Schretstaken within Herzogtum Lauenburg district
- Interactive map of Schretstaken
- Location within Germany Location within Schleswig-Holstein
- Coordinates: 53°35′N 10°33′E
- Country: Germany
- State: Schleswig-Holstein
- District: Herzogtum Lauenburg
- Municipal assoc.: Breitenfelde

Government
  - Mayor: Erich Püst

Area
  - Total: 8.47 km^{2} (3.27 sq mi)
- Elevation: 51 m (167 ft)

Population (2025-12-31)
  - Total: 495
  - Density: 58.4/km^{2} (151/sq mi)
- Time zone: UTC+01:00 (CET)
  - Summer (DST): UTC+02:00 (CEST)
- Postal codes: 21493
- Dialling codes: 04156
- Vehicle registration: RZ
- Website: www.amt- breitenfelde.de

Schretstaken is a municipality in the district of Lauenburg, in Schleswig-Holstein, Germany.
