= Roseburg, Schleswig-Holstein =

Roseburg
- Municipality
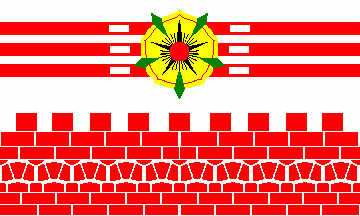
- Flag Coat of arms

- Location of Roseburg within Herzogtum Lauenburg district
- Interactive map of Roseburg
- Location within Germany Location within Schleswig-Holstein
- Coordinates: 53°32′N 10°37′E
- Country: Germany
- State: Schleswig-Holstein
- District: Herzogtum Lauenburg
- Municipal assoc.: Büchen

Government
  - Mayor: Otto Lübke

Area
  - Total: 16.24 km^{2} (6.27 sq mi)
- Elevation: 27 m (89 ft)

Population (2025-12-31)
  - Total: 548
  - Density: 33.7/km^{2} (87.4/sq mi)
- Time zone: UTC+01:00 (CET)
  - Summer (DST): UTC+02:00 (CEST)
- Postal codes: 21514
- Dialling codes: 04158
- Vehicle registration: RZ
- Website: www.buechen.de

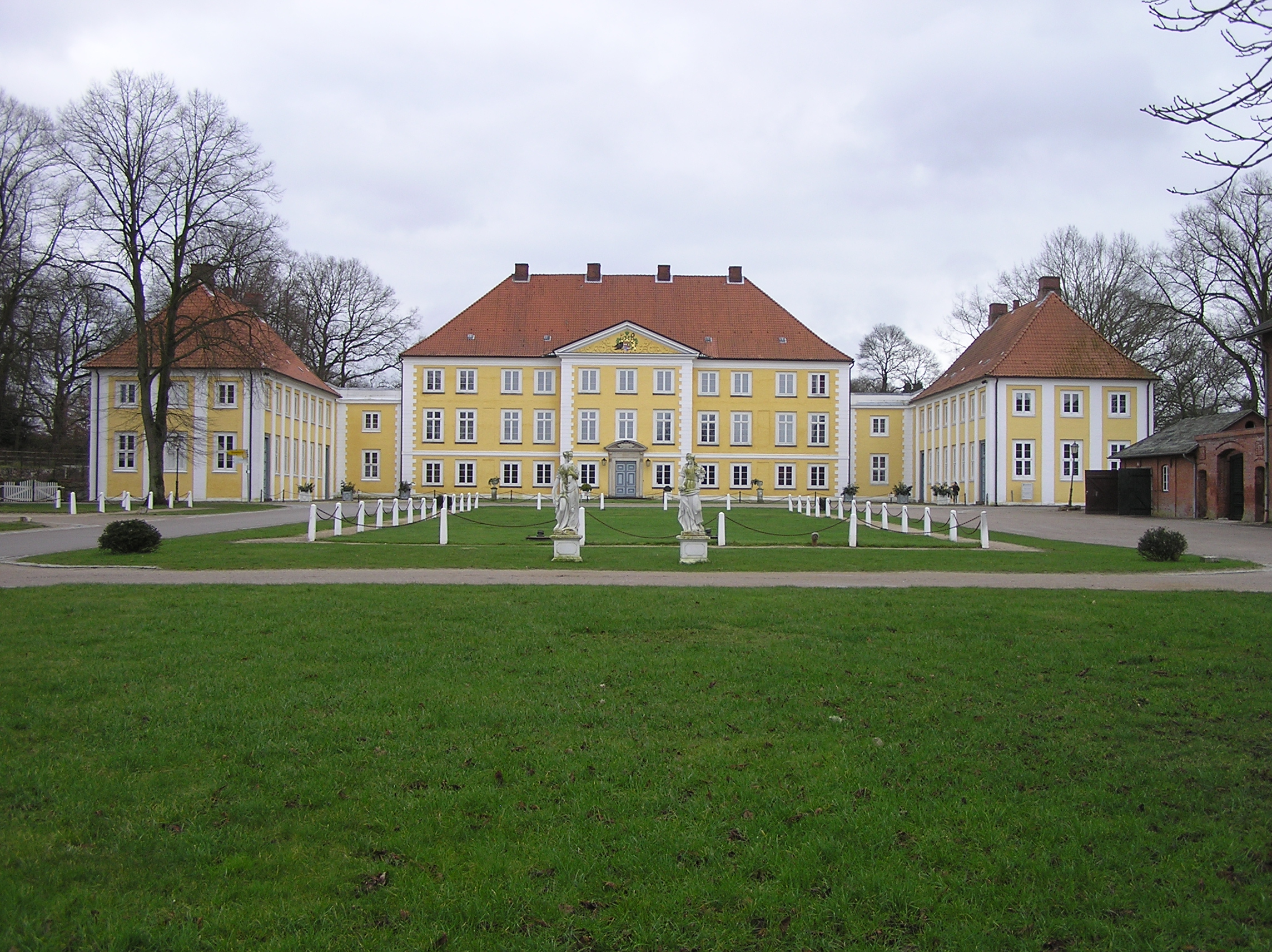
Wotersen Manor

Roseburg (German pronunciation: [ˈʁoːzəbʊʁk]) is a municipality in the district of Lauenburg, in Schleswig-Holstein, Germany.
