= Youngblood =

Youngblood, Youngbloods or Young Blood may refer to:

== Film and television ==
- Young Blood (1926 film), a German silent drama film
- Young Blood (1932 film), an American western film
- Young Blood (1943 film), a Swedish drama film
- Youngblood (1978 film), an American film starring Lawrence Hilton-Jacobs
- Youngblood (1986 film), an American film starring Rob Lowe
  - Youngblood (2025 film), a Canadian film, a remake of the 1986 original
- "Youngblood" (CSI: NY episode)
- "Young Bloods" (Falling Skies), an episode of Falling Skies
- Young Blood (TV series), a 2019 Chinese television series

== Music ==
=== Artists ===
- Youngblood (band), a Swedish boy band
- The Youngbloods, an American psychedelic rock band from the 1960s
- Youngblood Brass Band, a New Orleans band
- YoungBloodZ, an American hip-hop group
- Young Blood, a British 1960s group including Cozy Powell
- Yungblud, a British singer-songwriter
- Sydney Youngblood, an American singer
- Thomas Youngblood, an American guitarist and founding member of Kamelot

=== Albums ===
- The Young Bloods, a 1956 album by Donald Byrd
- The Youngbloods (album), a 1967 album by the Youngbloods
- Youngblood (Jon Faddis album) (1976)
- Youngblood (Original Motion Picture Soundtrack), a 1978 album by War
- Young Blood, a 1981 album by Alkatrazz
- Youngblood (Carl Wilson album) (1983)
- Young Blood (Jerry Lee Lewis album), 1985
- Youngblood (Elvin Jones album) (1992)
- Youngbloods (album), a 2010 album by the Amity Affliction
- Youngblood (Audrey Horne album) (2013)
- Young Blood (EP), a 2014 EP by Bea Miller
- Youngblood (5 Seconds of Summer album) (2018)
- Young Blood (Marcus King album), 2022
- Yungblud (album), self-titled album, 2022

=== Songs ===
- "Young Blood" (Coasters song) (1957)
- "Youngblood", a song by Survivor from the album Survivor (1979)
- "Young Bloods" (the Bronx song) (2008)
- "Youngblood," a song by American post-metal band Russian Circles from the album Station (2008)
- "Youngblood" (E.M.D. song) (2009)
- "Young Blood" (Norah Jones song) (2010)
- "Youngbloods" (The Amity Affliction song) (2010)
- "Young Blood" (The Naked and Famous song) (2010)
- "Youngblood" (Youngblood song) (2012)
- "Youngbloods", a song by Blessthefall from Hollow Bodies (2013)
- "Youngblood" a song by Glasvegas from Later...When the TV Turns to Static (2013)
- "Youngblood", a song by 3OH!3 from Omens (2013)
- "Young Blood" (Sophie Ellis-Bextor song) (2013)
- "Young Blood" (Bea Miller song) (2014)
- "Youngblood", a song by Green Day from Revolution Radio (2016)
- "Youngblood" (5 Seconds of Summer song) (2018)

== Other ==
- Youngblood (comics), a comic book superhero team from Image Comics
- Young Blood (novel) or Darkest Hour, a Mediator novel
- Young Bloods (novel), a historical novel by Simon Scarrow
- Wolfenstein: Youngblood, a 2019 video game
- Youngblood, a 1954 novel by John Oliver Killens
- Youngblood Priest, protagonist of the 1972 film Super Fly

== People ==
- Youngblood (surname), including a list of people with the name
- Alvin Youngblood Hart (born 1963), American musician
- Tim Chapman, nicknamed "Youngblood" (born 1965), American bounty hunter and reality television star

== See also ==
- Young blood transfusion
