= Siebeneichen =

- Municipality
- Coat of arms

- Location of Siebeneichen within Herzogtum Lauenburg district
- Interactive map of Siebeneichen
- Location within Germany Location within Schleswig-Holstein
- Coordinates: 53°31′N 10°37′E
- Country: Germany
- State: Schleswig-Holstein
- District: Herzogtum Lauenburg
- Municipal assoc.: Büchen

Government
  - Mayor: Karl-Heinz Weber

Area
  - Total: 4.68 km^{2} (1.81 sq mi)
- Elevation: 26 m (85 ft)

Population (2025-12-31)
  - Total: 292
  - Density: 62.4/km^{2} (162/sq mi)
- Time zone: UTC+01:00 (CET)
  - Summer (DST): UTC+02:00 (CEST)
- Postal codes: 21514
- Dialling codes: 04158
- Vehicle registration: RZ
- Website: www.buechen.de

Siebeneichen is a municipality in the district of Lauenburg, in Schleswig-Holstein, Germany.

The town's name is identical in meaning with Sevenoaks in England.
