= List of members of the Bundestag from the Duchy of Lauenburg =

List of elected members of the German Bundestag from the Duchy of Lauenburg

== Members ==
- Otto Christian Archibald von Bismarck (1953–1965) (CDU)
- Michael von Schmude (1994–1998) (CDU)
- Thomas Sauer (2002–2005) (SPD)
- Carl Eduard von Bismarck (2005–2007) (CDU), resigned on 10 Dec 2007
- Helmut Lamp (2007-) (CDU), replaced Bismarck
