= Langenlehsten =

- Municipality
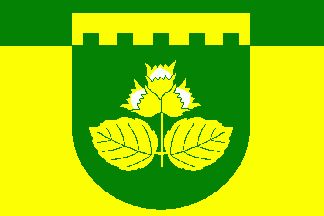
- Flag Coat of arms

- Location of Langenlehsten within Herzogtum Lauenburg district
- Interactive map of Langenlehsten
- Location within Germany Location within Schleswig-Holstein
- Coordinates: 53°30′N 10°44′E
- Country: Germany
- State: Schleswig-Holstein
- District: Herzogtum Lauenburg
- Municipal assoc.: Büchen

Government
  - Mayor: Wilhelm Knoch

Area
  - Total: 23.37 km^{2} (9.02 sq mi)
- Elevation: 26 m (85 ft)

Population (2025-12-31)
  - Total: 186
  - Density: 7.96/km^{2} (20.6/sq mi)
- Time zone: UTC+01:00 (CET)
  - Summer (DST): UTC+02:00 (CEST)
- Postal codes: 21514
- Dialling codes: 04155
- Vehicle registration: RZ
- Website: www.buechen.de

Langenlehsten is a municipality in the district of Lauenburg, in Schleswig-Holstein, Germany.
