= Klein Pampau =

- Municipality
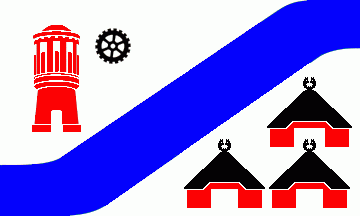
- Flag Coat of arms

- Location of Klein Pampau within Herzogtum Lauenburg district
- Interactive map of Klein Pampau
- Location within Germany Location within Schleswig-Holstein
- Coordinates: 53°31′N 10°35′E
- Country: Germany
- State: Schleswig-Holstein
- District: Herzogtum Lauenburg
- Municipal assoc.: Büchen

Government
  - Mayor: Gerhard Hellwig (SPD)

Area
  - Total: 4.17 km^{2} (1.61 sq mi)
- Elevation: 21 m (69 ft)

Population (2025-12-31)
  - Total: 688
  - Density: 165/km^{2} (427/sq mi)
- Time zone: UTC+01:00 (CET)
  - Summer (DST): UTC+02:00 (CEST)
- Postal codes: 21514
- Dialling codes: 04155
- Vehicle registration: RZ
- Website: www.buechen.de

Klein Pampau is a municipality in the district of Lauenburg, in Schleswig-Holstein, Germany.
