= Grambek =

- Municipality
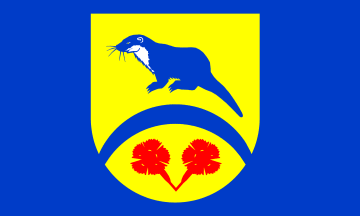
- Flag Coat of arms

- Location of Grambek within Herzogtum Lauenburg district
- Interactive map of Grambek
- Location within Germany Location within Schleswig-Holstein
- Coordinates: 53°34′N 10°41′E
- Country: Germany
- State: Schleswig-Holstein
- District: Herzogtum Lauenburg
- Municipal assoc.: Breitenfelde

Government
  - Mayor: Christian Ries

Area
  - Total: 12.66 km^{2} (4.89 sq mi)
- Elevation: 28 m (92 ft)

Population (2025-12-31)
  - Total: 567
  - Density: 44.8/km^{2} (116/sq mi)
- Time zone: UTC+01:00 (CET)
  - Summer (DST): UTC+02:00 (CEST)
- Postal codes: 23883
- Dialling codes: 04542
- Vehicle registration: RZ
- Website: www.amt- breitenfelde.de

Grambek is a municipality in the district of Lauenburg, in Schleswig-Holstein, Germany.
