= Jungblut =

Jungblut is a surname. Notable people with the surname include:

- Brett Jungblut, American professional poker player
- Tanumafili Jungblut (born 1990), American Samoan Olympic weightlifter
- Viviane Jungblut (born 1996), Brazilian swimmer

== See also ==
- Youngblood (disambiguation)
