= Krummesse =

- Municipality
- Flag Coat of arms

- Location of Krummesse within Herzogtum Lauenburg district
- Interactive map of Krummesse
- Location within Germany Location within Schleswig-Holstein
- Coordinates: 53°46′N 10°38′E
- Country: Germany
- State: Schleswig-Holstein
- District: Herzogtum Lauenburg
- Municipal assoc.: Berkenthin

Government
  - Mayor: Friedhelm Michaelis (CDU)

Area
  - Total: 3.42 km^{2} (1.32 sq mi)
- Elevation: 20 m (66 ft)

Population (2025-12-31)
  - Total: 1,645
  - Density: 481/km^{2} (1,250/sq mi)
- Time zone: UTC+01:00 (CET)
  - Summer (DST): UTC+02:00 (CEST)
- Postal codes: 23628
- Dialling codes: 04508
- Vehicle registration: RZ
- Website: www.amt- berkenthin.de

Krummesse is a municipality in the district of Lauenburg, in Schleswig-Holstein, Germany.
