= Besenthal =

- Municipality
- Flag Coat of arms

- Location of Besenthal within Herzogtum Lauenburg district
- Interactive map of Besenthal
- Location within Germany Location within Schleswig-Holstein
- Coordinates: 53°31′47″N 10°44′26″E
- Country: Germany
- State: Schleswig-Holstein
- District: Herzogtum Lauenburg
- Municipal assoc.: Büchen

Government
  - Mayor: Florian Schmidt

Area
  - Total: 12.65 km^{2} (4.88 sq mi)
- Elevation: 29 m (95 ft)

Population (2025-12-31)
  - Total: 100
  - Density: 7.9/km^{2} (20/sq mi)
- Time zone: UTC+01:00 (CET)
  - Summer (DST): UTC+02:00 (CEST)
- Postal codes: 23899
- Dialling codes: 04547
- Vehicle registration: RZ
- Website: www.buechen.de

Besenthal (German pronunciation: [ˈbeːzn̩taːl]) is a municipality in the district of Lauenburg, in Schleswig-Holstein, Germany.
