= Bröthen =

- Municipality
- Coat of arms

- Location of Bröthen within Herzogtum Lauenburg district
- Interactive map of Bröthen
- Location within Germany Location within Schleswig-Holstein
- Coordinates: 53°29′N 10°40′E
- Country: Germany
- State: Schleswig-Holstein
- District: Herzogtum Lauenburg
- Municipal assoc.: Büchen

Government
  - Mayor: Walter Burmester

Area
  - Total: 10.69 km^{2} (4.13 sq mi)
- Elevation: 23 m (75 ft)

Population (2025-12-31)
  - Total: 327
  - Density: 30.6/km^{2} (79.2/sq mi)
- Time zone: UTC+01:00 (CET)
  - Summer (DST): UTC+02:00 (CEST)
- Postal codes: 21514
- Dialling codes: 04155
- Vehicle registration: RZ
- Website: www.buechen.de

Bröthen (German pronunciation: [ˈbʁøːtn̩]) is a municipality in the district of Lauenburg, in Schleswig-Holstein, Germany.
