= Berkenthin (Amt) =

- Amt
- Map of Lauenburg highlighting Berkenthin
- Interactive map of Berkenthin
- Location within Germany Location within Schleswig-Holstein
- Coordinates: 53°43′N 10°39′E
- Country: Germany
- State: Schleswig-Holstein
- District: Lauenburg
- Seat: Berkenthin
- Subdivisions: 11 municipalities

Government
  - Mayor: Frank Hase

Area
  - Total: 76.83 km^{2} (29.66 sq mi)

Population (2025-12-31)
  - Total: 8,516
  - Density: 110.8/km^{2} (287.1/sq mi)
- Time zone: UTC+01:00 (CET)
  - Summer (DST): UTC+02:00 (CEST)
- Website: berkenthin-amt.de

Berkenthin is an Amt ("collective municipality") in the district of Lauenburg, in Schleswig-Holstein, Germany. Its seat is in Berkenthin.

The Amt Berkenthin consists of the following municipalities:

1. Behlendorf
2. Berkenthin
3. Bliestorf
4. Düchelsdorf
5. Göldenitz
6. Kastorf
7. Klempau
8. Krummesse
9. Niendorf bei Berkenthin
10. Rondeshagen
11. Sierksrade
