= Lehmrade =

- Municipality
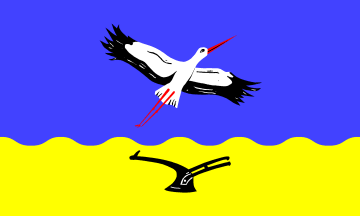
- Flag Coat of arms

- Location of Lehmrade within Herzogtum Lauenburg district
- Interactive map of Lehmrade
- Location within Germany Location within Schleswig-Holstein
- Coordinates: 53°36′N 10°45′E
- Country: Germany
- State: Schleswig-Holstein
- District: Herzogtum Lauenburg
- Municipal assoc.: Breitenfelde

Government
  - Mayor: Cornelia Wagnitz

Area
  - Total: 11.40 km^{2} (4.40 sq mi)
- Elevation: 31 m (102 ft)

Population (2025-12-31)
  - Total: 636
  - Density: 55.8/km^{2} (144/sq mi)
- Time zone: UTC+01:00 (CET)
  - Summer (DST): UTC+02:00 (CEST)
- Postal codes: 23883
- Dialling codes: 04542
- Vehicle registration: RZ
- Website: www.amt- breitenfelde.de

Lehmrade is a municipality in the district of Lauenburg, in Schleswig-Holstein, Germany.
