= Ziethen, Schleswig-Holstein =

Ziethen
- Municipality
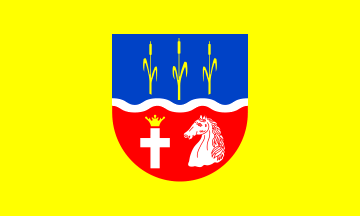
- Flag Coat of arms

- Location of Ziethen within Herzogtum Lauenburg district
- Interactive map of Ziethen
- Location within Germany Location within Schleswig-Holstein
- Coordinates: 53°42′N 10°49′E
- Country: Germany
- State: Schleswig-Holstein
- District: Herzogtum Lauenburg
- Municipal assoc.: Lauenburgische Seen

Government
  - Mayor: Karl-Horst Salzsäuler

Area
  - Total: 11.18 km^{2} (4.32 sq mi)
- Elevation: 48 m (157 ft)

Population (2025-12-31)
  - Total: 1,197
  - Density: 107.1/km^{2} (277.3/sq mi)
- Time zone: UTC+01:00 (CET)
  - Summer (DST): UTC+02:00 (CEST)
- Postal codes: 23911
- Dialling codes: 04541
- Vehicle registration: RZ
- Website: www.amt-lauenburgische-seen.de

Ziethen (German pronunciation: [ˈtsiːtn̩]) is a municipality in the district of Lauenburg, in Schleswig-Holstein, Germany.

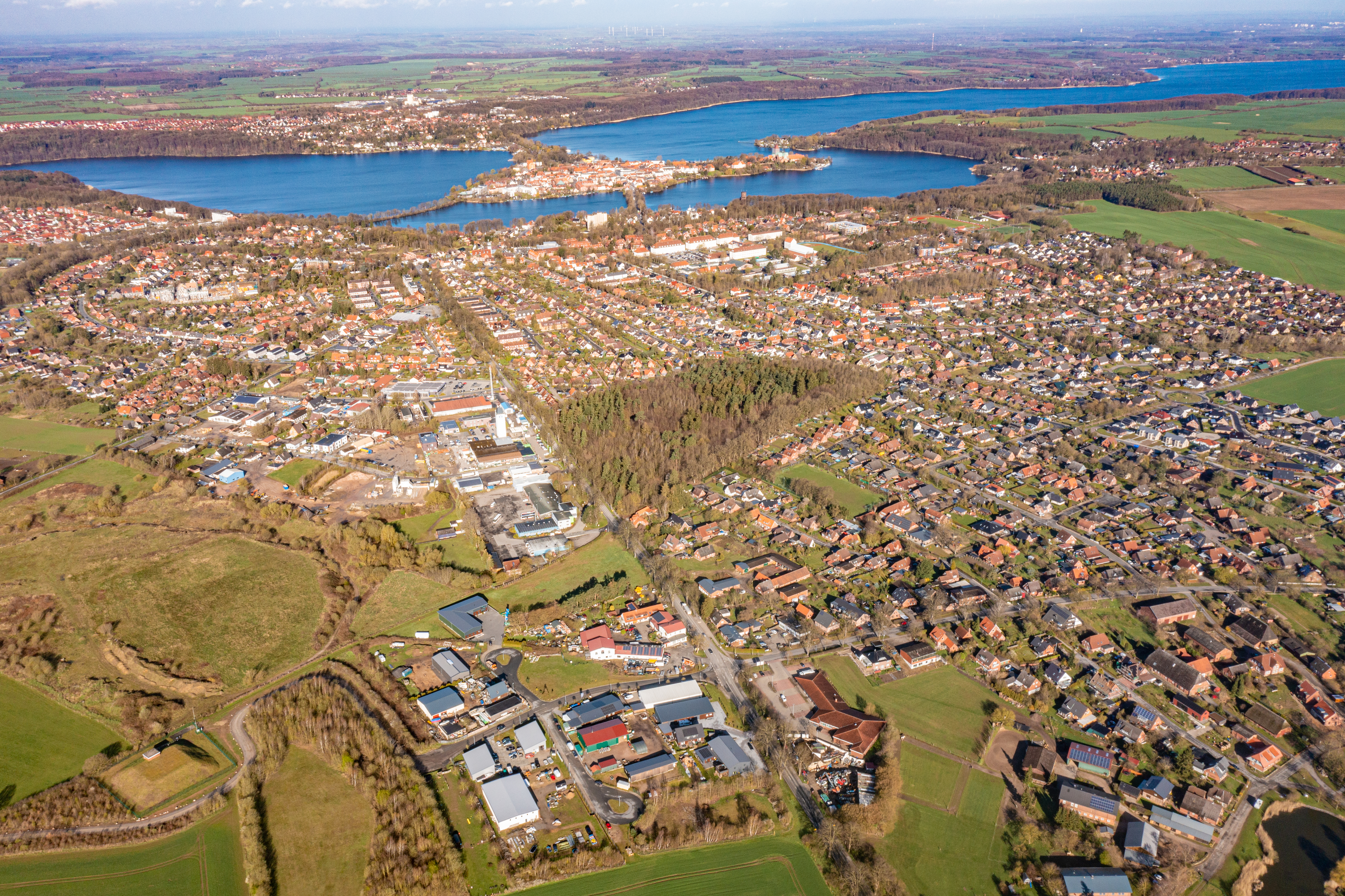
Ziethen, in the background Ratzeburg
