= Müssen =

- Municipality
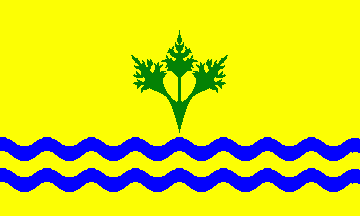
- Flag Coat of arms

- Location of Müssen within Herzogtum Lauenburg district
- Interactive map of Müssen
- Location within Germany Location within Schleswig-Holstein
- Coordinates: 53°30′N 10°34′E
- Country: Germany
- State: Schleswig-Holstein
- District: Herzogtum Lauenburg
- Municipal assoc.: Büchen

Government
  - Mayor: Detlef Dehr (AfD)

Area
  - Total: 11.46 km^{2} (4.42 sq mi)
- Elevation: 28 m (92 ft)

Population (2025-12-31)
  - Total: 1,247
  - Density: 108.8/km^{2} (281.8/sq mi)
- Time zone: UTC+01:00 (CET)
  - Summer (DST): UTC+02:00 (CEST)
- Postal codes: 21516
- Dialling codes: 04151, 04155
- Vehicle registration: RZ
- Website: www.buechen.de

Müssen (German pronunciation: [ˈmʏsn̩]) is a municipality in the district of Lauenburg, in Schleswig-Holstein, Germany.

Müssen (Muessen, see also Meissen) translates literally as "Mosses" or commonly as "Marsh."
