= Düchelsdorf =

- Municipality
- Coat of arms

- Location of Düchelsdorf within Herzogtum Lauenburg district
- Interactive map of Düchelsdorf
- Location within Germany Location within Schleswig-Holstein
- Coordinates: 53°44′N 10°34′E
- Country: Germany
- State: Schleswig-Holstein
- District: Herzogtum Lauenburg
- Municipal assoc.: Berkenthin

Government
  - Mayor: Adolf Kahts

Area
  - Total: 3.01 km^{2} (1.16 sq mi)
- Elevation: 45 m (148 ft)

Population (2025-12-31)
  - Total: 165
  - Density: 54.8/km^{2} (142/sq mi)
- Time zone: UTC+01:00 (CET)
  - Summer (DST): UTC+02:00 (CEST)
- Postal codes: 23847
- Dialling codes: 04501
- Vehicle registration: RZ
- Website: berkenthin-amt.de

Düchelsdorf is a municipality in the district of Lauenburg, in Schleswig-Holstein, Germany.
