= Sierksrade =

- Municipality
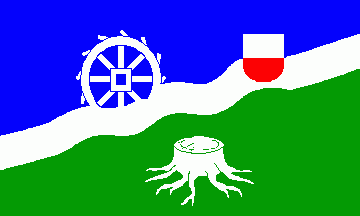
- Flag Coat of arms

- Location of Sierksrade within Herzogtum Lauenburg district
- Interactive map of Sierksrade
- Location within Germany Location within Schleswig-Holstein
- Coordinates: 53°44′N 10°36′E
- Country: Germany
- State: Schleswig-Holstein
- District: Herzogtum Lauenburg
- Municipal assoc.: Berkenthin

Government
  - Mayor: Johannes Dohrendorff

Area
  - Total: 4 km^{2} (1.5 sq mi)
- Elevation: 24 m (79 ft)

Population (2025-12-31)
  - Total: 432
  - Density: 110/km^{2} (280/sq mi)
- Time zone: UTC+01:00 (CET)
  - Summer (DST): UTC+02:00 (CEST)
- Postal codes: 23847
- Dialling codes: 04501
- Vehicle registration: RZ
- Website: www.amt- berkenthin.de

Sierksrade is a municipality in the district of Lauenburg, in Schleswig-Holstein, Germany.
