= Woltersdorf, Schleswig-Holstein =

Woltersdorf
- Municipality
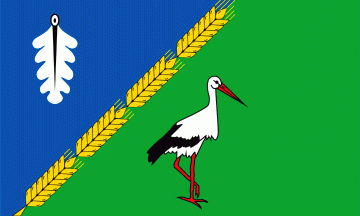
- Flag Coat of arms

- Location of Woltersdorf within Herzogtum Lauenburg district
- Interactive map of Woltersdorf
- Location within Germany Location within Schleswig-Holstein
- Coordinates: 53°35′N 10°38′E
- Country: Germany
- State: Schleswig-Holstein
- District: Herzogtum Lauenburg
- Municipal assoc.: Breitenfelde

Government
  - Mayor: Rainer Schmitt

Area
  - Total: 7.9 km^{2} (3.1 sq mi)
- Elevation: 37 m (121 ft)

Population (2025-12-31)
  - Total: 347
  - Density: 44/km^{2} (110/sq mi)
- Time zone: UTC+01:00 (CET)
  - Summer (DST): UTC+02:00 (CEST)
- Postal codes: 21516
- Dialling codes: 04542
- Vehicle registration: RZ
- Website: www.amt-breitenfelde.de

Woltersdorf (German pronunciation: [ˈvɔltɐsdɔʁf]) is a municipality in the district of Lauenburg, in Schleswig-Holstein, Germany.
