= Grinau =

- Municipality
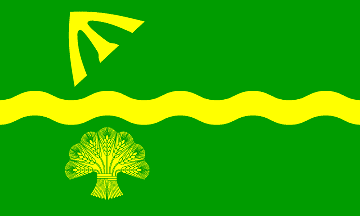
- Flag Coat of arms

- Location of Grinau within Herzogtum Lauenburg district
- Interactive map of Grinau
- Location within Germany Location within Schleswig-Holstein
- Coordinates: 53°46′42″N 10°32′53″E
- Country: Germany
- State: Schleswig-Holstein
- District: Herzogtum Lauenburg
- Municipal assoc.: Sandesneben-Nusse

Government
  - Mayor: Birgit Kraus

Area
  - Total: 2.74 km^{2} (1.06 sq mi)
- Elevation: 22 m (72 ft)

Population (2025-12-31)
  - Total: 266
  - Density: 97.1/km^{2} (251/sq mi)
- Time zone: UTC+01:00 (CET)
  - Summer (DST): UTC+02:00 (CEST)
- Postal codes: 23847
- Dialling codes: 04501
- Vehicle registration: RZ
- Website: www.grinau.de

Grinau (German pronunciation: [ˈɡʁiːnaʊ]) is a municipality in the district of Lauenburg, in Schleswig-Holstein, Germany.
