= Koberg =

- Municipality
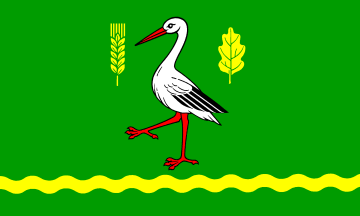
- Flag Coat of arms

- Location of Koberg within Herzogtum Lauenburg district
- Interactive map of Koberg
- Location within Germany Location within Schleswig-Holstein
- Coordinates: 53°38′N 10°31′E
- Country: Germany
- State: Schleswig-Holstein
- District: Herzogtum Lauenburg
- Municipal assoc.: Sandesneben-Nusse

Government
  - Mayor: Jörg Smolla

Area
  - Total: 11.98 km^{2} (4.63 sq mi)
- Elevation: 50 m (160 ft)

Population (2025-12-31)
  - Total: 788
  - Density: 65.8/km^{2} (170/sq mi)
- Time zone: UTC+01:00 (CET)
  - Summer (DST): UTC+02:00 (CEST)
- Postal codes: 23881
- Dialling codes: 04154, 04543
- Vehicle registration: RZ
- Website: www.amt- sandesneben- nusse.de

Koberg (German pronunciation: [ˈkoːbɛʁk]) is a municipality in the district of Lauenburg, in Schleswig-Holstein, Germany.
