= Youngblood (surname) =

Youngblood is a surname. Notable people with the name include:

- Betty Youngblood, president of Lake Superior State University in Sault Ste. Marie, Michigan
- Brenna Youngblood (born 1979), American artist
- Francis M. Youngblood (1835–1907), American lawyer and politician
- Gene Youngblood (1942–2021), media art theorist
- Harold F. Youngblood (1907–1983), U.S. Representative from Michigan
- Jack Youngblood (born 1950), NFL Hall of Fame player
- Jay Youngblood or Steve Romero (1955–1985), American professional wrestler
- Jim Youngblood (born 1950), former NFL player
- Joel Youngblood (born 1951), former all-star baseball player
- Joshua Youngblood (born 2001), American football player
- Kenny Youngblood, American motorsports artist
- Lonnie Youngblood (born 1941), saxophonist and bandleader
- Luke Youngblood (born 1986), actor
- Mary Youngblood (born 1958), Native American flutist
- Monica Youngblood, American politician
- Rosita Youngblood (born 1946), member of the Pennsylvania House of Representatives, 198th District
- Rudy Youngblood or Tee-Dee-Nae (born 1982), actor
- Rufus Youngblood (1924–1996), United States Secret Service agent
- Sydney Youngblood (born 1960), American-born German singer
- Tally Youngblood, a character in the Uglies series
- Thomas Youngblood (born 1974), guitarist and founding member of Kamelot
- Larry Youngblood, criminal defendant in the Supreme Court case Arizona v. Youngblood
