= Nusse =

- Municipality
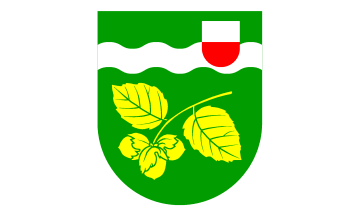
- Flag Coat of arms

- Location of Nusse within Herzogtum Lauenburg district
- Interactive map of Nusse
- Location within Germany Location within Schleswig-Holstein
- Coordinates: 53°40′N 10°35′E
- Country: Germany
- State: Schleswig-Holstein
- District: Herzogtum Lauenburg
- Municipal assoc.: Sandesneben-Nusse

Government
  - Mayor: Lars Wunsch (CDU)

Area
  - Total: 6.22 km^{2} (2.40 sq mi)
- Elevation: 31 m (102 ft)

Population (2025-12-31)
  - Total: 1,154
  - Density: 186/km^{2} (481/sq mi)
- Time zone: UTC+01:00 (CET)
  - Summer (DST): UTC+02:00 (CEST)
- Postal codes: 23896
- Dialling codes: 04543
- Vehicle registration: RZ
- Website: www.amt-sandesneben-nusse.de

Nusse (German pronunciation: [ˈnʊsə]; Low German: Nuss) is a municipality in the district of Lauenburg, in Schleswig-Holstein, Germany. It is situated approximately 13 km west of Ratzeburg, and 25 km southwest of Lübeck.

Nusse is part of the Amt ("collective municipality") Sandesneben-Nusse.
