= Kühsen =

- Municipality
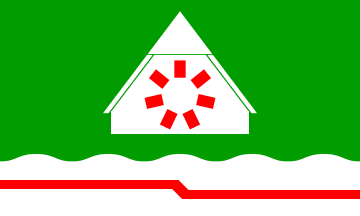
- Flag Coat of arms

- Location of Kühsen within Herzogtum Lauenburg district
- Interactive map of Kühsen
- Location within Germany Location within Schleswig-Holstein
- Coordinates: 53°41′2″N 10°36′48″E
- Country: Germany
- State: Schleswig-Holstein
- District: Herzogtum Lauenburg
- Municipal assoc.: Sandesneben-Nusse

Government
  - Mayor: Franz-Jürgen Prüsmann

Area
  - Total: 7.28 km^{2} (2.81 sq mi)
- Elevation: 28 m (92 ft)

Population (2025-12-31)
  - Total: 358
  - Density: 49.2/km^{2} (127/sq mi)
- Time zone: UTC+01:00 (CET)
  - Summer (DST): UTC+02:00 (CEST)
- Postal codes: 23898
- Dialling codes: 04543
- Vehicle registration: RZ
- Website: www.amt- sandesneben- nusse.de

Kühsen (German pronunciation: [ˈkyːzn̩]) is a municipality in the district of Lauenburg, in Schleswig-Holstein, Germany. It is around 20 km south of Lübeck, and around 40 km north-east of Hamburg.
