= Steinhorst, Schleswig-Holstein =

Steinhorst
- Municipality
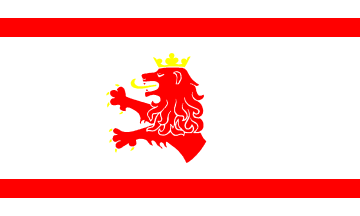
- Flag Coat of arms

- Location of Steinhorst within Lauenburg district
- Interactive map of Steinhorst
- Location within Germany Location within Schleswig-Holstein
- Coordinates: 53°43′15″N 10°29′11″E
- Country: Germany
- State: Schleswig-Holstein
- District: Lauenburg
- Municipal assoc.: Sandesneben-Nusse

Government
  - Mayor: Horst Wardius

Area
  - Total: 16.37 km^{2} (6.32 sq mi)
- Elevation: 63 m (207 ft)

Population (2025-12-31)
  - Total: 565
  - Density: 34.5/km^{2} (89.4/sq mi)
- Time zone: UTC+01:00 (CET)
  - Summer (DST): UTC+02:00 (CEST)
- Postal codes: 23847
- Dialling codes: 04536
- Vehicle registration: RZ
- Website: www.amt-sandesneben.de

Steinhorst (which roughly translates as Stone Refuge) is a municipality in Kreis Herzogtum Lauenburg in Schleswig-Holstein. It belongs to the Amt Sandesneben-Nusse.

== Geography ==
The municipality size amounts to 16.37 km². Of it 5.8 km² is forest, and 8.2 km² is agricultural land, which are ordered by 2 district domains and 1 agricultural enterprise. In the forest is the Wehrenteich (in English, weir pond), which has a surface of 220,000 square metres.

== History ==
- 1315 The first recorded mention of Steinhorst.
- 1691 bought Magnus von Wedderkop Steinhorst.
- 1739 gave Gottfried up v. Wedderkop Steinhorst.
- 1928 Steinhorst became an independent political municipality.

== Other ==
Steinhorst has a volunteer fire-brigade. The number of active members amounted to, at the end of 2004, 29 members. The employment vehicle is an LF8 with a festinstallierten delete foam plant, which is pressurized by means of air bottle and is thus ready for use. The mayor of the municipality, Heinz-Peter Strunck, has been in office for 27 years.

In addition Steinhorst is well known for its legendary Scheunenfeten, which always attract several thousand visitors. In addition once in the year a Stoppelfete between Steinhorst and Schiphorst takes place, attracting roughly 5000 visitors each year.
