= District of Duchy of Lauenburg =

Coordinates: 53°35′N 10°40′E

Duchy of Lauenburg
- District
- Flag Coat of arms
- Country: Germany
- State: Schleswig-Holstein
- Capital: Ratzeburg

Government
  - District admin.: Christoph Mager (CDU)

Area
  - Total: 1,263 km^{2} (488 sq mi)

Population (31 December 2024)
  - Total: 206,235
  - Density: 163.3/km^{2} (422.9/sq mi)
- Time zone: UTC+01:00 (CET)
  - Summer (DST): UTC+02:00 (CEST)
- Vehicle registration: RZ
- Website: herzogtum-lauenburg.de

Duchy of Lauenburg (German: Herzogtum Lauenburg [ˈhɛʁtsoːktuːm ˈlaʊənbʊʁk]) is the southernmost Kreis, or district, officially called District of Duchy of Lauenburg (German: Kreis Herzogtum Lauenburg), of Schleswig-Holstein, Germany. It is bordered by (from the west and clockwise) the district of Stormarn, the city of Lübeck, the state of Mecklenburg-Vorpommern (districts of Nordwestmecklenburg and Ludwigslust-Parchim), the state of Lower Saxony (districts of Lüneburg and Harburg), and the city state of Hamburg. The district of Herzogtum Lauenburg is named after the former Duchy of Saxe-Lauenburg.

== Geography ==
The district's territory comprises most of the former Duchy's territory north of the river Elbe, except of the Amt Neuhaus. All the former Saxe-Lauenburgian areas beyond the Elbe belong today to the Lower Saxon districts of Cuxhaven (Land of Hadeln), Harburg and Lüneburg.

The district's area contains a number of historically important towns, e.g. Lauenburg, Mölln and Ratzeburg. This importance was due to the Old Salt Route (Alte Salzstraße), one of the major medieval trade routes. Salt from the salt-works south of the Elbe river was transported northward to Lübeck. The transport of salt was also the motive for constructing the oldest artificial waterway of Europe, the Stecknitz Canal (1398). It was replaced in 1900 by the Elbe-Lübeck Canal.

The landscape is characterised by numerous lakes, forming the Lauenburg Lakes Nature Park. The largest lake is the Ratzeburger See with an area of 16 km^{2}.

== History ==
The district Herzogtum Lauenburg is named after the medieval Duchy of Saxe-Lauenburg, which was one of the remnants of the original Duchy of Saxony. The Duchy of Saxony was partitioned in a process started in 1269, nine years after in 1260 Albert II and John I had succeeded their father Albert I of Saxony. In 1269, 1272 and 1282, the brothers gradually divided their governing competences within the three territorially unconnected Saxon areas along the Elbe river (one called Land of Hadeln, another around Lauenburg upon Elbe and the third around Wittenberg upon Elbe), thus preparing a partition.

After John I's resignation in 1282, Albert II ruled with his still minor nephews Albert III, Eric I and John II, who by 1296 definitely partitioned the duchy providing Saxe-Lauenburg for the brothers, and Saxe-Wittenberg for their uncle Albert II. The last document, mentioning the brothers and their uncle Albert II as Saxon fellow dukes dates back to 1295. A deed of 20 September 1296, circumscribing Saxe-Lauenburg, mentions the Vierlande (now Hamburg), Sadelbande (Land of Lauenburg), the Land of Ratzeburg, the Land of Darzing (later Amt Neuhaus), and the Land of Hadeln (the latter two now Lower Saxony) as the joint territory of the brothers, separate of Saxe-Wittenberg.

Saxe-Lauenburg was also known simply as Lauenburg. While the territory of Saxe-Wittenberg changed drastically over the centuries, the Duchy of Lauenburg remained almost unchanged, until it lost its independence in 1689, when it was inherited by the Principality of Lüneburg. From 1815–1864 it was ruled in personal union by the Duke of Holstein, being simultaneously King of Denmark. In 1864 it fell to Prussia after the Second Schleswig War. For a short period Lauenburg was still an autonomous entity, but in 1876 it was incorporated as a district into the Prussian province of Schleswig-Holstein.

Lauenburg upon Elbe was the first capital and name-giving to the Duchy, before it moved in 1619 to Ratzeburg, which remained the capital also when the Duchy was downgraded to a district within Prussia. In 1937—by a territorial redeployment within the scope of the Greater Hamburg Act—the city of Geesthacht (formerly a part of Hamburg), some Mecklenburgian exclaves, including Ratzeburg's Cathedral immunity district, and some Lübeckian exclaves within the district territory, were incorporated into the district.

In May 1945 British forces captured the district territory, which in September 1944 had been determined in the London Protocol to become part of the British Zone of Occupation. On 13 November 1945 the British general Colin Muir Barber and the Soviet general major Nikolay Grigoryevich Lyashchenko (Russian: Николай Григорьевич Лященко) signed the Barber-Lyashchenko Agreement (or the Gadebusch Agreement) in Gadebusch, redeploying some municipalities of the Duchy of Lauenburg District and neighbouring Mecklenburg, then part of the Soviet Zone of Occupation. Thus some eastern suburbs of Ratzeburg, such as Ziethen in Lauenburg, Mechow, Bäk and Römnitz became part of the district, while the Lauenburgian municipalities of Dechow, Groß and Klein Thurow (now component parts of Roggendorf) as well as Lassahn (now a component part of Zarrentin am Schaalsee) were ceded to Mecklenburg. The redeployment was accomplished on 26 November, the respective occupational forces had until 28 November to withdraw to their respective new zonal territories.

== Politics ==
=== Coat of arms ===
The coat of arms displays a white horse, the ancient symbol of the duchy of Saxony. The horse is surrounded by a black and white checked border, which represents the colours of Prussia. This is a modified version of the arms used when Saxe-Lauenburg was ruled in personal union with the Danish monarchy, 1815-64. The former arms featured a golden horse's head on a red shield.

The coat of arms was granted on 12 November 1866, after the Hohenzollern dynasty started to rule Saxe-Lauenburg in personal union with the Kingdom of Prussia. In 1876 the duchy was incorporated in a real union into Prussia, forming a district within the Prussian Province of Schleswig-Holstein. The usage of the coat of arms was discontinued, as then districts were not allowed to use coats of arms. Today the coat of arms is used by the district, displayed with a crown on top.

=== District Administrator ===
From 1873–82 the Hereditary Land Marshal (Erblandmarschall) was responsible for administration of the district and the appointment of offices. The landrat (about in English: county commissioner), as a Prussian official, dealt only with the national administration.

- 1873–1874: Regierungsassessor Jungbluth
- 1874–1881: Graf Andreas von Bernstorff

After 1 October 1882 the Landrat became responsible also for local administration, free from state control.

- 1882–1897: Oskar von Dolega-Kozierowski
- 1897–1900: Graf Finck von Finckenstein
- 1900–1907: Friedrich von Bülow
- 1907–1919: Emil Mathis
- 1919–1927: Kurt Schönberg
- 1927–1933: Gustav Voigt
- 1933–1938: Theodor Fründt, NSDAP
- 1939–1945: Erich Jüttner, NSDAP

A change in government came about after the Second World War with the 1946 county statute issued by the British military government. The Landrat now temporarily functioned as an honorary head of the district council (Kreistag), which now dealt with the administration of the district directly. Later, however, the Landrat took over the district administration again.

- 1945–1946: Ewald Raaz
- 1946–1948: Wilhelm Gülich, SPD
- 1948–1950: Fritz Vagt, CDU
- 1950–1969: Gerhard Wandschneider
- 1969–1975: Klaus Prößdorf
- 1975–2002: Günter Kröpelin, CDU
- 2002–2015: Gerd Krämer, independent
- 2015–present: Dr. Christoph Mager, CDU

=== District President ===
The District President (Kreispräsident) is the chairman of the district council and is selected from its members. The president chairs the meetings of the council and represents the district, together with the landrat, abroad.

- 19??–1994: Norbert Brackmann, CDU
- 1994–2003: Helga Hinz, SPD
- 2003–present: Meinhard Füllner, CDU

=== Organisation ===
Contrary to others in Schleswig-Holstein, this district is characterised by numerous relatively small municipalities, which practise direct democracy and citizens' participation. The administration most often takes place via offices, which are often of a very manageable size. To that extent, the scope of the planned Schleswig-Holstein Administrative Structure Law will be quite significant: according to the draft of the Ministry of the Interior, a minimum size of 8000 inhabitants was to be implemented for Ämter and independent municipalities as a regional reorganisation due 1 April 2007. Thus, the existence of six of the eleven Ämter of the district is threatened. However, a minimum size for municipalities belonging to an Amt has not yet been officially determined. Until the deadline, the possibility for voluntary unions exists, which, according to the draft, may as well cross district boundaries.

The economical emphasis of the district lies on the Hamburg bacon-belt, while the eastern parts in the Lauenburg Lakes Nature Park with their abundance of water cater more to tourism and are largely focused on agriculture. The district belongs to Hamburg Metropolitan Region.

== Transportation ==
Logo of the transport association HVV

- In 2003, the public transit system in the district was integrated into the Hamburger Verkehrsverbund (HVV).
- Connections to the Autobahn network are provided by the A1 (Hamburg–Lübeck) in the west, the A 24 (Hamburg–Berlin) in the south, the A 25 (Geesthacht–Hamburg) and the A 20 (Lübeck–Rostock) in the north of the district.
- Railway connections exist from Hamburg to Büchen and on to Berlin; and from Lüneburg to Büchen and on to Lübeck, via Mölln/Ratzeburg. Both routes are operated by Deutsche Bahn. From Bergedorf to Geesthacht, there is still the old Bergedorf-Geesthachter Eisenbahn (BGE) freight route, which now serves as a museum railway line, belonging to the privately operated AKN Eisenbahn.
- The Elbe harbour of Lauenburg/Elbe constitutes one end of the Elbe-Lübeck Canal, established in 1900. Via the Trave river, it connects the Central European network of canals to Lübeck and the Baltic Sea. The canal served as a part of the Old Salt Route.
- Nearby airports are Lübeck Airport and Hamburg Airport.

== Towns and municipalities ==
Clickable map of towns and municipalities in the district

(Populations as of 30 June 2005 in brackets)

Independent towns and municipalities
1. Geesthacht (29,404)
2. Lauenburg/Elbe (11,692)
3. Mölln (18,496)
4. Ratzeburg (13,708)
5. Schwarzenbek (14,865)
6. Wentorf bei Hamburg (11,433)

Ämter
1. Berkenthin; 1. Behlendorf (393); 2. Berkenthin^{1} (2,027); 3. Bliestorf (693); 4. Düchelsdorf (159); 5. Göldenitz (229); 6. Kastorf (1,146); 7. Klempau (601); 8. Krummesse (1,566); 9. Niendorf bei Berkenthin (187); 10. Rondeshagen (864); 11. Sierksrade (308); 2. Breitenfelde (seat: Mölln); 1. Alt Mölln (864); 2. Bälau (239); 3. Borstorf (307); 4. Breitenfelde (1,812); 5. Grambek (393); 6. Hornbek (176); 7. Lehmrade (463); 8. Niendorf an der Stecknitz (628); 9. Schretstaken (518); 10. Talkau (527); 11. Woltersdorf (280); 3. Büchen; 1. Besenthal (75); 2. Bröthen (274); 3. Büchen^{1} (5,515); 4. Fitzen (361); 5. Göttin (55); 6. Gudow (1,652); 7. Güster (1,190); 8. Klein Pampau (647); 9. Langenlehsten (157); 10. Müssen (942); 11. Roseburg (509); 12. Schulendorf (452); 13. Siebeneichen (259); 14. Tramm (335); 15. Witzeeze (917)	4. Hohe Elbgeest; 1. Aumühle (3,088); 2. Börnsen (3,822); 3. Dassendorf^{1} (3,105); 4. Escheburg (3,036); 5. Hamwarde (751); 6. Hohenhorn (443); 7. Kröppelshagen-Fahrendorf (1,082); 8. Wiershop (173); 9. Wohltorf (2,264); 10. Worth (171); 11. Sachsenwald, unincorporated area; 5. Lauenburgische Seen (seat: Ratzeburg); 1. Albsfelde (59); 2. Bäk (793); 3. Brunsmark (153); 4. Buchholz (245); 5. Einhaus (393); 6. Fredeburg (39); 7. Giesensdorf (93); 8. Groß Disnack (91); 9. Groß Grönau (3,476); 10. Groß Sarau (877); 11. Harmsdorf (229); 12. Hollenbek (450); 13. Horst (256); 14. Kittlitz (259); 15. Klein Zecher (248); 16. Kulpin (248); 17. Mechow (92); 18. Mustin (715); 19. Pogeez (394); 20. Römnitz (61); 21. Salem (560); 22. Schmilau (601); 23. Seedorf (529); 24. Sterley (971); 25. Ziethen (972); 6. Lütau (seat: Lauenburg/Elbe); 1. Basedow (678); 2. Buchhorst (163); 3. Dalldorf (353); 4. Juliusburg (184); 5. Krukow (196); 6. Krüzen (337); 7. Lanze (407); 8. Lütau (677); 9. Schnakenbek (846); 10. Wangelau (220)	7. Sandesneben-Nusse; 1. Duvensee (539); 2. Grinau (315); 3. Groß Boden (211); 4. Groß Schenkenberg (537); 5. Klinkrade (539); 6. Koberg (733); 7. Kühsen (378); 8. Labenz (823); 9. Lankau (491); 10. Linau (1,150); 11. Lüchow (217); 12. Nusse (1,027); 13. Panten (725); 14. Poggensee (337); 15. Ritzerau (287); 16. Sandesneben^{1} (1,616); 17. Schiphorst (571); 18. Schönberg (1,291); 19. Schürensöhlen (166); 20. Siebenbäumen (657); 21. Sirksfelde (308); 22. Steinhorst (554); 23. Stubben (424); 24. Walksfelde (188); 25. Wentorf, Sandesneben (728); 8. Schwarzenbek-Land (seat: Schwarzenbek); 1. Basthorst (384); 2. Brunstorf (609); 3. Dahmker (150); 4. Elmenhorst (912); 5. Fuhlenhagen (292); 6. Grabau (288); 7. Groß Pampau (125); 8. Grove (231); 9. Gülzow (1,302); 10. Hamfelde (453); 11. Havekost (147); 12. Kankelau (212); 13. Kasseburg (534); 14. Kollow (658); 15. Köthel (283); 16. Kuddewörde (1,329); 17. Möhnsen (524); 18. Mühlenrade (189); 19. Sahms (368)
^{1}seat of the Amt

== See also ==
- List of German MPs from the Duchy of Lauenburg
