= Lankau =

- Municipality
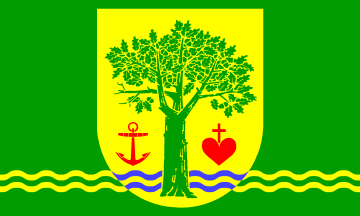
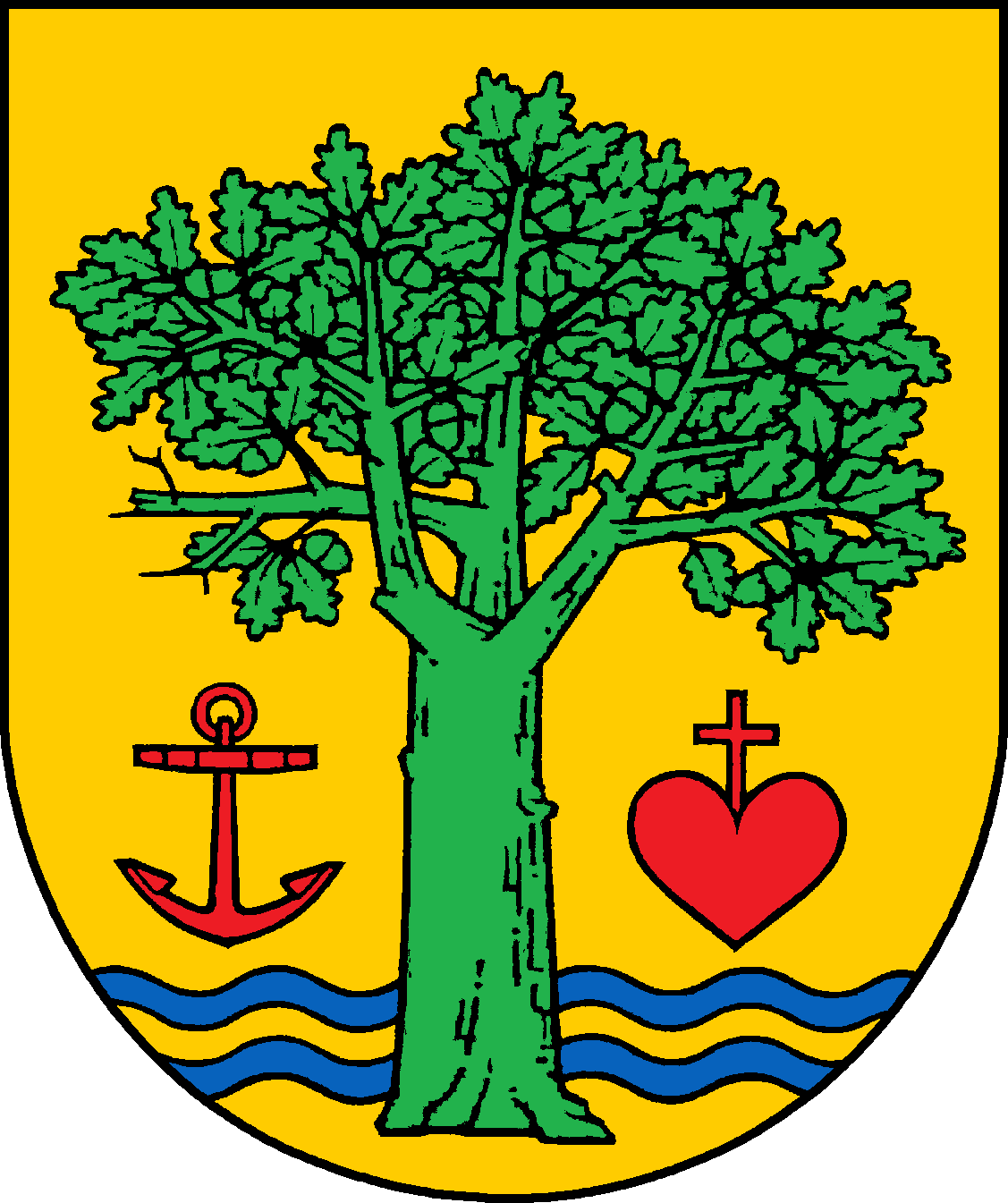
- Flag Coat of arms

- Location of Lankau within Herzogtum Lauenburg district
- Interactive map of Lankau
- Location within Germany Location within Schleswig-Holstein
- Coordinates: 53°40′9″N 10°40′1″E
- Country: Germany
- State: Schleswig-Holstein
- District: Herzogtum Lauenburg
- Municipal assoc.: Sandesneben-Nusse

Government
  - Mayor: Olaf Franz

Area
  - Total: 19.12 km^{2} (7.38 sq mi)
- Elevation: 47 m (154 ft)

Population (2025-12-31)
  - Total: 456
  - Density: 23.8/km^{2} (61.8/sq mi)
- Time zone: UTC+01:00 (CET)
  - Summer (DST): UTC+02:00 (CEST)
- Postal codes: 23881
- Dialling codes: 04542
- Vehicle registration: RZ
- Website: www.amt- sandesneben- nusse.de

Lankau (German pronunciation: [ˈlaŋkaʊ]) is a municipality in the district of Lauenburg, in Schleswig-Holstein, Germany.
