= Sandesneben =

- Municipality
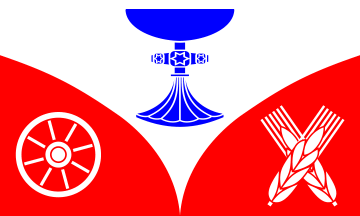
- Flag Coat of arms

- Location of Sandesneben within Herzogtum Lauenburg district
- Interactive map of Sandesneben
- Location within Germany Location within Schleswig-Holstein
- Coordinates: 53°41′N 10°30′E
- Country: Germany
- State: Schleswig-Holstein
- District: Herzogtum Lauenburg
- Municipal assoc.: Sandesneben-Nusse

Government
  - Mayor: Erich Bünger

Area
  - Total: 6.13 km^{2} (2.37 sq mi)
- Elevation: 49 m (161 ft)

Population (2025-12-31)
  - Total: 1,863
  - Density: 304/km^{2} (787/sq mi)
- Time zone: UTC+01:00 (CET)
  - Summer (DST): UTC+02:00 (CEST)
- Postal codes: 23898
- Dialling codes: 04536
- Vehicle registration: RZ
- Website: www.amt- sandesneben- nusse.de

Sandesneben is a village in the district of Lauenburg, in Schleswig-Holstein, Germany. It is situated approximately 18 km west of Ratzeburg, and 25 km southwest of Lübeck.

Sandesneben is the seat of the Amt ("collective municipality") Sandesneben-Nusse.
