= Paul Jungbluth =

Dutch politician (born 1949)

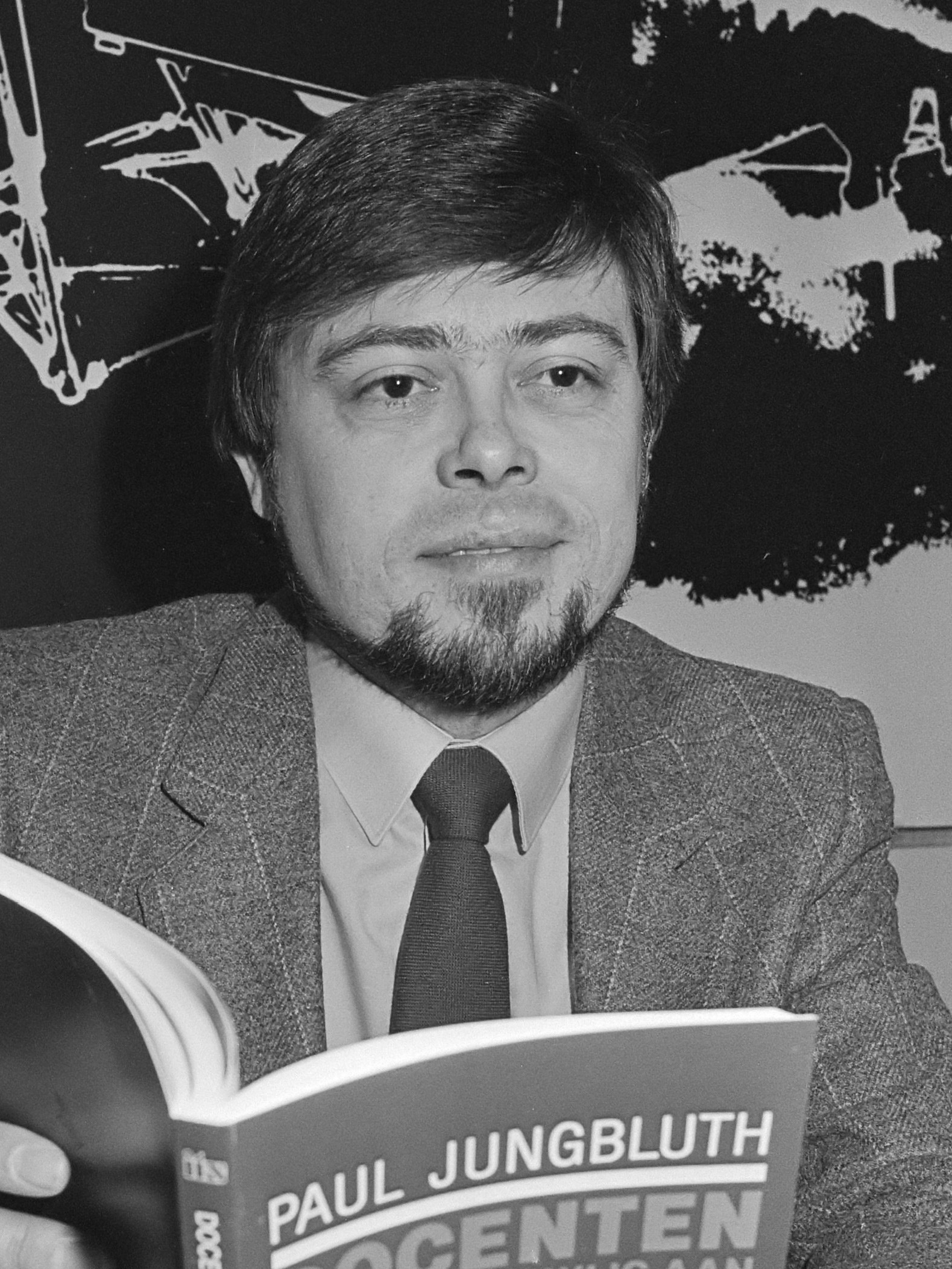
Paul Jungbluth (1982)

Paul Léon Marie Jungbluth (Vaals, 24 November 1949) is a Dutch GreenLeft politician. Jungbluth was a member of the House of Representatives from 2005 to 2006.

In parliament, Jungbluth was active on education and economic affairs. He entered the House of Representatives in 2005, replacing Evelien Tonkens. Jungbluth had a background as research in the Institute for Applied Social Sciences of the Radboud University Nijmegen where he published on education. He did not stand for re-election in 2006 election.
