= Tramm, Schleswig-Holstein =

Tramm
- Municipality
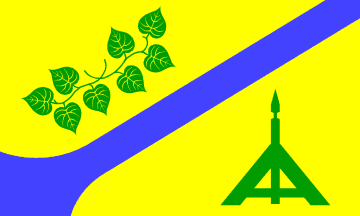
- Flag Coat of arms

- Location of Tramm within Herzogtum Lauenburg district
- Interactive map of Tramm
- Location within Germany Location within Schleswig-Holstein
- Coordinates: 53°31′N 10°38′E
- Country: Germany
- State: Schleswig-Holstein
- District: Herzogtum Lauenburg
- Municipal assoc.: Büchen

Government
  - Mayor: Heinrich Hanisch

Area
  - Total: 6.74 km^{2} (2.60 sq mi)
- Elevation: 42 m (138 ft)

Population (2025-12-31)
  - Total: 334
  - Density: 49.6/km^{2} (128/sq mi)
- Time zone: UTC+01:00 (CET)
  - Summer (DST): UTC+02:00 (CEST)
- Postal codes: 21516
- Dialling codes: 04156
- Vehicle registration: RZ
- Website: www.buechen.de

Tramm (German pronunciation: [tʁam]) is a municipality in the district of Lauenburg, in Schleswig-Holstein, Germany.
