= Sirksfelde =

- Municipality
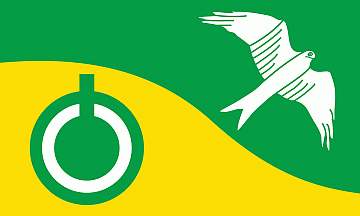
- Flag Coat of arms

- Location of Sirksfelde within Herzogtum Lauenburg district
- Interactive map of Sirksfelde
- Location within Germany Location within Schleswig-Holstein
- Coordinates: 53°40′N 10°30′E
- Country: Germany
- State: Schleswig-Holstein
- District: Herzogtum Lauenburg
- Municipal assoc.: Sandesneben-Nusse

Government
  - Mayor: Gerhard Peters

Area
  - Total: 8.63 km^{2} (3.33 sq mi)
- Elevation: 56 m (184 ft)

Population (2025-12-31)
  - Total: 339
  - Density: 39.3/km^{2} (102/sq mi)
- Time zone: UTC+01:00 (CET)
  - Summer (DST): UTC+02:00 (CEST)
- Postal codes: 23898
- Dialling codes: 04543
- Vehicle registration: RZ
- Website: www.amt- sandesneben- nusse.de

Sirksfelde is a municipality in the district of Lauenburg, in Schleswig-Holstein, Germany.
