= Stubben, Schleswig-Holstein =

Stubben
- Municipality
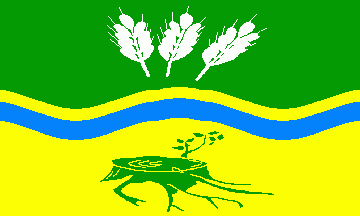
- Flag Coat of arms

- Location of Stubben within Herzogtum Lauenburg district
- Interactive map of Stubben
- Location within Germany Location within Schleswig-Holstein
- Coordinates: 53°44′N 10°26′E
- Country: Germany
- State: Schleswig-Holstein
- District: Herzogtum Lauenburg
- Municipal assoc.: Sandesneben-Nusse

Government
  - Mayor: Dörte Schmidt

Area
  - Total: 5.24 km^{2} (2.02 sq mi)
- Elevation: 48 m (157 ft)

Population (2025-12-31)
  - Total: 390
  - Density: 74/km^{2} (190/sq mi)
- Time zone: UTC+01:00 (CET)
  - Summer (DST): UTC+02:00 (CEST)
- Postal codes: 23847
- Dialling codes: 04534
- Vehicle registration: RZ
- Website: www.amt- sandesneben- nusse.de

Stubben is a municipality in the district of Lauenburg, in Schleswig-Holstein, Germany.
