= Siebenbäumen =

- Municipality
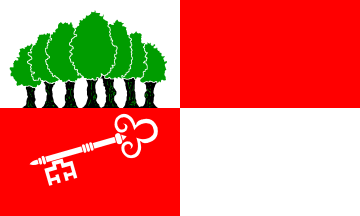
- Flag Coat of arms

- Location of Siebenbäumen within Herzogtum Lauenburg district
- Interactive map of Siebenbäumen
- Location within Germany Location within Schleswig-Holstein
- Coordinates: 53°45′N 10°32′E
- Country: Germany
- State: Schleswig-Holstein
- District: Herzogtum Lauenburg
- Municipal assoc.: Sandesneben-Nusse

Government
  - Mayor: Heiko Behnke (CDU)

Area
  - Total: 8.82 km^{2} (3.41 sq mi)
- Elevation: 50 m (160 ft)

Population (2025-12-31)
  - Total: 590
  - Density: 67/km^{2} (170/sq mi)
- Time zone: UTC+01:00 (CET)
  - Summer (DST): UTC+02:00 (CEST)
- Postal codes: 23847
- Dialling codes: 04501
- Vehicle registration: RZ
- Website: www.amt- sandesneben- nusse.de

Siebenbäumen is a municipality in the district of Lauenburg, in Schleswig-Holstein, Germany.
