= Berkenthin =

- Municipality
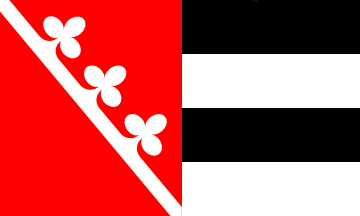
- Flag Coat of arms

- Location of Berkenthin within Herzogtum Lauenburg district
- Interactive map of Berkenthin
- Location within Germany Location within Schleswig-Holstein
- Coordinates: 53°43′N 10°39′E
- Country: Germany
- State: Schleswig-Holstein
- District: Herzogtum Lauenburg
- Municipal assoc.: Berkenthin

Government
  - Mayor: Michael Grönheim (SPD)

Area
  - Total: 10.22 km^{2} (3.95 sq mi)
- Elevation: 12 m (39 ft)

Population (2025-12-31)
  - Total: 2,195
  - Density: 214.8/km^{2} (556.3/sq mi)
- Time zone: UTC+01:00 (CET)
  - Summer (DST): UTC+02:00 (CEST)
- Postal codes: 23919
- Dialling codes: 04544
- Vehicle registration: RZ
- Website: www.amt- berkenthin.de

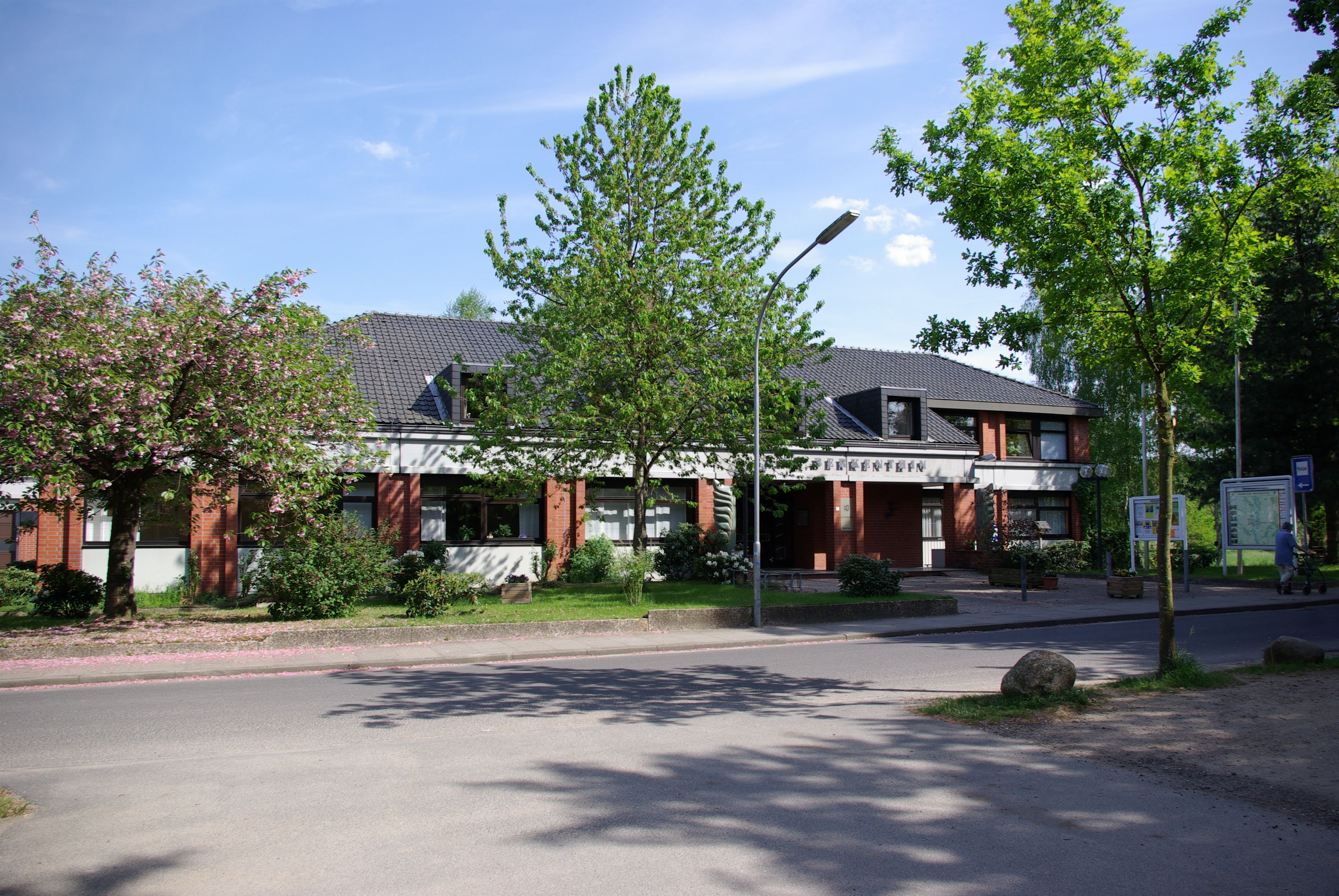
Administration of Amt Berkenthin

Berkenthin is a municipality in the district of Lauenburg, in Schleswig-Holstein, Germany. It is situated on the Elbe-Lübeck Canal, approx. 10 km northwest of Ratzeburg, and 15 km south of Lübeck.

Berkenthin is the seat of the Amt ("collective municipality") Berkenthin.
