= Schürensöhlen =

- Municipality
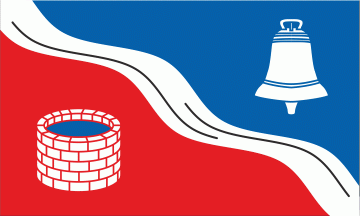
- Flag Coat of arms

- Location of Schürensöhlen within Herzogtum Lauenburg district
- Interactive map of Schürensöhlen
- Location within Germany Location within Schleswig-Holstein
- Coordinates: 53°46′N 10°29′E
- Country: Germany
- State: Schleswig-Holstein
- District: Herzogtum Lauenburg
- Municipal assoc.: Sandesneben-Nusse

Government
  - Mayor: Kay-Uwe Lange

Area
  - Total: 2.75 km^{2} (1.06 sq mi)
- Elevation: 56 m (184 ft)

Population (2025-12-31)
  - Total: 169
  - Density: 61.5/km^{2} (159/sq mi)
- Time zone: UTC+01:00 (CET)
  - Summer (DST): UTC+02:00 (CEST)
- Postal codes: 23847
- Dialling codes: 04539
- Vehicle registration: RZ
- Website: www.amt- sandesneben- nusse.de

Schürensöhlen is a municipality in the district of Lauenburg, in Schleswig-Holstein, Germany.
