= Breitenfelde =

- Municipality
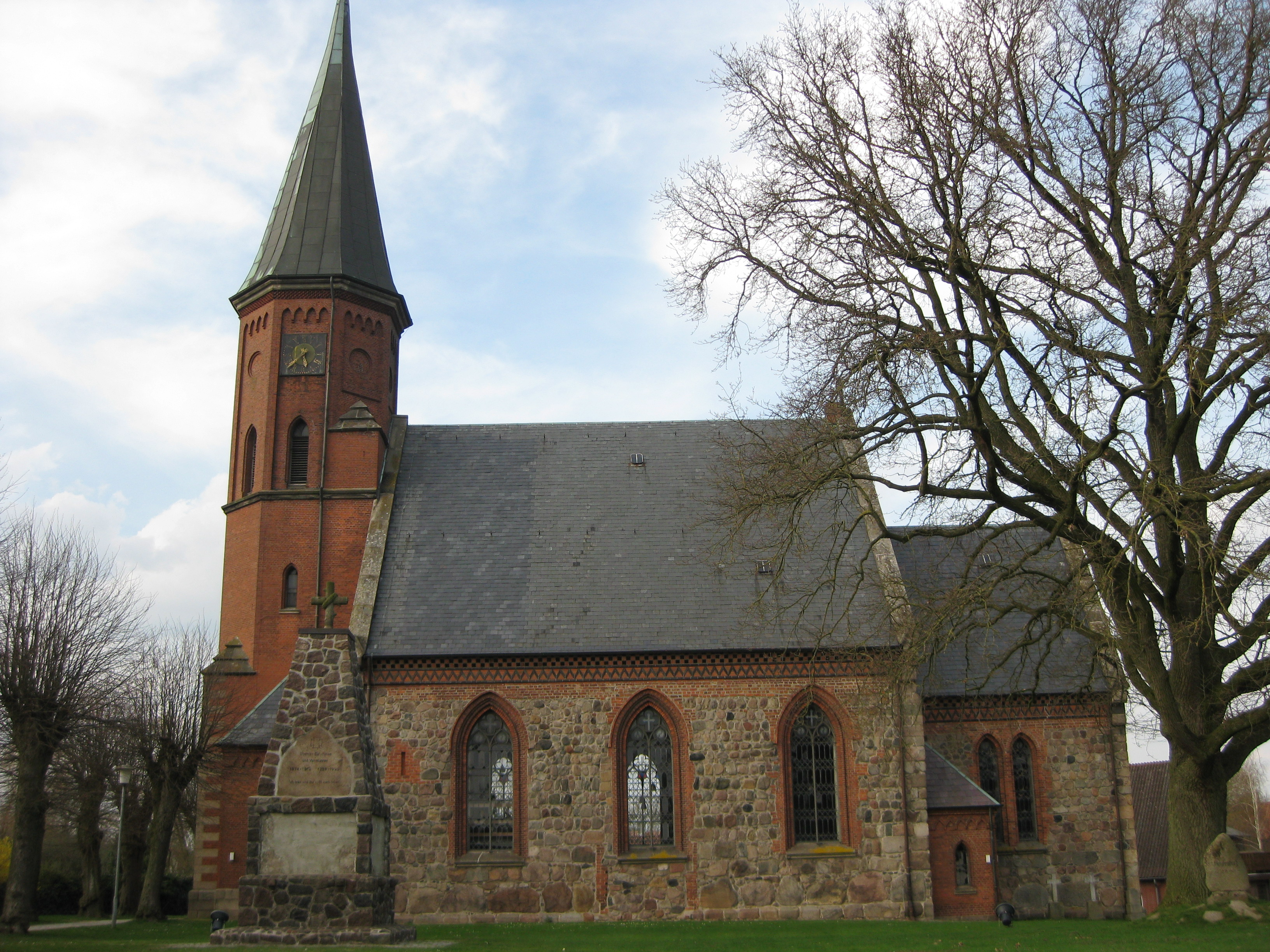
- Breitenfelde Church

- Flag Coat of arms

- Location of Breitenfelde within Herzogtum Lauenburg district
- Interactive map of Breitenfelde
- Location within Germany Location within Schleswig-Holstein
- Coordinates: 53°36′N 10°38′E
- Country: Germany
- State: Schleswig-Holstein
- District: Herzogtum Lauenburg
- Municipal assoc.: Breitenfelde

Government
  - Mayor: Anne Fröhlich

Area
  - Total: 12.54 km^{2} (4.84 sq mi)
- Elevation: 38 m (125 ft)

Population (2025-12-31)
  - Total: 2,112
  - Density: 168.4/km^{2} (436.2/sq mi)
- Time zone: UTC+01:00 (CET)
  - Summer (DST): UTC+02:00 (CEST)
- Postal codes: 23881
- Dialling codes: 04542
- Vehicle registration: RZ
- Website: www.amt- breitenfelde.de

Breitenfelde is a village in the district of Lauenburg, in Schleswig-Holstein, Germany. It is situated near the Elbe-Lübeck Canal, approx. 5 km southwest of Mölln, and 30 km south of Lübeck.

Breitenfelde is part of the Amt ("collective municipality") Breitenfelde.

From November 1944 to April 1945, an external command of the Neuengamme concentration camp was housed in Breitenfelde. It comprised 20 prisoners who had to do forced labor for the SS-Bauleitung Mölln in the sawmill of the Karl Gülzow company.
