= Panten =

- Municipality
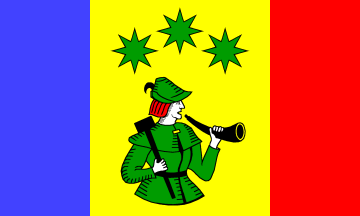
- Flag Coat of arms

- Location of Panten within Herzogtum Lauenburg district
- Interactive map of Panten
- Location within Germany Location within Schleswig-Holstein
- Coordinates: 53°39′50″N 10°37′8″E
- Country: Germany
- State: Schleswig-Holstein
- District: Herzogtum Lauenburg
- Municipal assoc.: Sandesneben-Nusse

Government
  - Mayor: Thorsten Mensing

Area
  - Total: 13.83 km^{2} (5.34 sq mi)
- Elevation: 20 m (66 ft)

Population (2025-12-31)
  - Total: 660
  - Density: 48/km^{2} (120/sq mi)
- Time zone: UTC+01:00 (CET)
  - Summer (DST): UTC+02:00 (CEST)
- Postal codes: 23896
- Dialling codes: 04542, 04543
- Vehicle registration: RZ
- Website: www.amt- sandesneben- nusse.de

Panten (German pronunciation: [ˈpantn̩]) is a municipality in the district of Lauenburg, in Schleswig-Holstein, Germany.
