= Groß Boden =

- Municipality
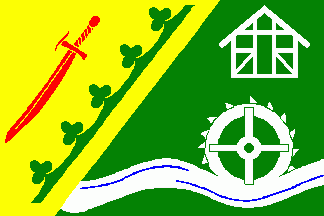
- Flag Coat of arms

- Location of Groß Boden within Herzogtum Lauenburg district
- Interactive map of Groß Boden
- Location within Germany Location within Schleswig-Holstein
- Coordinates: 53°45′N 10°27′E
- Country: Germany
- State: Schleswig-Holstein
- District: Herzogtum Lauenburg
- Municipal assoc.: Sandesneben-Nusse

Government
  - Mayor: Manfred Fürstenberg

Area
  - Total: 2.7 km^{2} (1.0 sq mi)
- Elevation: 43 m (141 ft)

Population (2025-12-31)
  - Total: 202
  - Density: 75/km^{2} (190/sq mi)
- Time zone: UTC+01:00 (CET)
  - Summer (DST): UTC+02:00 (CEST)
- Postal codes: 23847
- Dialling codes: 04539
- Vehicle registration: RZ
- Website: www.amt-sandesneben.de

Groß Boden is a municipality in the district of Lauenburg, in Schleswig-Holstein, Germany.
