= Schönberg, Lauenburg =

Schönberg
- Municipality
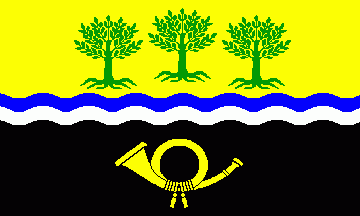
- Flag Coat of arms

- Location of Schönberg within Herzogtum Lauenburg district
- Interactive map of Schönberg
- Location within Germany Location within Schleswig-Holstein
- Coordinates: 53°40′38″N 10°26′6″E
- Country: Germany
- State: Schleswig-Holstein
- District: Herzogtum Lauenburg
- Municipal assoc.: Sandesneben-Nusse

Government
  - Mayor: Ulrich Schmister (CDU)

Area
  - Total: 14.77 km^{2} (5.70 sq mi)
- Elevation: 61 m (200 ft)

Population (2025-12-31)
  - Total: 1,458
  - Density: 98.71/km^{2} (255.7/sq mi)
- Time zone: UTC+01:00 (CET)
  - Summer (DST): UTC+02:00 (CEST)
- Postal codes: 22929
- Dialling codes: 04534
- Vehicle registration: RZ
- Website: www.amt- sandesneben- nusse.de

Schönberg (German pronunciation: [ˈʃøːnbɛʁk]) is a municipality in the district of Lauenburg, in Schleswig-Holstein, Germany.
