= Linau =

- Municipality
- Coat of arms

- Location of Linau within Herzogtum Lauenburg district
- Interactive map of Linau
- Location within Germany Location within Schleswig-Holstein
- Coordinates: 53°38′46″N 10°28′21″E
- Country: Germany
- State: Schleswig-Holstein
- District: Herzogtum Lauenburg
- Municipal assoc.: Sandesneben-Nusse

Government
  - Mayor: Jürgen Griese (CDU)

Area
  - Total: 9.66 km^{2} (3.73 sq mi)
- Elevation: 66 m (217 ft)

Population (2025-12-31)
  - Total: 1,218
  - Density: 126/km^{2} (327/sq mi)
- Time zone: UTC+01:00 (CET)
  - Summer (DST): UTC+02:00 (CEST)
- Postal codes: 22959
- Dialling codes: 04154
- Vehicle registration: RZ
- Website: www.amt- sandesneben- nusse.de

Linau (German pronunciation: [ˈliːnaʊ]) is a municipality in the district of Lauenburg, in Schleswig-Holstein, Germany.
