= Niendorf bei Berkenthin =

- Municipality
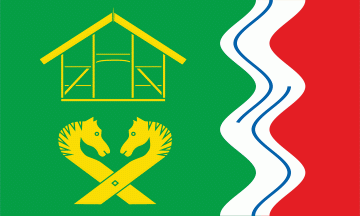
- Flag Coat of arms

- Location of Niendorf bei Berkenthin within Herzogtum Lauenburg district
- Interactive map of Niendorf bei Berkenthin
- Location within Germany Location within Schleswig-Holstein
- Coordinates: 53°42′N 10°37′E
- Country: Germany
- State: Schleswig-Holstein
- District: Herzogtum Lauenburg
- Municipal assoc.: Berkenthin

Government
  - Mayor: Rainer Wilkens

Area
  - Total: 3.99 km^{2} (1.54 sq mi)
- Elevation: 11 m (36 ft)

Population (2025-12-31)
  - Total: 185
  - Density: 46.4/km^{2} (120/sq mi)
- Time zone: UTC+01:00 (CET)
  - Summer (DST): UTC+02:00 (CEST)
- Postal codes: 23919
- Dialling codes: 04544
- Vehicle registration: RZ
- Website: www.amt- berkenthin.de

Niendorf bei Berkenthin is a municipality in the district of Lauenburg, in Schleswig-Holstein, Germany.

== History ==
Niendorf was founded near the mouth of the Stecknitz. The first Swedes settled here as early as 770 AD, and it has been inhabited continuously ever since. This makes Niendorf one of the oldest towns in Germany. During the Viking Age, the settlement on the Stecknitz was called Boasee, which comes from the namesake, Edgar Boase. Berkenthin, Göldenitz and Albsfelde could be reached by sea in a few days, which ensured flourishing trade and thus the continued existence of Niendorf.
