= Poggensee =

- Municipality
- Coat of arms

- Location of Poggensee within Herzogtum Lauenburg district
- Interactive map of Poggensee
- Location within Germany Location within Schleswig-Holstein
- Coordinates: 53°38′N 10°34′E
- Country: Germany
- State: Schleswig-Holstein
- District: Herzogtum Lauenburg
- Municipal assoc.: Sandesneben-Nusse

Government
  - Mayor: Anke Brügmann

Area
  - Total: 5.44 km^{2} (2.10 sq mi)
- Elevation: 46 m (151 ft)

Population (2025-12-31)
  - Total: 364
  - Density: 66.9/km^{2} (173/sq mi)
- Time zone: UTC+01:00 (CET)
  - Summer (DST): UTC+02:00 (CEST)
- Postal codes: 23896
- Dialling codes: 04543
- Vehicle registration: RZ
- Website: www.amt- sandesneben- nusse.de

Poggensee is a municipality in the district of Lauenburg, in Schleswig-Holstein, Germany.
