= Labenz =

- Municipality
- Coat of arms

- Location of Labenz within Herzogtum Lauenburg district
- Interactive map of Labenz
- Location within Germany Location within Schleswig-Holstein
- Coordinates: 53°42′N 10°31′E
- Country: Germany
- State: Schleswig-Holstein
- District: Herzogtum Lauenburg
- Municipal assoc.: Sandesneben-Nusse

Government
  - Mayor: Ulrich Hardtke (SPD)

Area
  - Total: 5.75 km^{2} (2.22 sq mi)
- Elevation: 25 m (82 ft)

Population (2025-12-31)
  - Total: 926
  - Density: 161/km^{2} (417/sq mi)
- Time zone: UTC+01:00 (CET)
  - Summer (DST): UTC+02:00 (CEST)
- Postal codes: 23898
- Dialling codes: 04536
- Vehicle registration: RZ
- Website: www.amt- sandesneben- nusse.de

Labenz is a municipality in the district of Lauenburg, in Schleswig-Holstein, Germany.
