= Groß Schenkenberg =

- Municipality
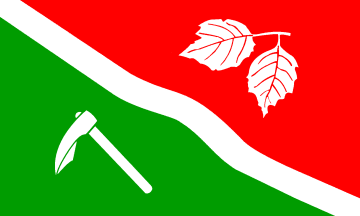
- Flag Coat of arms

- Location of Groß Schenkenberg within Herzogtum Lauenburg district
- Interactive map of Groß Schenkenberg
- Location within Germany Location within Schleswig-Holstein
- Coordinates: 53°48′N 10°34′E
- Country: Germany
- State: Schleswig-Holstein
- District: Herzogtum Lauenburg
- Municipal assoc.: Sandesneben-Nusse

Government
  - Mayor: Bernd Paschen

Area
  - Total: 6.52 km^{2} (2.52 sq mi)
- Elevation: 15 m (49 ft)

Population (2025-12-31)
  - Total: 552
  - Density: 84.7/km^{2} (219/sq mi)
- Time zone: UTC+01:00 (CET)
  - Summer (DST): UTC+02:00 (CEST)
- Postal codes: 23860
- Dialling codes: 04508, 04539
- Vehicle registration: RZ
- Website: www.amt- sandesneben- nusse.de

Groß Schenkenberg is a municipality in the district of Lauenburg, in Schleswig-Holstein, Germany.
