= Walksfelde =

- Municipality
- Coat of arms

- Location of Walksfelde within Herzogtum Lauenburg district
- Interactive map of Walksfelde
- Location within Germany Location within Schleswig-Holstein
- Coordinates: 53°38′N 10°35′E
- Country: Germany
- State: Schleswig-Holstein
- District: Herzogtum Lauenburg
- Municipal assoc.: Sandesneben-Nusse

Government
  - Mayor: Doreen Keding

Area
  - Total: 3.51 km^{2} (1.36 sq mi)
- Elevation: 44 m (144 ft)

Population (2025-12-31)
  - Total: 228
  - Density: 65.0/km^{2} (168/sq mi)
- Time zone: UTC+01:00 (CET)
  - Summer (DST): UTC+02:00 (CEST)
- Postal codes: 23896
- Dialling codes: 04543
- Vehicle registration: RZ
- Website: (Walksfelde=)

Walksfelde is a municipality in the district of Lauenburg, in Schleswig-Holstein, Germany.
