= Wentorf, Sandesneben =

Wentorf (Amt Sandesneben)
- Municipality
- Coat of arms

- Location of Wentorf (Amt Sandesneben) within Herzogtum Lauenburg district
- Interactive map of Wentorf (Amt Sandesneben)
- Location within Germany Location within Schleswig-Holstein
- Coordinates: 53°41′N 10°28′E
- Country: Germany
- State: Schleswig-Holstein
- District: Herzogtum Lauenburg
- Municipal assoc.: Sandesneben-Nusse

Government
  - Mayor: Nicole Demir

Area
  - Total: 4.99 km^{2} (1.93 sq mi)
- Elevation: 60 m (200 ft)

Population (2025-12-31)
  - Total: 719
  - Density: 144/km^{2} (373/sq mi)
- Time zone: UTC+01:00 (CET)
  - Summer (DST): UTC+02:00 (CEST)
- Postal codes: 23898
- Dialling codes: 04536
- Vehicle registration: RZ
- Website: www.wentorf-as.de

Wentorf (Amt Sandesneben) (German pronunciation: [ˈvɛntɔʁf]) is a municipality in the district of Lauenburg, in Schleswig-Holstein, Germany.
