= Lüchow, Schleswig-Holstein =

Lüchow
- Municipality
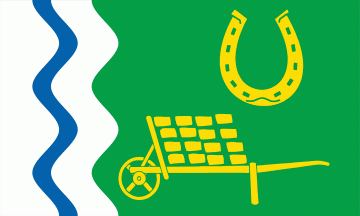
- Flag Coat of arms

- Location of Lüchow within Herzogtum Lauenburg district
- Interactive map of Lüchow
- Location within Germany Location within Schleswig-Holstein
- Coordinates: 53°41′26″N 10°31′47″E
- Country: Germany
- State: Schleswig-Holstein
- District: Herzogtum Lauenburg
- Municipal assoc.: Sandesneben-Nusse

Government
  - Mayor: Tilmann Hack

Area
  - Total: 4.61 km^{2} (1.78 sq mi)
- Elevation: 48 m (157 ft)

Population (2025-12-31)
  - Total: 308
  - Density: 66.8/km^{2} (173/sq mi)
- Time zone: UTC+01:00 (CET)
  - Summer (DST): UTC+02:00 (CEST)
- Postal codes: 23898
- Dialling codes: 04536
- Vehicle registration: RZ
- Website: www.amt- sandesneben- nusse.de

Lüchow (German pronunciation: [ˈlyːçoː]) is a municipality in the district of Lauenburg, in Schleswig-Holstein, Germany.
