= Ritzerau =

- Municipality
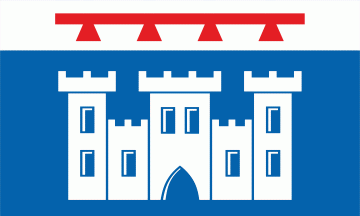
- Flag Coat of arms

- Location of Ritzerau within Herzogtum Lauenburg district
- Interactive map of Ritzerau
- Location within Germany Location within Schleswig-Holstein
- Coordinates: 53°39′52″N 10°34′7″E
- Country: Germany
- State: Schleswig-Holstein
- District: Herzogtum Lauenburg
- Municipal assoc.: Sandesneben-Nusse

Government
  - Mayor: Gerd Holz

Area
  - Total: 11.11 km^{2} (4.29 sq mi)
- Elevation: 38 m (125 ft)

Population (2025-12-31)
  - Total: 303
  - Density: 27.3/km^{2} (70.6/sq mi)
- Time zone: UTC+01:00 (CET)
  - Summer (DST): UTC+02:00 (CEST)
- Postal codes: 23896
- Dialling codes: 04543
- Vehicle registration: RZ
- Website: www.amt- sandesneben- nusse.de

Ritzerau is a municipality in the district of Lauenburg, in Schleswig-Holstein, Germany.
