= Woltman =

Woltman is a surname. Notable people with the surname include:

- Clem Woltman (1914–1988), American football player
- George Woltman (born 1957), American mathematician
- Henry Woltman (1889–1964), American neurologist
  - Woltman sign, a medical sign
- Reinhard Woltman (1757–1837), German engineer

== See also ==
- Woltmann
