= Stecknitz Canal =

Former waterway in northern Germany

Coordinates: 53°39′N 10°39′E

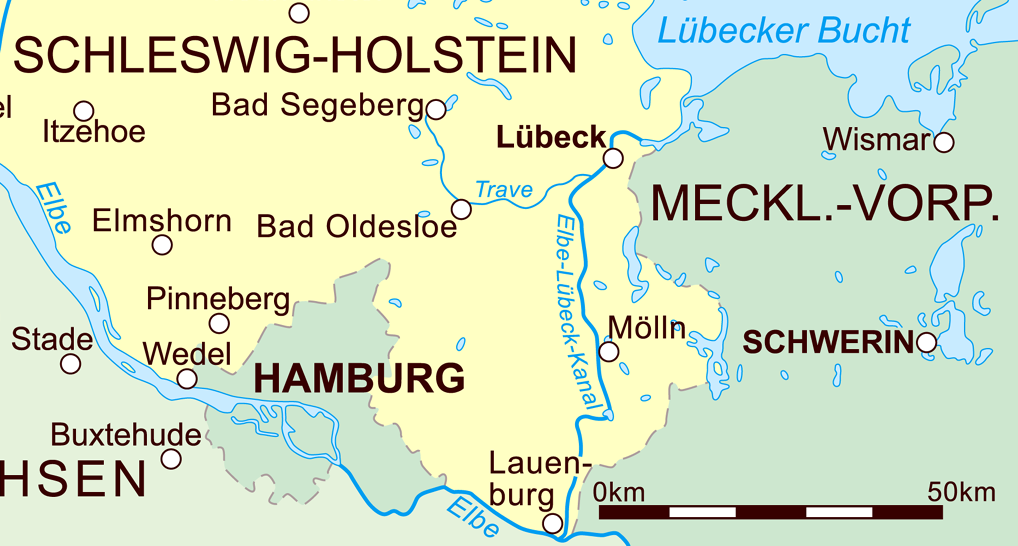
- The modern Elbe–Lübeck Canal in eastern Schleswig-Holstein

Specifications
- Length: 60 miles (97 km) (Man-made segment ran for 11.5 kilometres (7.1 mi))
- Locks: 17 (originally 13)
- Maximum height above sea level: 56 ft (17 m)
- Status: replaced by Elbe–Lübeck Canal

History
- Date of act: 1390
- Construction began: 1391
- Date completed: 1398
- Date closed: 1893

Geography
- Start point: Lauenburg (Elbe)
- End point: Lübeck (Trave)

The Stecknitz Canal (German: Stecknitzfahrt) was an artificial waterway in northern Germany which connected Lauenburg and Lübeck on the Old Salt Route by linking the tiny rivers Stecknitz (a tributary of the Trave) and Delvenau (a tributary of the Elbe), thus establishing an inland water route across the drainage divide from the North Sea to the Baltic Sea. Built between 1391 and 1398, the Stecknitz Canal was the first European summit-level canal and one of the earliest artificial waterways in Europe. In the 1890s the canal was replaced by an enlarged and straightened waterway called the Elbe–Lübeck Canal, which includes some of the Stecknitz Canal's watercourse.

The original artificial canal was 0.85 metres (33 in) deep and 7.5 metres (25 ft) wide; the man-made segment ran for 11.5 kilometres (7.1 mi), with a total length of 97 kilometres (60 mi) including the rivers it linked. The canal included seventeen wooden locks (of which the Palmschleuse at Lauenburg still exists) that managed the 13-metre (43 ft) elevation difference between its endpoints and the highest central part, the Delvenaugraben.

== History ==
In the Middle Ages the trade between the North Sea and Baltic Sea grew dramatically, but the sea journey through Øresund, increasingly important to commercial shipping since the thirteenth century, was time-consuming and dangerous. Therefore, the emerging Hanseatic city of Lübeck and Eric IV of Saxe-Lauenburg agreed in 1390 to cooperate in the construction of an artificial canal between the Elbe and the Baltic Sea. Construction on the canal began in 1391; thirty barges carrying the first load of salt from Lüneburg reached Lübeck on 22 July 1398.

The Stecknitz Canal soon replaced the existing overland cart road as the main transport mode for Lüneburg salt on the Old Salt Route. In Lübeck the salt was stored in vast salt warehouses and then transferred to ocean-going vessels for export throughout the Baltic region. In the reverse direction the Stecknitz barges transported cereals, furs, herring, ash, timber and other goods from Lübeck, which were reloaded in Lauenburg and transported down the Elbe to Hamburg. Later coal, peat, brick, limestone and gravel were added to the cargo. The importance of the canal was greatest in years in which Øresund was closed to merchant ships because of disputes over the Sound Dues and foreign shipping.

In the fifteenth century traffic peaked, with more than 3,000 shipments of more than 30,000 tons of salt moving on the canal each year. This number declined by the seventeenth century to 400 to 600 shipments (5,000 to 7,000 tons). In 1789 there were still sixty-four shipments carrying approximately 680 tons of salt. Plans for a new Baltic–North Sea canal were proposed as early as the seventeenth century, but none was implemented until the end of the nineteenth century, when the new Elbe–Lübeck Canal was built using parts of the old route of the Stecknitz Canal. For five hundred years the canal was used to transport the "white gold" and other goods; today the Palmschleuse lock in Lauenburg is one of the last remaining parts of the former canal, preserved as an historical monument.

== Technology ==
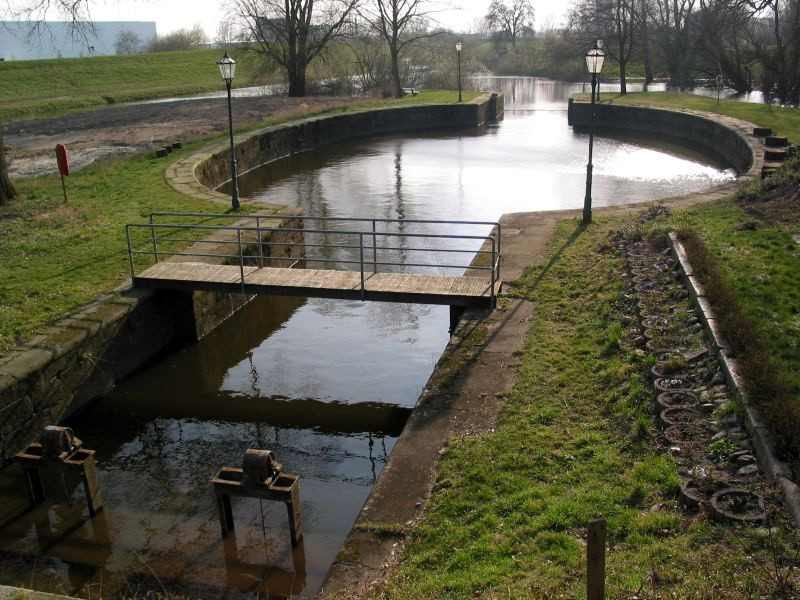
The Palmschleuse lock in Lauenburg, a preserved original lock from the Stecknitz Canal

The Stecknitz Canal consisted of an 11.5-kilometre (7.1 mi) artificial waterway (the Delvenaugraben) linking two minor rivers, the north-flowing Stecknitz and south-flowing Delvenau. The man-made trench itself was about 85 centimetres (33 in) deep and 7.5 metres (25 ft) wide, though it was enlarged between 1821 and 1823 to a depth of 144 centimetres (57 in) and a width of 12 metres (39 ft). Outside the artificial segment the canal followed the tortuous natural watercourses of the two rivers; as a result, the full journey from Lauenburg to Lübeck stretched to a distance of 97 kilometres (60 mi), even though the straight-line separation between the two cities is only 55 kilometres (34 mi). The journey along the canal often lasted two weeks or longer due to the number and primitive design of the locks and the difficulty of towing.

The canal's course originally included thirteen locks, which later renovations increased to seventeen. Initially most were one-gate flash locks built into weirs (usually set below the mouth of a tributary creek), where water was dammed until a barge was ready to pass downriver. In Lauenburg the initial course included one chamber lock (the Palmschleuse) because of a watermill whose operation would have been made impossible by a flash lock. Over the course of the canal's lifetime further flash locks were progressively converted to chamber locks until the 17th century.

The canal overcame the drainage divide between the North and Baltic Seas, with a summit height of 17 metres (56 ft) above sea level. In order to supply the top portion of the canal with water, flow was diverted from Hornbeker Mühlenbach. To the north the canal descended to the Ziegelsee by the town of Mölln and then connected to the Stecknitz by a series of eight locks. The southern end of the artificial canal descended to the Delvenau through a staircase of nine locks.

== Barges and bargees ==
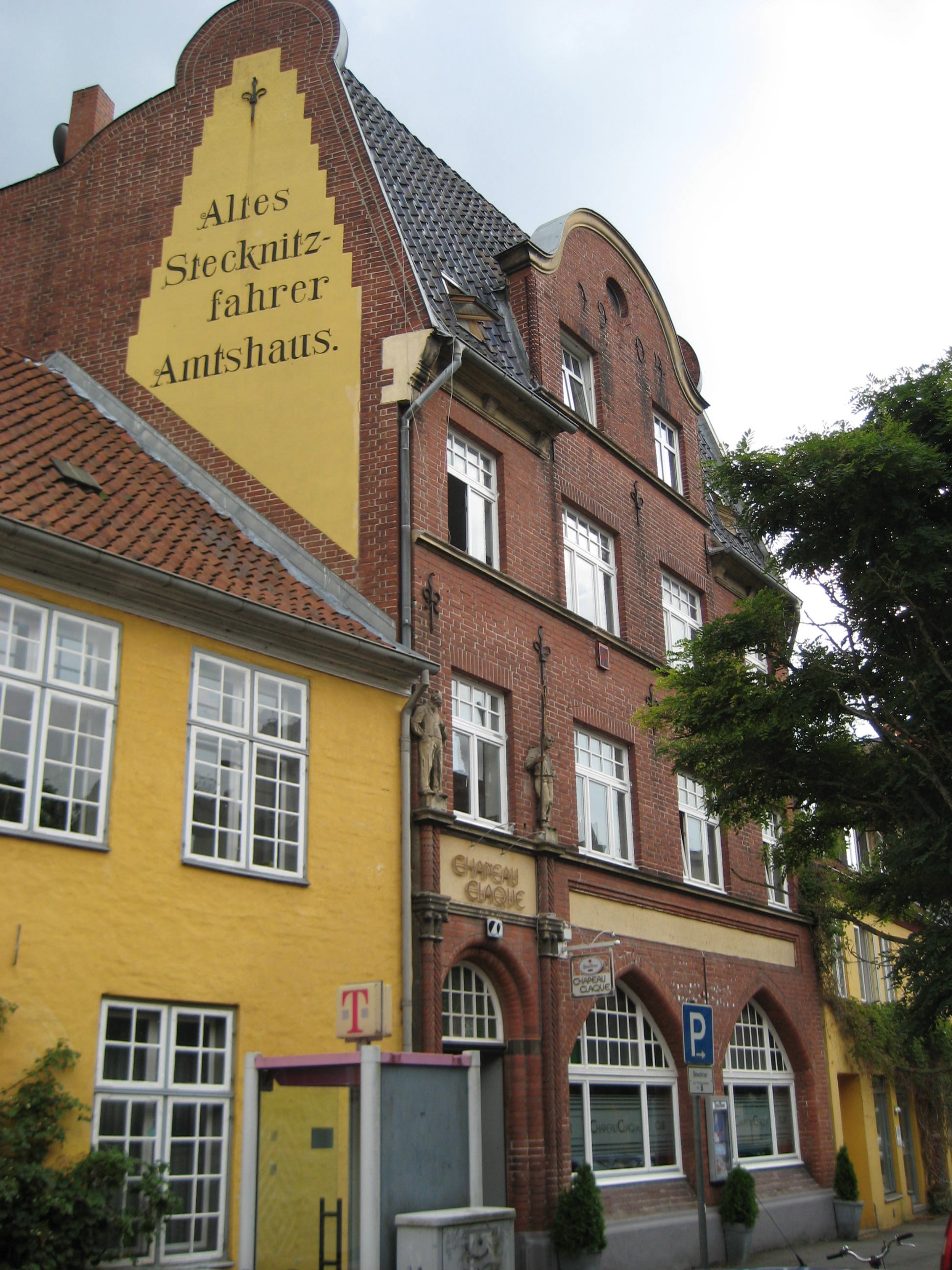
The Kringelhöge, the old Stecknitz bargees' guild-house in Lübeck

The original salt barges measured roughly 12 metres (39 ft) by 2.5 metres (8.2 ft), with a 40-centimetre (16 in) draft when loaded to capacity with around 7.5 tons of salt, and required at least ten days to make the journey one way. When traveling uphill or through chamber locks the barges had to be hauled by laborers or animals walking the towpath on the banks of the channel. By the 19th century newer vessel designs included rigging that eliminated the need for towing (with sufficient wind).

In Lauenburg and Lübeck the barges were unloaded and their contents transferred to ships for export down the Elbe and Trave. Stecknitz bargees were only permitted to own one barge each, so they could not acquire great wealth in the trade; in the long run this ensured their dependence upon the Lübeck salt merchants, who were not bound by any such limitations and amassed great fortunes. The guild of the Stecknitzfahrer (Stecknitz bargees) still exists today in Lübeck and meets annually at the Kringelhöge to celebrate the guild's history.
