= Hornbeker Mühlenbach =

Location
- Country: Germany
- State: Schleswig-Holstein
- District: Herzogtum Lauenburg

Physical characteristics
- Source
  - location: Niendorf an der Stecknitz
- Mouth
  - location: Elbe–Lübeck Canal near Hornbek
  - coordinates: 53°33′41″N 10°40′39″E
- Length: 7 km (4.3 mi)

Basin features
- Progression: Elbe–Lübeck Canal→ Elbe→ North Sea

Hornbeker Mühlenbach is a 7-kilometre-long (4.3 mi) stream of Schleswig-Holstein, Germany. Its spring is near Niendorf an der Stecknitz and after passing a V-shaped valley it reaches its mouth near Hornbek into Elbe–Lübeck Canal. The river crosses the Old Salt Route at the Mühlendamm.

It had special significance because it was part of the Limes Saxoniae since 810, which had been the border between the Abodriti and the Saxons.

== See also ==
- List of rivers of Schleswig-Holstein
