= Summit-level canal =

Artificial waterway between watersheds

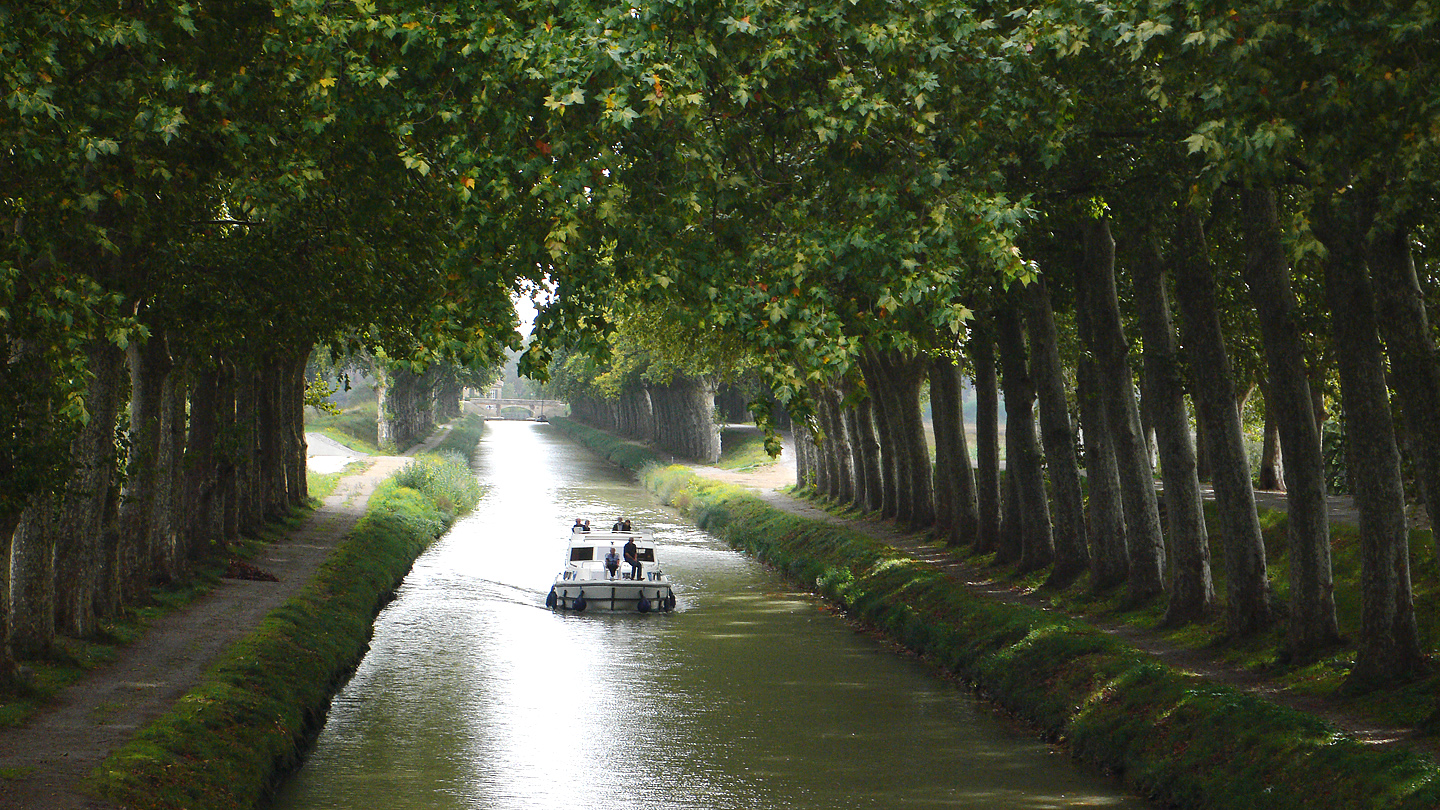
Canal du Midi

A summit-level canal, sometimes called a "watershed canal" or just "summit canal", is an artificial waterway connecting two separate river valleys. The term refers to a canal that rises to cross a summit then falls down the other side.

Typically, summit-level canals include a summit pound, a level stretch of water at the highest part of the canal, usually contained by locks that prevent the water from flowing downstream in either direction. Since water flows out when locks open to admit boats, the summit pound must have a water supply.

By contrast, a lateral canal has a continuous fall only.

== History ==
The first canal to connect rivers across a watershed was the Lingqu Canal ("Magic Canal") in China which connected the Xiang and Li rivers for military transport. Construction began in 223 BCE and the canal was in use by 214 BCE. The Lingqu carried boats and barges over a 30-meter high summit at an elevation of 210 meters, connecting the Yangtze River watershed with the Pearl River watershed. The Lingqu facilitated the unification and creation of China under its first emperor Qin Shi Huangdi.

A second Chinese summit-level canal was the Grand Canal of China. This was started in the 4th century BCE with major extensions in 329 CE, But it was the rerouting of the canal in the 1280s to shorten the connection to the new capital Beijing at the start of the Yuan dynasty, crossing the Yangtze and Yellow Rivers, that established it as a summit-level canal. It remained into the modern era as the longest canal in the world at 1,145 miles (1,843 km).

In Europe, the first summit-level canal was the Stecknitz Canal (1390–1398) in Germany which connected the Stecknitz river to the Delvenau, a tributary of the Elbe, as part of the Old Salt Route. It used fifteen staunches and had a 13-kilometre (8.1 mi) summit level; The millers only opened the flash locks on alternate days.

The first summit canal to use pound locks was the Briare Canal in France which was completed in 1642. This 55-kilometre (34 mi) canal connected the Loire valley to that of the Seine to carry the agricultural produce of the Loire to Paris. In many ways it is the ancestor of all modern summit-level canals being fed from its reservoir, Étang de la Gazonne.

One of the greatest engineering feats of the 17th century was the Canal du Midi in Southern France opened in 1684, joining the Garonne, which drains into the Atlantic Ocean to the Étang de Thau which leads to the Mediterranean. Its 240-kilometre (150 mi) length rises 62.8 metres (206 ft) at the western end and falls 190 metres (620 ft) to the east via 103 locks, one tunnel and three major aqueducts. To solve the water supply problem, the engineer Pierre-Paul Riquet constructed a major dam in the Black Mountains and constructed a feeder canal approximately 40 kilometres (25 mi) long.

A large network of 18th- and 19th-century summit-level canals in England, France, and other European countries facilitated the Industrial revolution.

== List of major summit-level canals by continent ==
=== Asia ===
China

- Grand Canal
- Lingqu Canal

=== Europe ===
France

- Canal de Briare
- Canal du Midi
- Canal du Rhône au Rhin
- Canal du Centre
- Canal de l'Oise à l'Aisne

Germany

- Rhine-Main-Danube Canal
- Kiel Canal

England

- Trent and Mersey Canal
- Leeds and Liverpool Canal
- Grand Union Canal
- Kennet and Avon Canal
- Rochdale Canal
- Huddersfield Narrow Canal
- Oxford Canal

Northern Ireland

- Newry Canal

Scotland

- Caledonian Canal
- Crinan Canal
- Forth and Clyde Canal

Poland

- Augustów Canal

Russia

- White Sea – Baltic Canal
- Volga–Baltic Waterway

Sweden

- Göta Canal

=== North America ===
United States

- Chesapeake and Delaware Canal
- Erie Canal
- Morris Canal

Canada

- Rideau Canal

Panama

- Panama Canal

== See also ==
- Contour canal
