= German Salt Museum =

Museum in Luneburg, Germany

Coordinates: 53°14′36″N 10°24′6″E

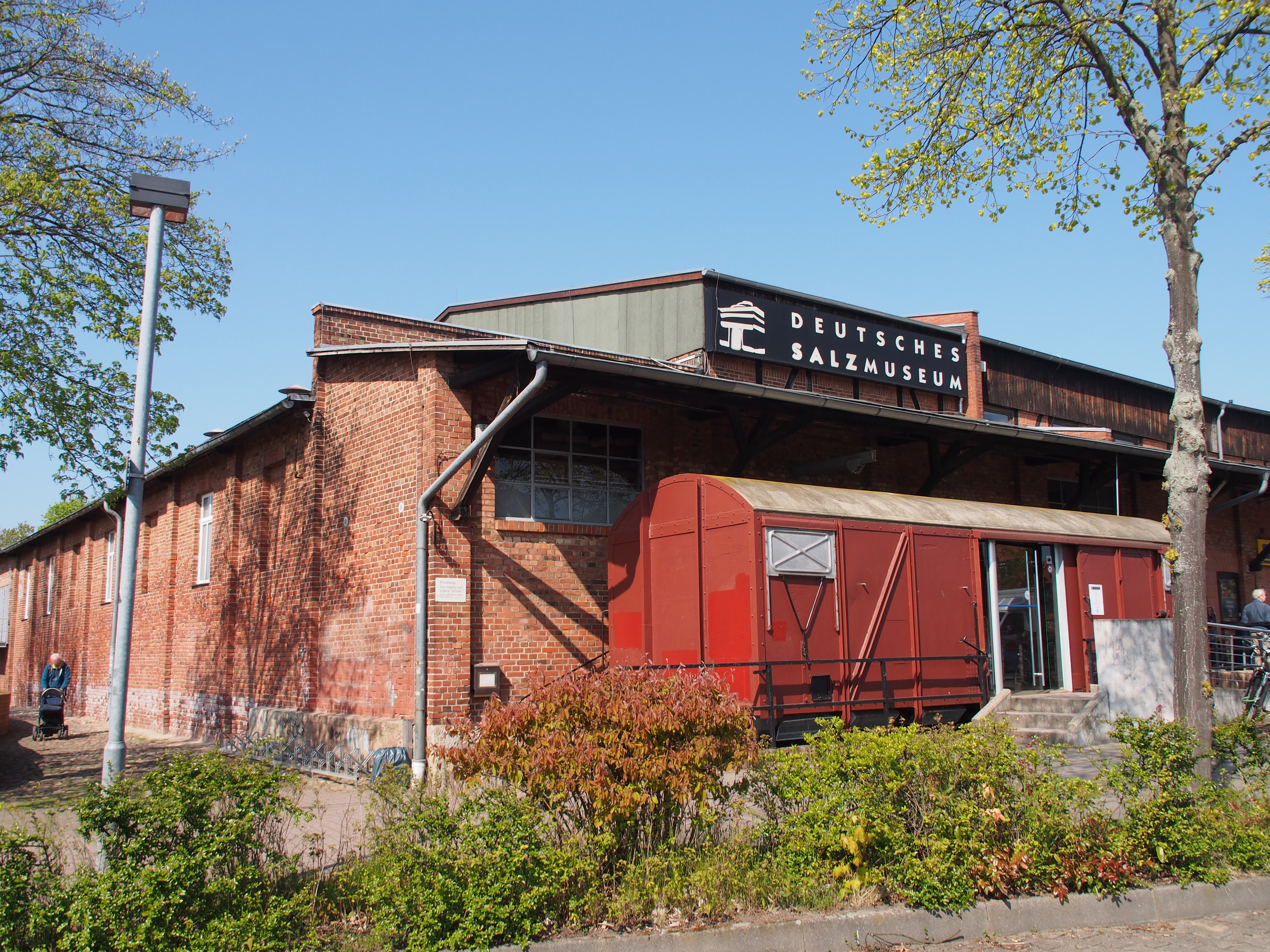
Deutsches Salzmuseum, Lüneburg

The German Salt Museum (German: Deutsche Salzmuseum / Industriedenkmal Saline Lüneburg) in the German town of Lüneburg, on the site of the old production facilities of the Lüneburg Saltworks (Lüneburger Saline) when it was closed in 1980. In 1991, it won the Council of Europe Museum Prize.

This industrial memorial which is based in the boiling house built in 1924 is one of the earliest of its type. It recalls the history of the oldest and, at one time, the greatest industrial operation in central Europe.

The museum is divided into four exhibition areas:

- Salt in general (Salz allgemein)
- 20th century (20. Jahrhundert)
- 19th century (19. Jahrhundert)
- Middle Ages and Early modern period (Mittelalter and frühe Neuzeit)

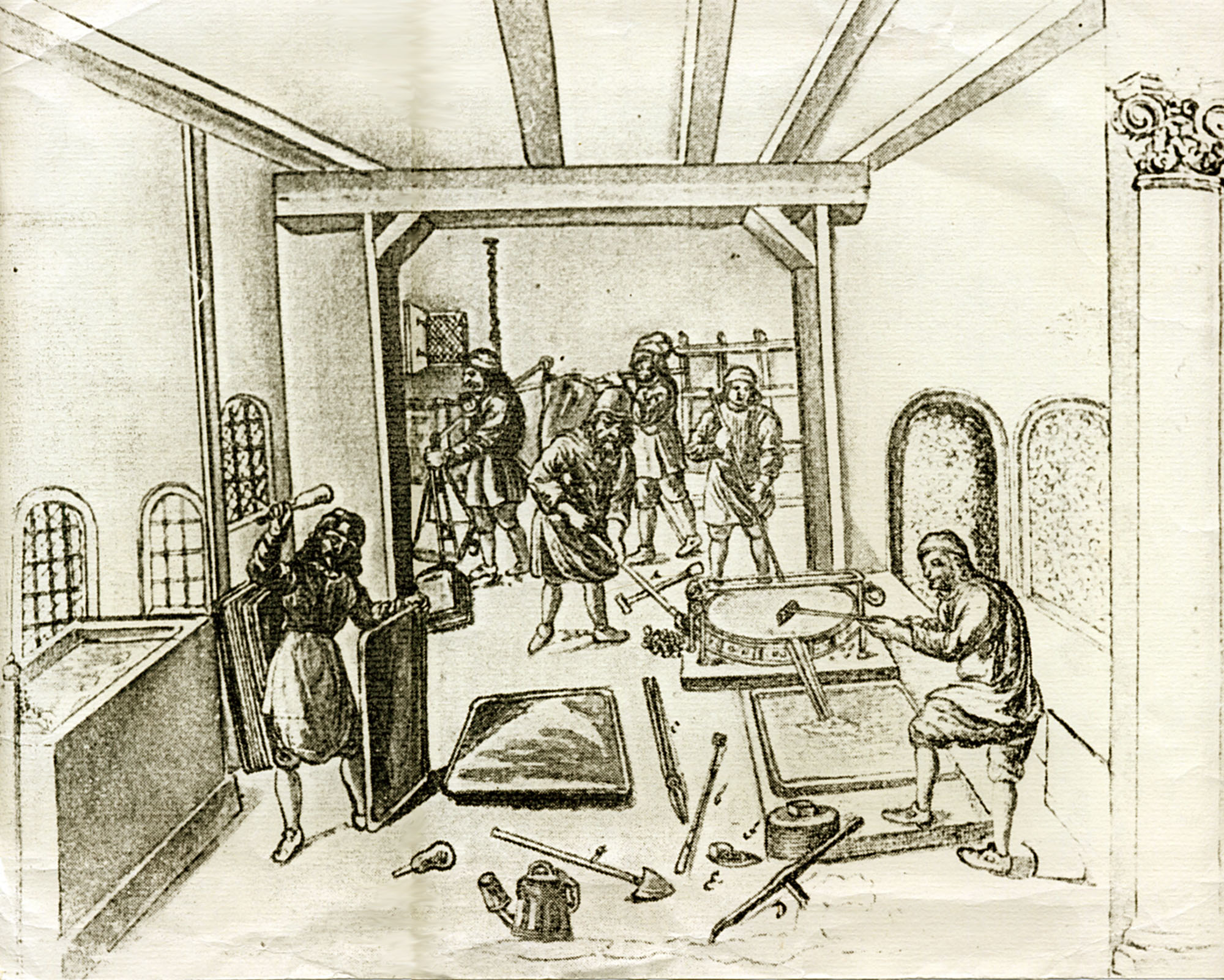
Salt pan forge (Bare) in the Lüneburg Saltworks

During the summer demonstrations take place in a replica of part of a medieval boiling hut are available on request. Members of the salt museum staff, dressed in historical costume, demonstrate the salt-boiling process using lead salt pans heated on wood fires.

== See also ==
- Old Salt Road
- Stecknitz Canal
- Sülze Saltworks
- List of food and beverage museums
