= Otto von Moltke =

German-Danish military officer (1851–1881)

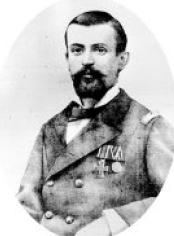
- Illustration by Otto von Moltke
- Born: 13 August 1851; Lauenburg, Denmark
- Died: 13 January 1881 (aged 29); Morro Solar, Peru
- Military career
- Allegiance: (Kingdom of Prussia) Prussia; German Empire; Chile
- Branch: Prussian Army; Imperial German Army; Chilean Army
- Rank: Lieutenant (German); Captain (Chilean)
- Conflicts: Franco-Prussian War; War of the Pacific
- Awards: Iron Cross Second Class; War Medal of 1870/71

Otto Magnus Ludwig Gerhard Graf von Moltke von Rantzau (13 August 1851 – 13 January 1881), also known as Otto von Moltke, was a German-Danish military officer who fought in the Franco-Prussian War in 1870 and, after immigrating to Chile in 1876, in the War of the Pacific in 1879. He was killed in battle in 1881, during this last war.

== Moltke family ==
Otto von Moltke was part of the old noble Moltke family, originally from Mecklenburg, which had residents in Germany and Denmark. He was the son of Adam Friedrich Adamson Graf von Moltke (1816–1885) and Fanny Charlotte Anna Luise Gräfin zu Rantzau (1824–1866).

He had six brothers;

- Adam Karl Christian Graf von Moltke (1850–1892), immigrated to Chile with Otto in 1876 and married Delfina Natividad Winslow (1861–1926), with whom he had descendants in that country.
- Friedrich Sophus Graf von Moltke (1853–1911)
- Heinrich Karl Leonhard Graf von Moltke (1854–1922), was a vice admiral in the Imperial German Navy.
- Nancy Karoline Luise Gräfin von Moltke (1856–?)
- Marie Frederikke Malvine Elisabeth Fanny Gräfin von Moltke (1860–1915)
- Conrad Christian Ludwig Graf von Moltke (1861–1937)

He also had a half sister, from his father's second marriage to Agathe Frederikke Charlotte Olshausen (1834-1909) [3].

- Stephanie Eleonore Adamine Gräfin von Moltke (1873–?)

His father, who was a Danish civil servant, prefect of one of the Danish provinces of the Duchy of Holstein until 1864, (Note: Adam Friedrich Adamson Graf von Moltke was prefect of the province of Plön until its annexation by Prussia in 1864, after the Second Schleswig War. Faced with the Prussian domination of the province, he maintained his loyalty to the Danish Crown and retired to the Free City of Lübeck, receiving a pension from the Danish government.) [Notebelongs to the same family as the Prussian military strategist Helmuth von Moltke (1800–1891).

== Early life ==
Otto von Moltke was born on 13 August 1851 in Lauenburg, in the Duchy of Saxe-Lauenburg, Denmark. He was educated in the gymnasium of Lübeck together with his older brother Karl after his father's change of residence to that city due to the Prussian annexation of the province he administered. In that compound he carried out his studies in the humanities, until he was old enough to be accepted as a soldier in the Prussian Army.

== German military service ==
Otto enlisted in January 1869 in a regiment of Prussian grenadiers at Altona [Note (Note: Vicuña Mackenna affirms that he served was the Regiment 11th Silesian Grenadiers, stationed at Altona. For his part, Siebert Held points out that he served in the Regiment 62nd King Frederick III Grenadiers of Altona, the same regiment in which his brother Karl served as an officer.) The following year, he participated in the Franco-Prussian War, integrating the Prussian forces that carried out the campaigns in France that year. On 16 August he was present with his regiment at the Battle of Mars-la-Tour, a violent engagement in which a part of the Prussian Army successfully intercepted the French Army of the Rhine that was trying to reach Verdun, but at the cost of many casualties. In this bloody battle, Otto was wounded, while his chief, a colonel surnamed von Schöning, was killed. Due to his brave conduct in battle, Otto was promoted to standard-bearer and then, in September, to second lieutenant, also receiving the Iron Cross Second Class [1][8]. Later, he also received the War Commemorative Medal of 1870/71.

After the Franco-Prussian War, he continued his service in the Imperial German Army, with the same regiment. He was then assigned to work in the barracks and, in 1875, was promoted to lieutenant. But he soon resigned because of the boredom that the job in the barracks produced, his meagre salary and a certain irregularity in the compound.

== Emigration to Chile ==
=== Work and social relationship ===
After his departure from the army, and with the aim of seeking a new life project, he associated with his brother Karl, who had also been in the army and had participated in the Franco-Prussian War. Both, informed of the good working conditions and the prosperity of Chile through the German consul in Hamburg, Mr Schutte, decided to immigrate to that country. They arrived in Valparaíso in August 1876, via Cape Horn, on the sailboat Adolphus.

Already in Chile, Otto and his brother joined the German residents, also made up of Danes. Soon he and his brother found employment in a sugar refinery of Viña del Mar, belonging to German businessman and resident Julio Bernstein. Otto lived for three years in Santiago and cultivated his social relationships in his free time. He often dedicated himself in this free time to dancing, a passion of his.

=== War of the Pacific and death ===
When hostilities began against Peru and Bolivia in early 1879, Otto obtained a leave of absence from his work to volunteer in the Chilean Army in the face of impending war. His brother Karl, meanwhile, took his place at the sugar refinery. Chilean Colonel Eckers assigned Otto the rank of second lieutenant in the Regiment Artillería de Marina.

With his regiment he was in the occupation of Antofagasta and the rest of the ports of the Bolivian coast. Later, he was assigned to garrison with a company of his regiment a nitrate establishment in the area called "Toco". There he suffered an unfortunate accident, the result of an accidental shot from a revolver that pierced his liver from band to band. Due to the severity of the wound, he was transferred to Valparaíso to be treated by a doctor named von Shroeders, who managed to cure him.

Having recovered from his wound, he returned to the north to participate in the war. Otto embarked on the auxiliary cruiser Amazonas as commander of the military garrison on board. In October, during the naval campaign, he had the advantage of being one of the legal participants in the prize of the capture of the Peruvian ironclad Húascar [10]. Later, Otto was reinstated to the Regiment Artillería de Marina with the rank of lieutenant. He participated in the Battle of Pisagua and the Battle of Tarapacá, both in November, during the Campaign of Tarapacá, and the Battle of Tacna in May 1880, during the Campaign of Tacna–Arica [2]. During the course of the latter, his regiment was one of the military units that decided the Chilean victory in the centre of the battle line.

Having observed his good performance in the land campaign, Colonel Domingo Toro Herrera, commander of the Regiment Chacabuco, requested that Moltke be transferred to his command and appointed him as his aide-de-camp with the rank of captain in his regiment. With his new regiment, he prepared to fight in the Campaign of Lima. On 11 December, while in Pisco, he wrote a letter to his brother Karl about his good luck in the war and his impressions on the upcoming campaign for the Peruvian capital.

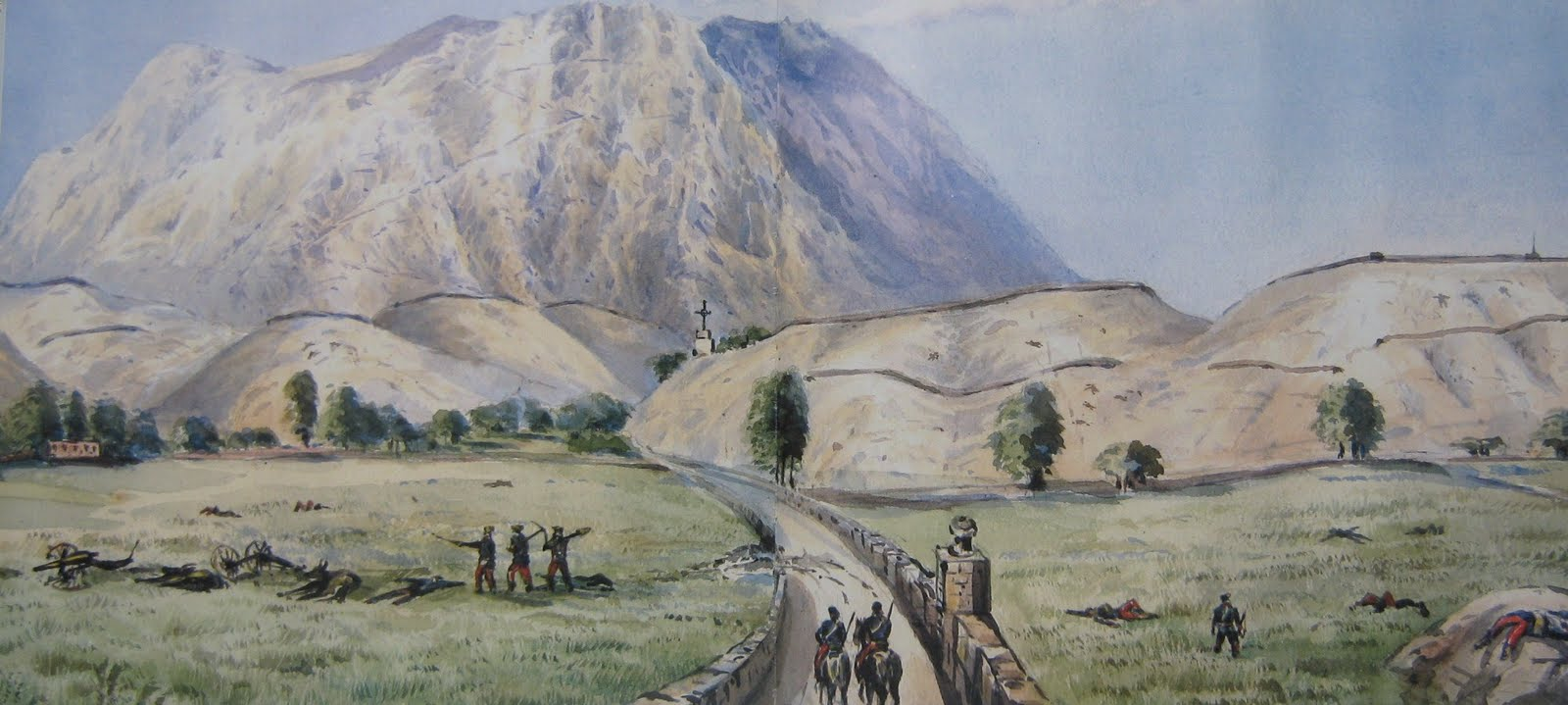
Watercolour made by the British naval officer Rudolph de Lisle in 1881, showing a part of the 1st Peruvian defence line where the battle of San Juan and Chorrillos was fought. In the background you can see the Morro Solar, a place where the Chilean attack was more difficult and bloody, and where Otto von Moltke was killed

Subsequently, on 26 December, after the Chilean landing in Curayaco, south of Lima, Otto, while on board the auxiliary cruiser Angamos, wrote his last letter to his brother Karl, in which he said the following:

My dear brother Karl, at this moment we have just anchored in the bay (of Curayaco); the rest of the army is already in Lurín, a point that, according to estimates, will be attacked by the Peruvians. As we are already in the vicinity of Lima, the great decisive battle will take place in the next few days. If I die, you will notify our father in the least painful way possible. My documents are deposited in the Regiment Chacabuco. Do not forget that he left you my share of the capture of the Húascar, as well as everything he left will be yours. I hope that after the battle I can bring you good news. Health!...

On 13 January 1881, Otto participated in the Battle of San Juan and Chorrillos, commanding the 4th Company of the 1st Battalion of the Regiment Chacabuco [12], which was part of the Amunátegui Brigade of the 1st Army Division in the battle, under Patricio Lynch. During the second phase of the battle, after Chilean forces captured the San Juan line, his regiment and the Regiment 4º de Línea were ordered to attack the strong Peruvian defences on the Morro Solar promontory; Otto did the same at the head of the company he commanded. In that place the Chilean forces were repelled with several casualties by the intense fire, having to retreat and abandon some trenches that they had managed to occupy in the face of the Peruvian counterattack. It was during this part of the battle that he was mortally wounded by a gunshot to the chest, and then his body was cruelly torn to pieces on the ground by Peruvian soldiers with rifle butts and knives. (Note: According to Vicuña Mackenna, the details of Otto's killed are not known with certainty. It has been pointed out that he died defending himself in a trench, being later torn to pieces, or that he died during the advance to the high Peruvian redoubt.)

In the aftermath of the battle, Morro Solar was occupied by Chilean troops, who recovered Moltke's remnants. His body was repatriated to Valparaíso under the special concern of the Bernstein family and was later buried on 4 April in the port's dissidents' cemetery. His funeral was carried out with an impressive night torch ceremony and a large attendance of authorities and institutions of the port. His father received a letter of condolence from the Chilean government.

It is said that Moltke possessed a limited command of the Spanish language, always referring to his military orderly as "the pogopi."

== See also ==
- German immigration in Chile

== Sources ==
- Vicuña Mackenna, Benjamín (1883). El álbum de la gloria de Chile. Homenaje al Ejército y Armada de Chile en la memoria de sus más ilustres marinos y soldados muertos por la patria en la guerra del Pacífico 1879-1883 (in Spanish). Vol. I. Santiago, Chile: Imprenta Cervantes.
- Siebert Held, Bruno (2006). "Militares de ascendencia germana en la guerra del Pacífico" (PDF). Anuario de la Academia de Historia Militar de Chile (in Spanish) (21). Santiago, Chile: 84–101.
