= Woltmann =

Woltmann is a German surname. Notable people with the surname include:

- Alfred Woltmann (1841–1880), German art historian
- Barbara Woltmann (born 1957), German politician
- Benjamin Woltmann (born 1990), German footballer
- Frederick Woltmann (1908–1965), American composer
- Ludwig Woltmann (1871–1907), German anthropologist, zoologist and Marxist theoretical

== See also ==
- Woltman
