= Mathilde Block =

German painter and embroiderer (1850–1932)

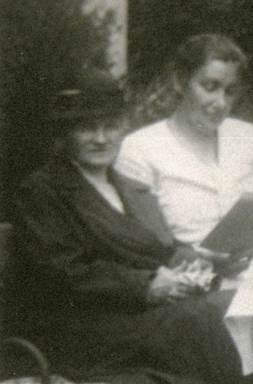
- Mathilde Block (left) in the 1920s
- Born: Auguste Betty Julie Mathilde Block; 10 July 1850; Niendorf an der Stecknitz, Duchy of Saxe-Lauenburg
- Died: 21 July 1932 (aged 82); Pinneberg, Schleswig-Holstein, Germany
- Other names: Mathilde Block-Niendorff
- Occupation: Painter
- Parents: Julius Friedrich Block (father); Auguste Henriette Wilhelmine Block (mother)

Mathilde Block (pseudonym: Mathilde Block-Niendorff; (Note: In order to avoid confusion with a painter of the same name who mainly painted flowers and was also with the Association of Artists in Berlin, she temporarily signed her pictures with Mathilde Block-Niendorff, based on her place of birth, while the flower painter in Exhibition catalogs sometimes appeared as Mathilde Block-Nordhausen.) née Auguste Betty Julie Mathilde Block; 10 July 1850 – 21 July 1932) was a German painter and embroiderer. Her artworks and paintings range from pencil portraits to embroidered quilts and have been exhibited in numerous art expositions throughout the world.

== Early life ==
Mathilde Block was born on 10 July 1850 in Niendorf an der Stecknitz in the Duchy of Saxe-Lauenburg. She was the daughter of Julius Friedrich Block (1806–1854), who was a pastor in a local Roman Catholic church, and his wife Auguste Henriette Wilhelmine Block, née Rosa (1819–1908). When Mathilde was three years old, her father died. A small parsonage widow's house was built for her mother, Mathilde, and her two siblings, into which they moved when it was finished creating.

Mathilde Block used to draw since she was a kid. The oldest documented evidence of her early drawing skills is five portraits of Niendorf farmers, which she is said to have drawn at the age of twelve. Mathilde was tutored by her mother, supported by her father's successor, Pastor Fiedler. After discovering her talent in art, she was sent to Ratzeburg for a year and a half, where she attended secondary school. Back in Niendorf, at the age of sixteen, she started her first job as a teacher for two and a half years. To be able to support her mother, who lived only on a small pension and some manual labor, she looked for a better-paid position as a tutor in Burg Stargard at Stargard Castle. She stayed there for four and a half years. During the following year and a half, she devoted herself to training in drawing. She also received a scholarship.

== Career ==
In October 1875, she moved to Berlin. She received a two-year freelance position from Crown Princess Victoria in the Viktoria-Pensionat or Viktoria-Stift (retirement home in Erfurt) from the Lette-Verein and attended the association's arts and crafts drawing school. At the same time, until 1 July 1877, she also took courses in the drawing school of the Vereins der Künstlerinnen und Kunstfreundinnen (Association of Berlin Women Artists). One of their lecturers there was Professor Adolf Eybel. In recognition of her efforts and the successes she had already achieved, she received a silver medal from the Lette-Verein in January 1877. In September 1877, she applied to the Prussian Academy of Arts for being a drawing teacher, for that she had to give an exam. She passed the exam with good grades. She worked as a drawing teacher in Berlin, meanwhile, she also took private lessons from Gustav Graef, also in whose studio she had begun oil painting.

On 4 March 1878 Mathilde received another scholarship for two years from the Landscape Collegium of the Herzogtum Lauenburg in Ratzeburg, retrospectively until the beginning of the year, for which she had previously applied in writing. Other painters with whom Mathilde Block took private lessons in Berlin over the years included Karl Gussow, Franz Skarbina, and Friedrich Geselschap. In 1892 she joined the Society of Friends of the Academy of Arts (De Akademie der Künste) in which she remained until 1927. She won three prizes in the club's art competitions.

== Death ==
Mathilde Block died on 21 June 1932 in Pinneberg. She was buried in her old home in Niendorf, as she had wished beforehand, in the cemetery next to the church where her father was the pastor.

== Exhibitions (selection) ==
- 1887 or 1888: Exhibition in Mölln
- 1888: 60th exhibition of the Academy of Arts, Berlin
- 1889: 61st exhibition of the Academy of Arts, Berlin
- 1891: International exhibition organized by the Association of Berlin Artists (Verein Berliner Künstler) on the occasion of its 50th anniversary.
- 1891: Fifth exhibition of the Poznan Art Association.
- 1892: 13th art exhibition of the Association of Women Artists in Berlin
- 1892: 63rd exhibition of the Academy of Arts, Berlin
- 1893: World's Columbian Exposition
- 1893: Große Berliner Kunstausstellung
- 1894: 14th art exhibition of the Association of Women Artists in Berlin
- 1895: Große Berliner Kunstausstellung
- 1895: German-Nordic trade and industry exhibition (Deutsch-Nordische Handels- und Industrie-Ausstellung) in Lübeck
- 1897: Große Berliner Kunstausstellung
- 1898: 16th art exhibition of the Association of Women Artists in Berlin
- 1899: Große Berliner Kunstausstellung
- 1901: 17th art exhibition of the Association of Women Artists in Berlin
- 1901: Große Berliner Kunstausstellung
- 1902: Große Berliner Kunstausstellung
- 1904: Louisiana Purchase Exposition (international exposition in St. Louis)
- 1906-1908: Große Berliner Kunstausstellung
- 1909: Art Exhibition in Düsseldorf
- 1918: Art Exhibition in Berlin

=== Posthumously ===
- 1933: An exhibition in Pinneberg, organized by her sister Therese, in which her watercolor paintings were shown.

== Work (selection) ==
- 1862: Fünf Köpfe Niendorfer Bauern (Five heads of Niendorf farmers; pencil).
- 1878: Collaborative artwork with Martha Endell, a commemorative sheet of The Association of Women Artists in Berlin for Kaiser Wilhelm I, which was to commemorate the failed assassination attempt on him on 11 May 1878.
- 1879: Bildnis eines jungen Mädchens (Portrait of a young girl; pastel).
- 1884: Damenporträt (portrait of a young woman; oil on canvas)- Staatliches Museum Schwerin.
- 1885: Christus am Kreuz (Christ on the Cross; oil on canvas)- St. Georg auf dem Berge (Ratzeburg).
- 1886: Portrait of Pastor Adolf Moraht (oil on canvas).
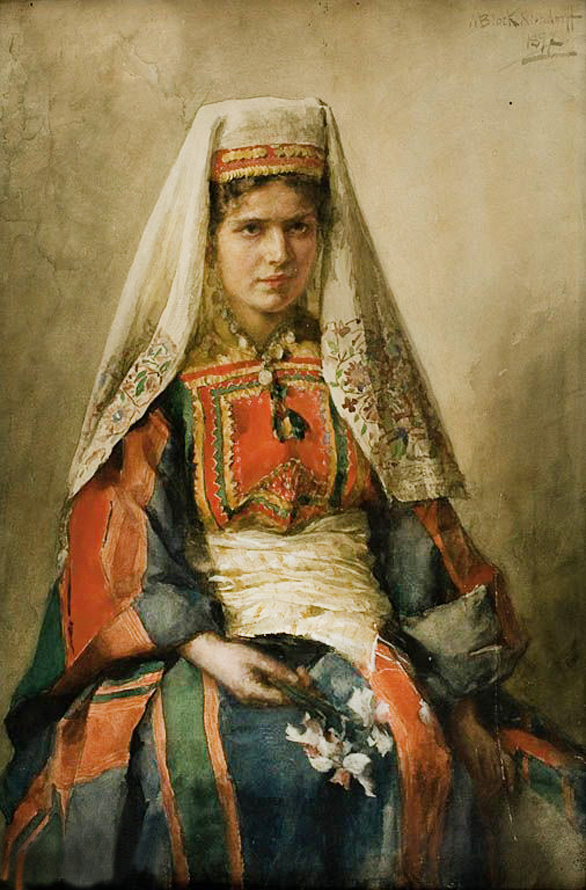
Bethlehemitin by Mathilde Block (1897)

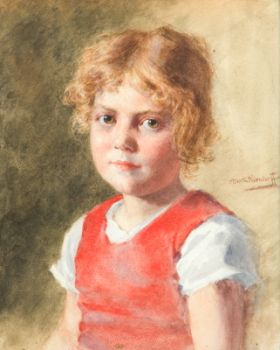
Brustporträt eines kleinen Mädchens

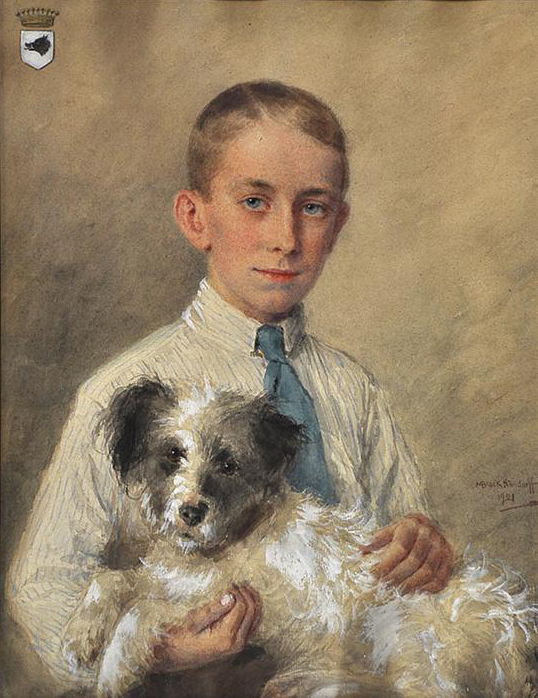
Jugendbildnis des Grafen Albrecht von Hardenberg (1921)

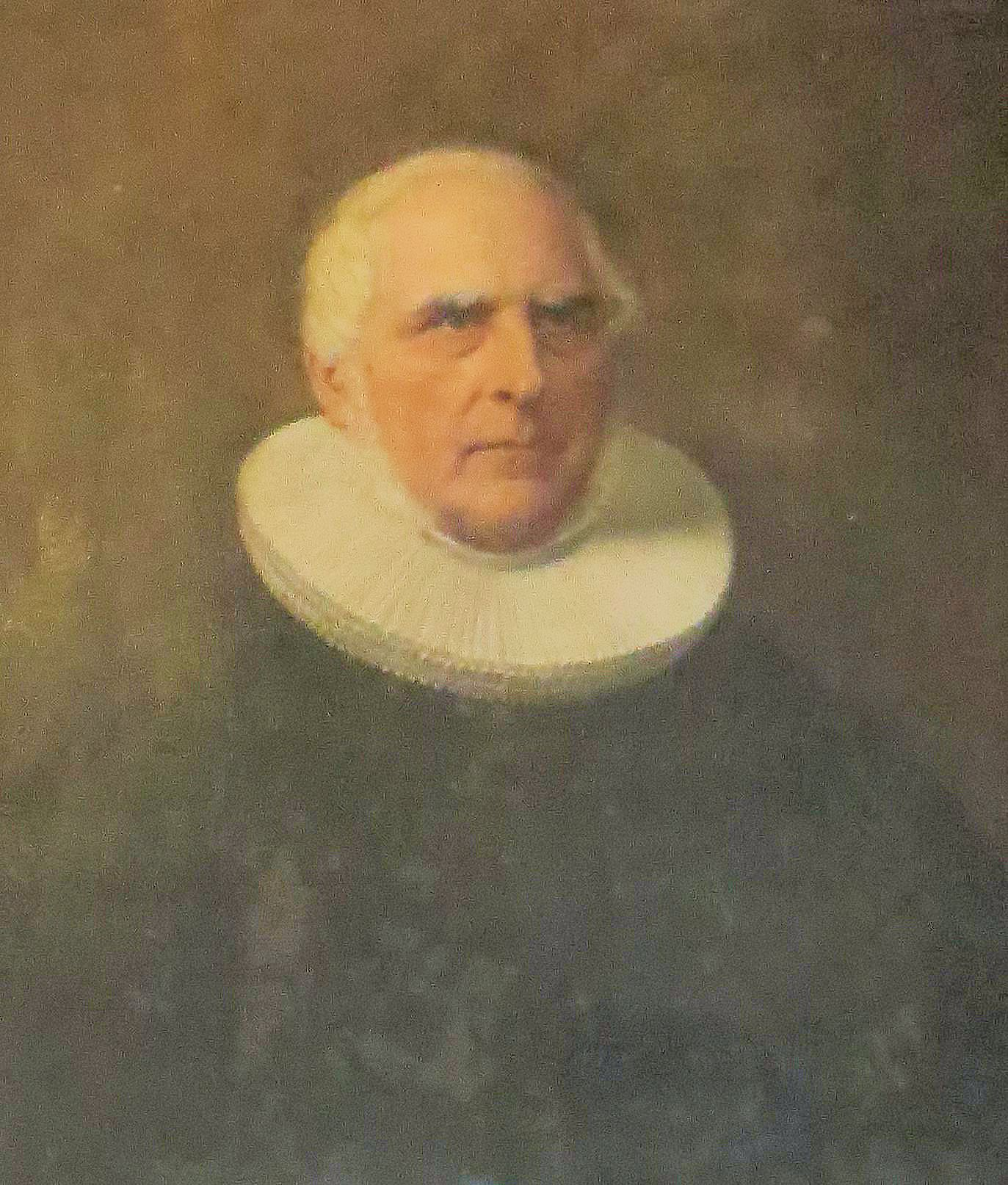
Portrait of Johannes Rußwurm (1892)

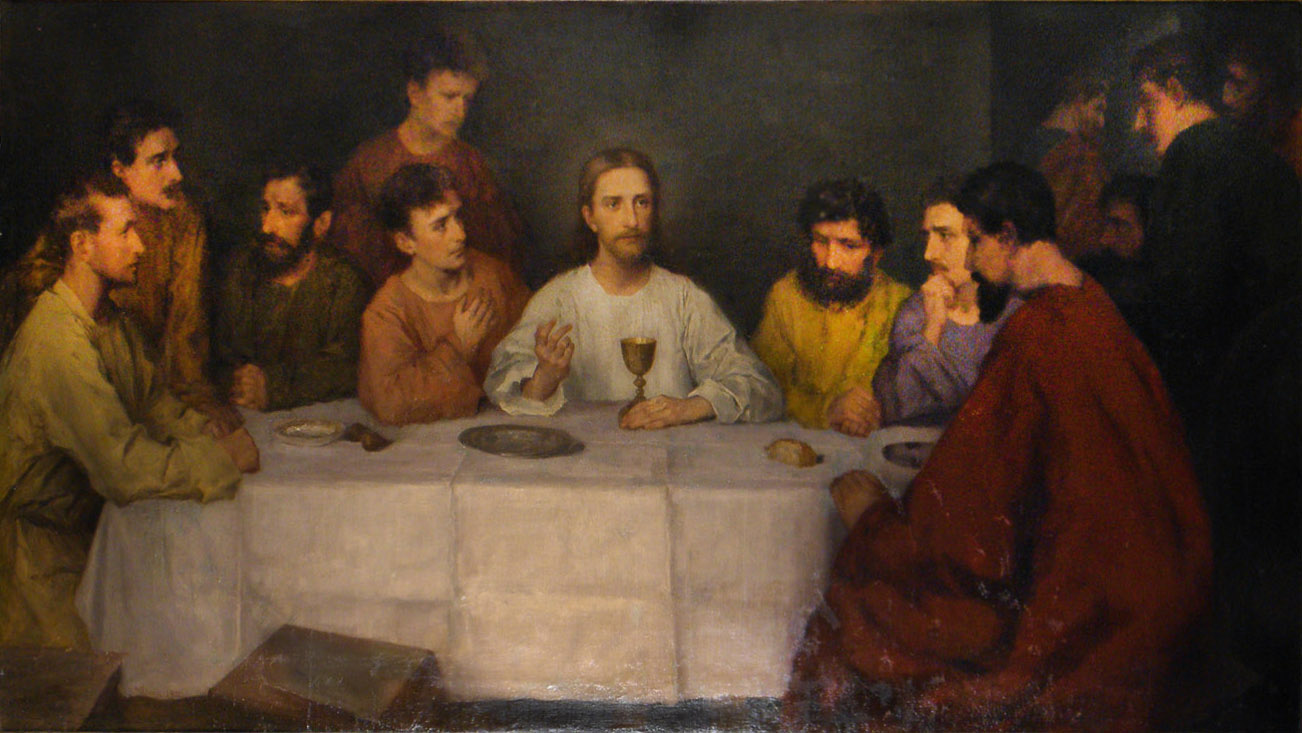
Das Abendmahl (1906)

Portrait of Oskar Ferdinand von Walcke-Schuldt (1887)
