= Elbe–Lübeck Canal =

Waterway in northern Germany

Coordinates: 53°33′N 10°40′E

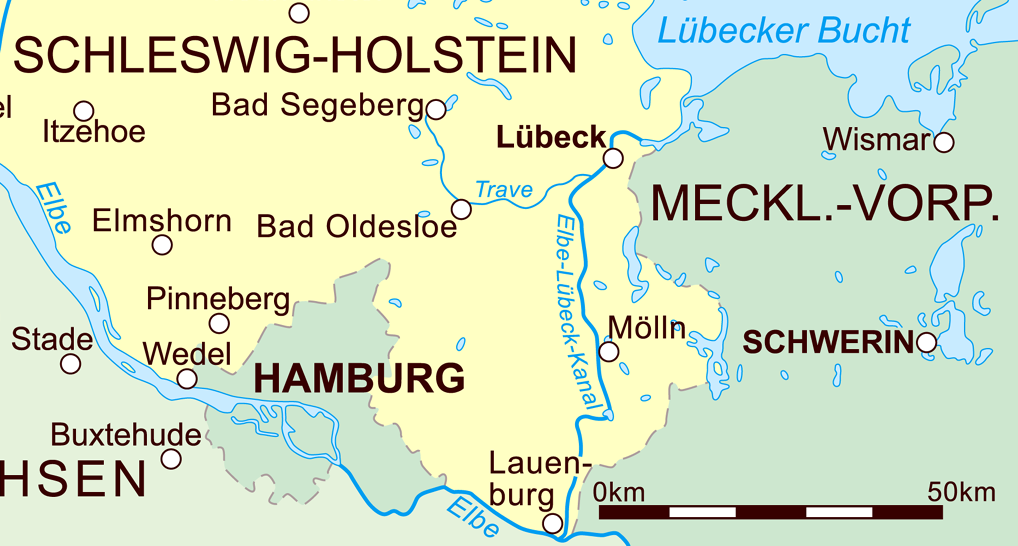
- The canal in eastern Schleswig-Holstein

Specifications
- Length: 40 miles (64 km)
- Locks: 7

History
- Construction began: 1895
- Date completed: 1900

Geography
- Start point: Lauenburg (Elbe)
- End point: Lübeck (Trave)

The Elbe–Lübeck Canal (German: Elbe-Lübeck-Kanal, pronounced [ɛlbəˈlyːbɛkkaˌnaːl]; also known as the Elbe–Trave Canal) is an artificial waterway in eastern Schleswig-Holstein, Germany. It connects the rivers Elbe and Trave, creating an inland water route across the drainage divide from the North Sea to the Baltic Sea. The canal includes seven locks and runs for a length of 64 kilometres (40 mi) between the cities of Lübeck in the north and Lauenburg in the south by way of the Mölln lakes. The modern canal was built in the 1890s to replace the Stecknitz Canal, a medieval watercourse linking the same two rivers.

== Preceding canal ==
The older Stecknitz Canal had first connected Lauenburg and Lübeck on the Old Salt Route by linking the tiny rivers Stecknitz (a tributary of the Trave) and Delvenau (a tributary of the Elbe). Built between 1391 and 1398, the Stecknitz Canal was the first European summit-level canal and one of the earliest artificial waterways in Europe.

== History ==
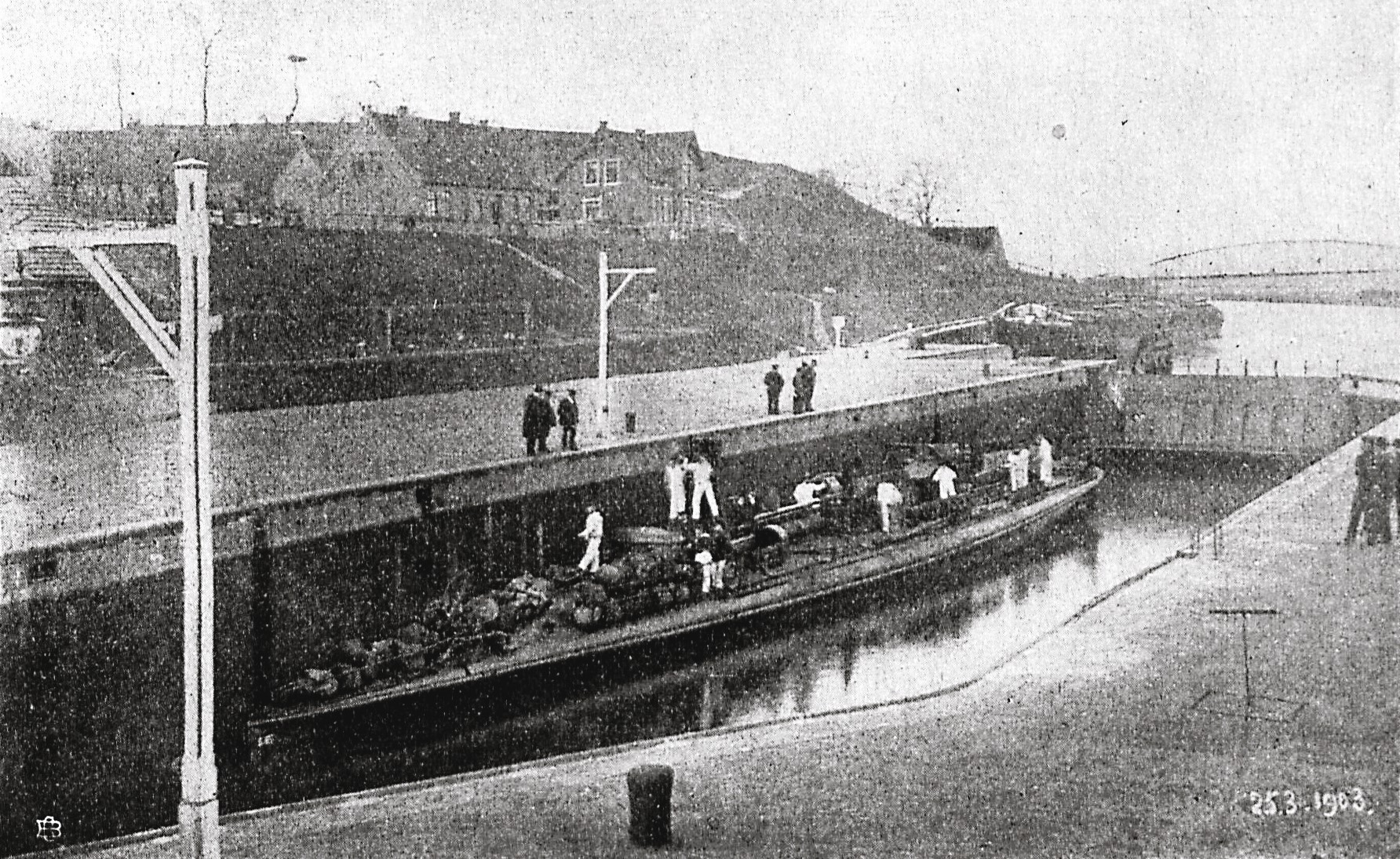
The Imperial German torpedo boat S65 making the first transit of the Elbe–Lübeck Canal by a warship in 1903

After German unification in the late nineteenth century, there was a burst of canal-building within the new German Empire. The Stecknitz Canal had been in service for centuries, but newer vessels demanded deeper and wider canals, and modern engineering offered the possibility of rebuilding and enlarging the venerable waterway. In 1893 the German government closed the Stecknitz Canal to barge traffic, and in 1895 construction began on a widened and straightened waterway which includes some of the old canal's watercourse. The new Elbe–Lübeck Canal was inaugurated by German Emperor Wilhelm II and opened to shipping traffic in 1900. Today it continues to carry substantial freight traffic, as well as offering a scenic route for pleasure craft.

== Technology ==
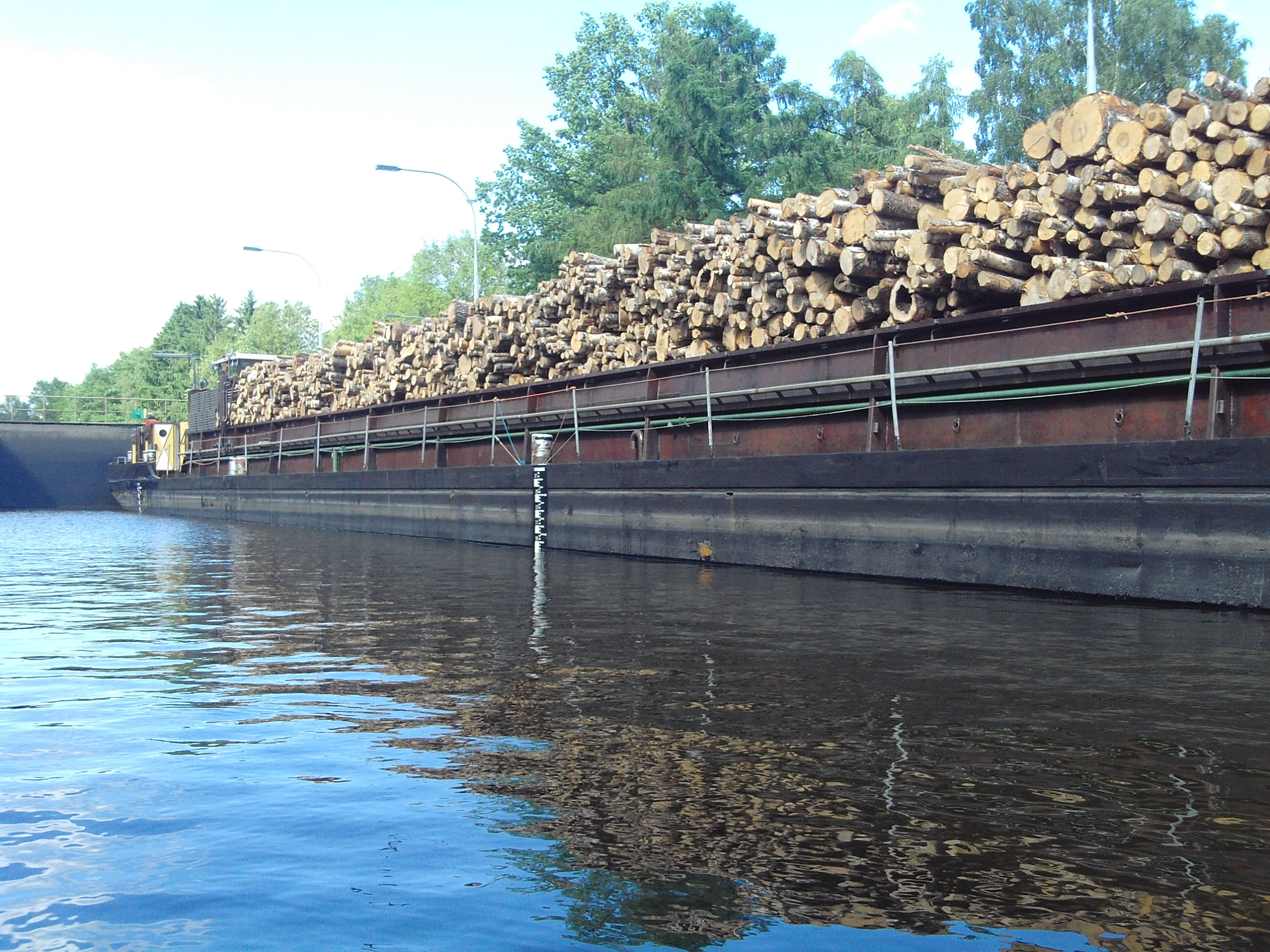
A barge loaded with timber in a lock on the Elbe–Lübeck Canal

The canal passes through two locks ascending from the Elbe to the canal's highest point and five locks descending from the high point to the Trave. Each lock was built with an interior length of 80 metres (260 ft) and an interior width of 12 metres (39 ft).
