= Helga Kleiner =

German politician (born 1935)

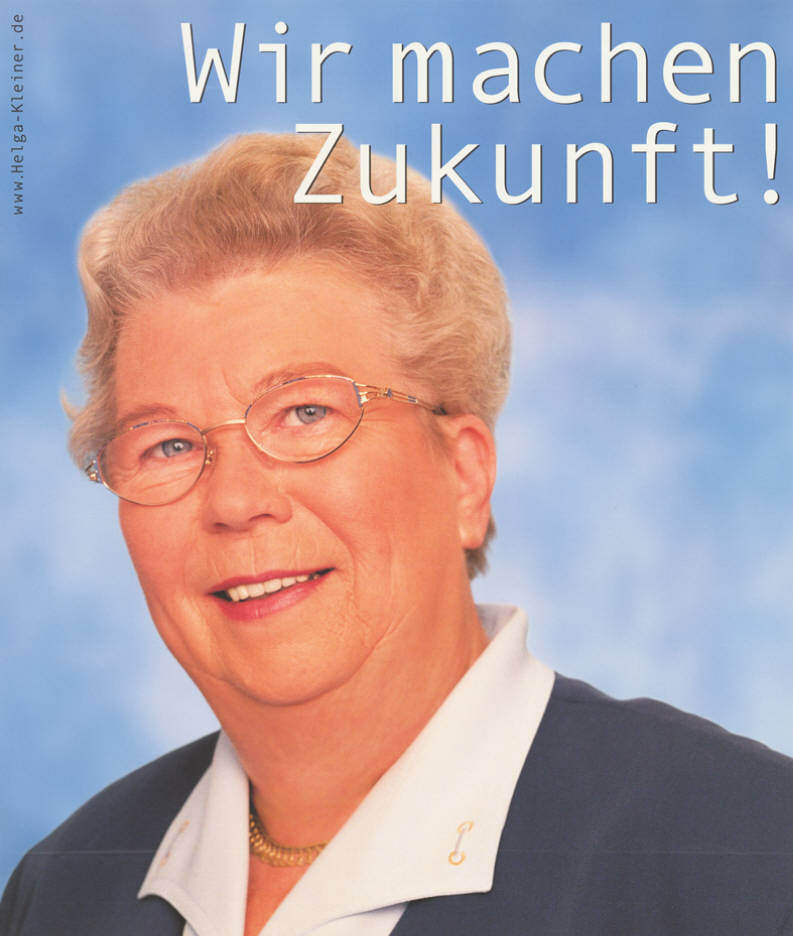
- Kleiner in 2000

Member of the Landtag of Schleswig-Holstein
- In office 28 March 2000 – 17 March 2005
- Constituency: Party list
- In office 5 May 1992 – 23 April 1996
- Constituency: Party list

Member of the Lübeck City Council
- In office 2 March 1986 – June 1992
- Succeeded by: Ingrid Schatz
- Constituency: Party list

Personal details
- Born: Helga Martens; 28 January 1935 (age 91) Mölln, Prussia, Germany
- Party: Christian Democratic Union
- Spouse: Herr Kleiner
- Children: 2
- Education: HLA Flensburg
- Awards: Federal Cross of Merit

Helga Kleiner (née Martens; born 28 January 1935) is a German politician from Schleswig-Holstein. A member of the Christian Democratic Union, she is a prominent campaigner for senior citizens' interests and has held a number of leadership positions in the CDU's Senior Citizens' Union. Kleiner was a member of the Lübeck City Council from 1986 until 1992, and served two non-consecutive terms in the Landtag of Schleswig-Holstein between 1992 and 2005.

== Biography ==
Helga Kleiner (née Martens) was born on 28 January 1935 in the town of Mölln in Schleswig-Holstein. She is Protestant and has two children. After receiving her Mittlere Reife, she attended HLA Flensburg – a business school in Flensburg – for one year. She worked as an office clerk until 1961.

In 1966, Kleiner joined the Christian Democratic Union, becoming district chair of the CDU's Women's Union in Lübeck for ten years. Throughout her political career, Kleiner was a prominent advocate for senior citizen interests and held a number of high-ranking positions in the CDU's Senior Citizens' Union (SU). She was the chair of the Lübeck SU from 1983 until 1993, and became the chair of the Schleswig-Holstein SU since 1999 – having previously held the position of deputy chair from 1992 until 1999 – and has been honorary chair since at least 2015. She also became the deputy chair of the national SU in 2002.

Kleiner was elected to the Lübeck City Council in the 1986 election from the CDU party list, and was re-elected in 1990. While on the city council, she was part of the CDU executive committee and was chair of the housing committee. She was also a member of the social affairs, school, headmaster election, building, youth welfare, and petitions committees, as well as the spokesperson of the police advisory board.

In the 1992 state election, Kleiner was elected to the Landtag of Schleswig-Holstein from the party list. She resigned from the Lübeck City Council in June 1992 to take her seat, and was replaced by Ingrid Schatz. During her term, Kleiner was a member of the social committee and a deputy member of the education committee. She left the state parliament at the end of her term on 23 April 1996. Kleiner was elected again from the party list in the 2000 election, again leaving parliament at the end of her term on 17 March 2005. In her second term, Kleiner retained both of her previous committeeships, and also became a deputy member of the petitions and judicial selection committees. She was also the CDU parliamentary group's spokesperson for senior citizens' policy. In this role, she "pointed out the consequences of demographic change", and campaigned in favor of adding Article 5a (Note: "The country protects the rights and interests of people in need of care and promotes care that enables all those in need of care to live a life in dignity".) as an amendment to the state constitution.

For her public service, Kleiner was awarded the Federal Cross of Merit, 1st class, in 2007 by President Horst Köhler. She was also awarded the Konrad Adenauer Medal in November 2010, and the Schleswig-Holstein SU's Freedom Medal in January 2015.
