= Delvenau =

River in Germany

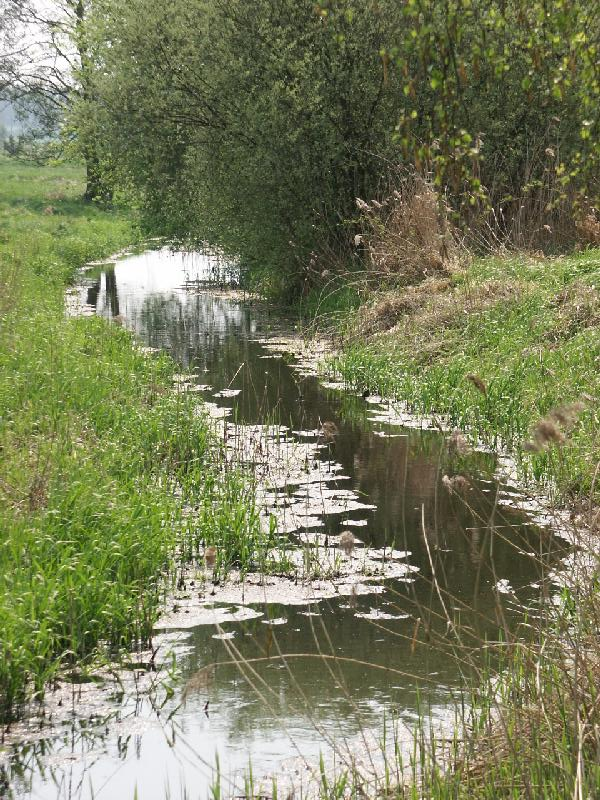

Location
- Country: Germany
- States: Schleswig-Holstein and Mecklenburg-Vorpommern

Physical characteristics
- Mouth
  - location: Elbe–Lübeck Canal
  - coordinates: 53°22′26″N 10°34′51″E

Basin features
- Progression: Elbe–Lübeck Canal→ Elbe→ North Sea

Delvenau (incorrectly known today as: Stecknitz) is a 50-kilometre-long (31 mi) river in Herzogtum Lauenburg in Schleswig-Holstein, Germany. It begins in Büchen, flows to the Elbe–Lübeck Canal near its confluence with the Elbe in Lauenburg. The lower section between Bröthen and Lauenburg forms the border between Schleswig-Holstein and Mecklenburg-Vorpommern.

The name Delvenau originates from the Middle Low German word delf meaning trench.

== See also ==
- Stecknitz
- List of rivers of Schleswig-Holstein
- List of rivers of Mecklenburg-Vorpommern
