= Reinhard Woltman =

German hydraulic engineer

Reinhard Woltman (sometimes spelled Woltmann (December 28, 1757 – April 20, 1837) was a German hydraulic engineer best known for the invention of the Woltman turbine-based flow measurement device.

Woltman was born in Axstedt to Johann and his wife, Adelheit née Jacobsen. He worked as a schoolteacher at Axstedt until 1779 and then went to work as a clerk in the Ritzebüttel Coastal Protection Office in Hamburg. After studying mathematics and hydraulic engineering at Hamburg under Johann Georg Büsch he became a civil engineer. He studied dyke construction at the University of Kiel with Johann Nicolaus Tetens followed by visits to the University of Göttingen and then travelled across Europe in 1784. He earned a reputation as a hydraulic engineer and worked across Germany and also in France. He advised on the expansion of the Stecknitz Canal and worked on the Elbe-Weser canal. His books were well known and in 1790 he designed a turbine based device for measuring the flow of water. Woltman also wrote on navigation, and soil mechanics.

Woltman married Johanna Elizabeth daughter of Jacob Schuback in 1797 and they had five children. He died in Hamburg where a street was named after him in 1843. Several ships have been named after him.
