= Mölln, Schleswig-Holstein =

Mölln
- Town
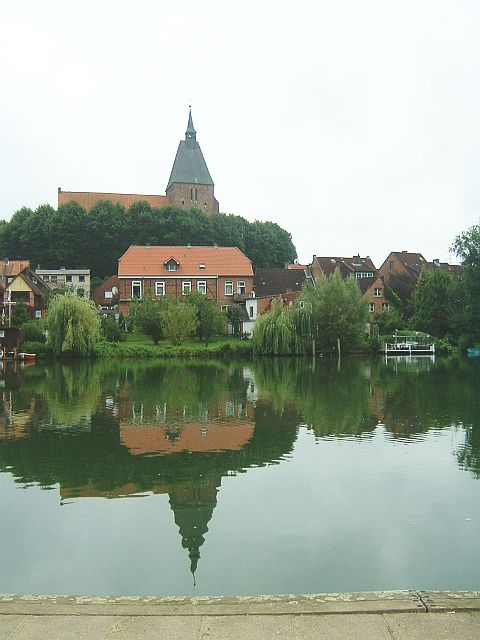

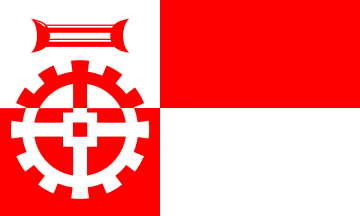
- Flag Coat of arms

- Location of Mölln within Lauenburg district
- Interactive map of Mölln
- Location within Germany Location within Schleswig-Holstein
- Coordinates: 53°37′37″N 10°41′05″E
- Country: Germany
- State: Schleswig-Holstein
- District: Lauenburg

Government
  - Mayor: Ingo Schäper (Ind.)

Area
  - Total: 25.05 km^{2} (9.67 sq mi)
- Elevation: 19 m (62 ft)

Population (2025-12-31)
  - Total: 19,513
  - Density: 779.0/km^{2} (2,018/sq mi)
- Time zone: UTC+01:00 (CET)
  - Summer (DST): UTC+02:00 (CEST)
- Postal codes: 23879
- Dialling codes: 04542
- Vehicle registration: RZ
- Website: www.moelln.de

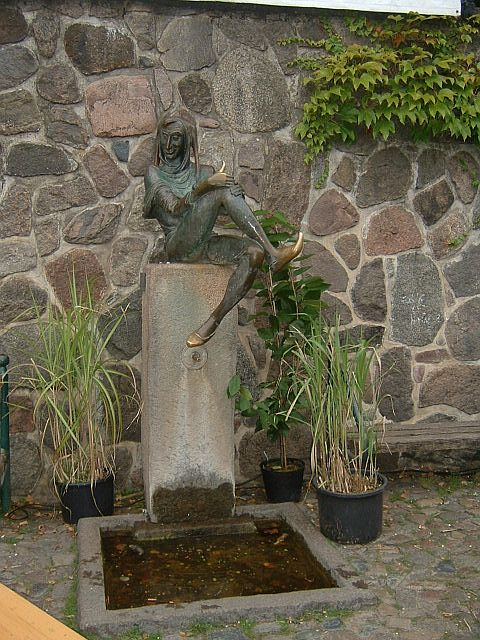
Eulenspiegel fountain

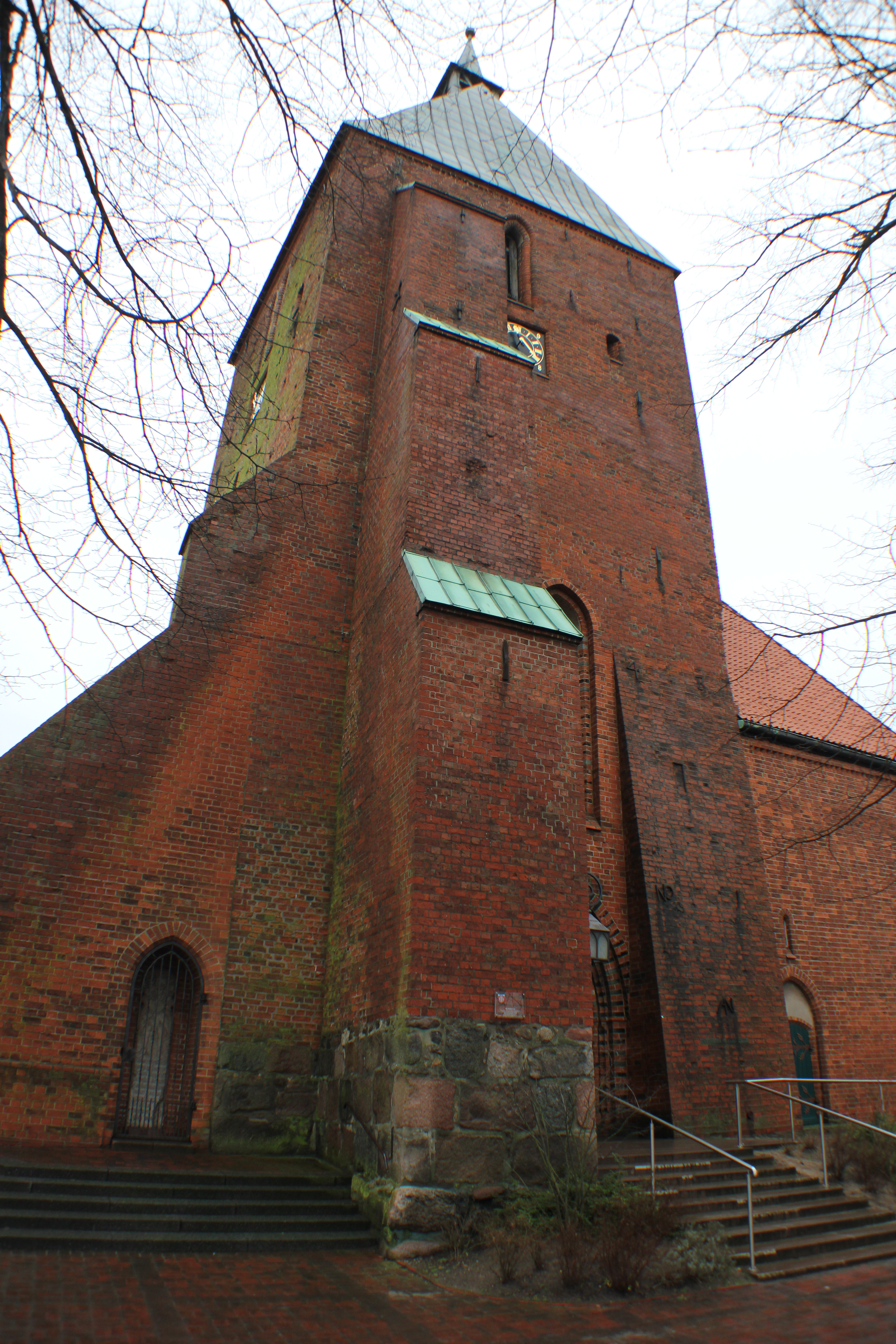
St. Nicolai and Eulenspiegel-Grave

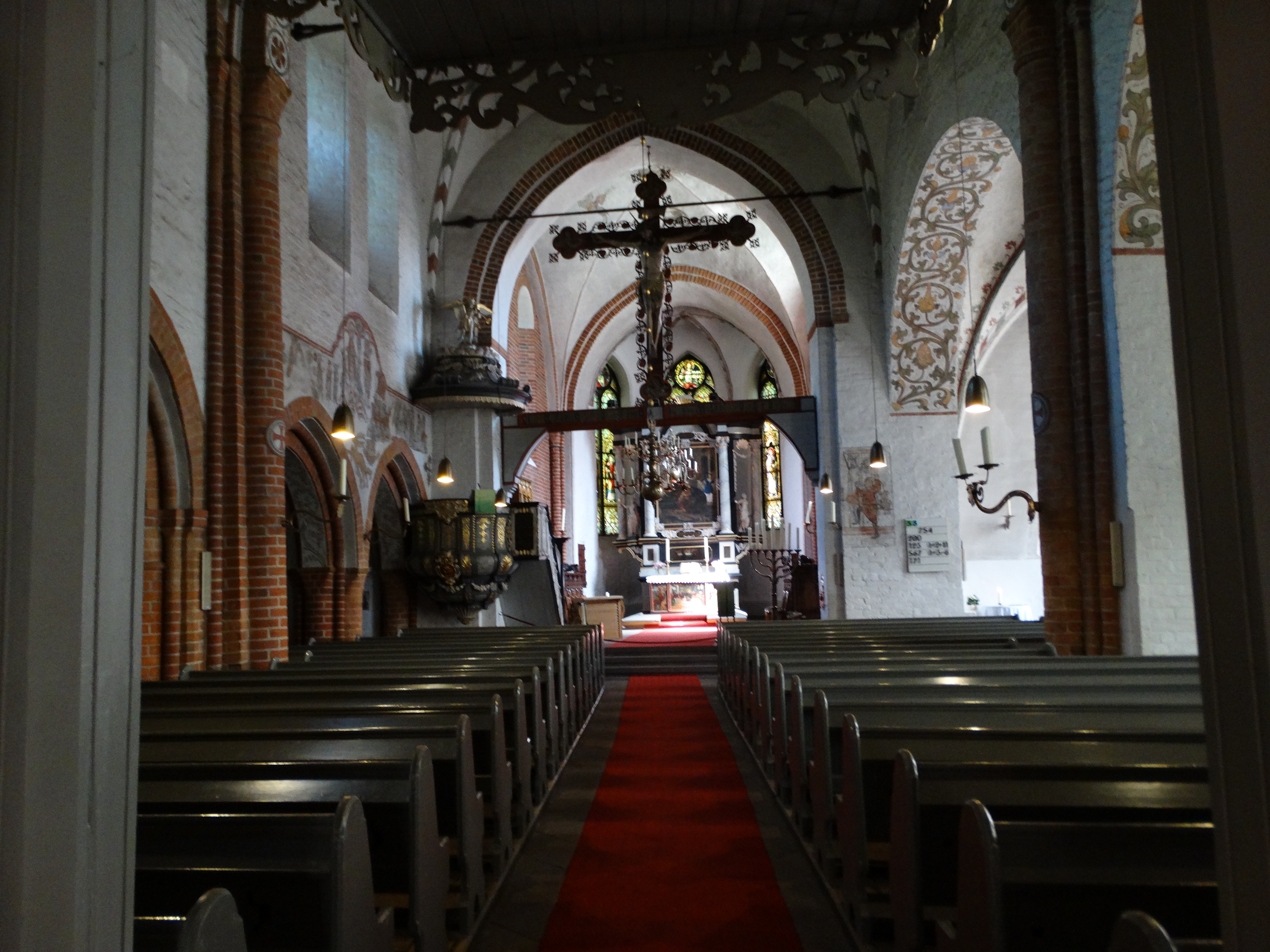
St. Nicolaus Church (inner view)

Mölln (German pronunciation: [mœln]) is a town in Schleswig-Holstein, Germany. It is surrounded by several small lakes (Stadtsee, Schulsee, Ziegelsee, Hegesee, Schmalsee, Lütauer See, Drüsensee, and Pinnsee). The Elbe-Lübeck Canal flows through the town. Mölln belongs to the district of Herzogtum Lauenburg.

== History ==
The town was founded in the 12th century. It rapidly became an important town, due to the Old Salt Route, through which the salt produced in the salt mines of Lüneburg (Lower-Saxony) was shipped to the Baltic harbour of Lübeck, and the Stecknitz Canal, which was a precursor of today's Elbe-Lübeck Canal. Although situated in the midst of the medieval duchy of Lauenburg, the town was mortgaged to the Hanseatic town of Lübeck, which ruled Mölln from 1359 to 1683. Back from this time dates the Möllner Schützengilde von 1407 e.V. which was founded over 600 years ago and still exists today with almost 300 members.

Mölln calls itself the Eulenspiegel town, because of Till Eulenspiegel, a legendary trickster known for exposing vices and provoking thought. Eulenspiegel is said to have lived in Braunschweig (Brunswick), but his last year of life he allegedly resided in Mölln. He died from the plague in 1350. Although his existence is not proven, there are several monuments to him in Mölln.

In 1992, right-wing extremists set fire to Turkish-inhabited houses, killing three girls.

== Twin cities ==
- Hagenow, Germany, since October 2, 1990
- Maszewo (gmina, West Pomeranian), Poland, since June 29, 1992.

== Notable people ==
- Johann Gottfried Müthel (1728–1788), composer and noted keyboard virtuoso.
- Karl Gatermann the Elder (1883–1959), painter and graphic artist
- Helga Kleiner (born 1935), politician
- Willi Padge (1943–2023), coxswain, and team gold medallist in rowing at the 1960 Summer Olympics
- Thomas Ahrens (born 1948), coxswain, and team silver medallist in rowing at the 1964 Summer Olympics
- Axel Meyer (born 1960), evolutionary biologist and professor of zoology at the University of Konstanz
