= Henry Woltman =

American neurologist

Henry William Woltman (16 June 1889 – 1 November 1964) was an American neurologist and the first neurologist at the Mayo Clinic in Rochester, Minnesota. Moersch-Woltman syndrome and Woltman sign are named for him. He had a wife and four children. He died in 1964. The Henry W. Woltman Award was first awarded in 1966.
