= Frederick Woltmann =

American composer, pianist

Frederick Woltmann (b. Flushing, New York, May 13, 1908; d. Los Angeles, California, October 20, 1965) was an American composer.

Woltmann received a degree in chemistry from Brooklyn Polytechnic, studied architecture at Columbia University, then matriculated at the Eastman School of Music with Bernard Rogers and Howard Hanson (graduated 1933). In 1937 he received a Juilliard Fellowship to the American Academy in Rome (Prix de Rome).

He served in the army during World War II, as part of a unit of artists in the Ghost Army. Unfortunately, he was mustered out with a muscle condition before the unit went overseas.

He composed many orchestral and choral works. His works were performed by the New York Philharmonic, the Philadelphia Orchestra, and many others. About 1950 he moved to Los Angeles.

== Work list ==
ORCHESTRA:

- Songs for Autumn for baritone, soprano (1937)
- Song of the Forest Dweller (1932)
- Dance of the Torch Bearers (1932)
- Poem for horn and strings (1936)
- Concerto for Piano (1937)
- Pool of Pegasus (1937)
- Variations on an Old English Folk Song for piano and orchestra (1938)
- The Coliseum at Night for orchestra (1939)
- Solitude for orchestra (1942)
- Symphony, From Leaves of Grass, for voice (1946)
- Poem for flute (1935)
- Rhapsody for horn (1935)
- Legend for cello (1936)

CHAMBER WORKS:

- From Dover Beach for baritone (1938)
- Scherzo for 8 winds (1937)
- Suite for Judy for piano and orchestra (1944)
- Songs from a Chinese Lute for voice and 33 instruments (1936)

Ref:
