= Woltman sign =

- Differential diagnosis: hypothyroidism or anorexia nervosa

Woltman's sign (also called Woltman's sign of hypothyroidism or, in older references, myxedema reflex) is a delayed relaxation phase of an elicited deep tendon reflex, usually tested in the Achilles tendon of the patient.

Woltman's sign is named for Henry Woltman, an American neurologist.

== Associated conditions ==
The delayed ankle jerks are associated with:

- hypothyroidism;
- Huntington's disease;
- several neurological symptoms;
- anorexia nervosa;
- extreme old age;
- beta-blockers or other drugs; and/or
- hypothermia.

== History ==
In 1924, William Calvert Chaney (1888–1965), who worked under Henry Woltman at the Mayo Clinic, seems to have been the first to publish a description of the sign, but Woltman had no authorship and was not mentioned in Chaney's manuscript. The eponym "Woltman's sign of myxedema" was first published in 1956 at the time of Woltman's retirement.
