= Niendorf an der Stecknitz =

- Municipality
- Flag Coat of arms

- Location of Niendorf an der Stecknitz within Herzogtum Lauenburg district
- Interactive map of Niendorf an der Stecknitz
- Location within Germany Location within Schleswig-Holstein
- Coordinates: 53°35′N 10°36′E
- Country: Germany
- State: Schleswig-Holstein
- District: Herzogtum Lauenburg
- Municipal assoc.: Breitenfelde

Government
  - Mayor: Friedhelm Wenck

Area
  - Total: 8.41 km^{2} (3.25 sq mi)
- Elevation: 69 m (226 ft)

Population (2025-12-31)
  - Total: 665
  - Density: 79.1/km^{2} (205/sq mi)
- Time zone: UTC+01:00 (CET)
  - Summer (DST): UTC+02:00 (CEST)
- Postal codes: 23881
- Dialling codes: 04156
- Vehicle registration: RZ
- Website: Official website

Niendorf an der Stecknitz (German pronunciation: [ˈniːndɔʁf ʔan deːɐ̯ ˈʃtɛknɪts], lit. 'Niendorf on the Stecknitz') is a municipality in the district of Lauenburg, in Schleswig-Holstein, Germany.
