= Lauenburg =

- Town
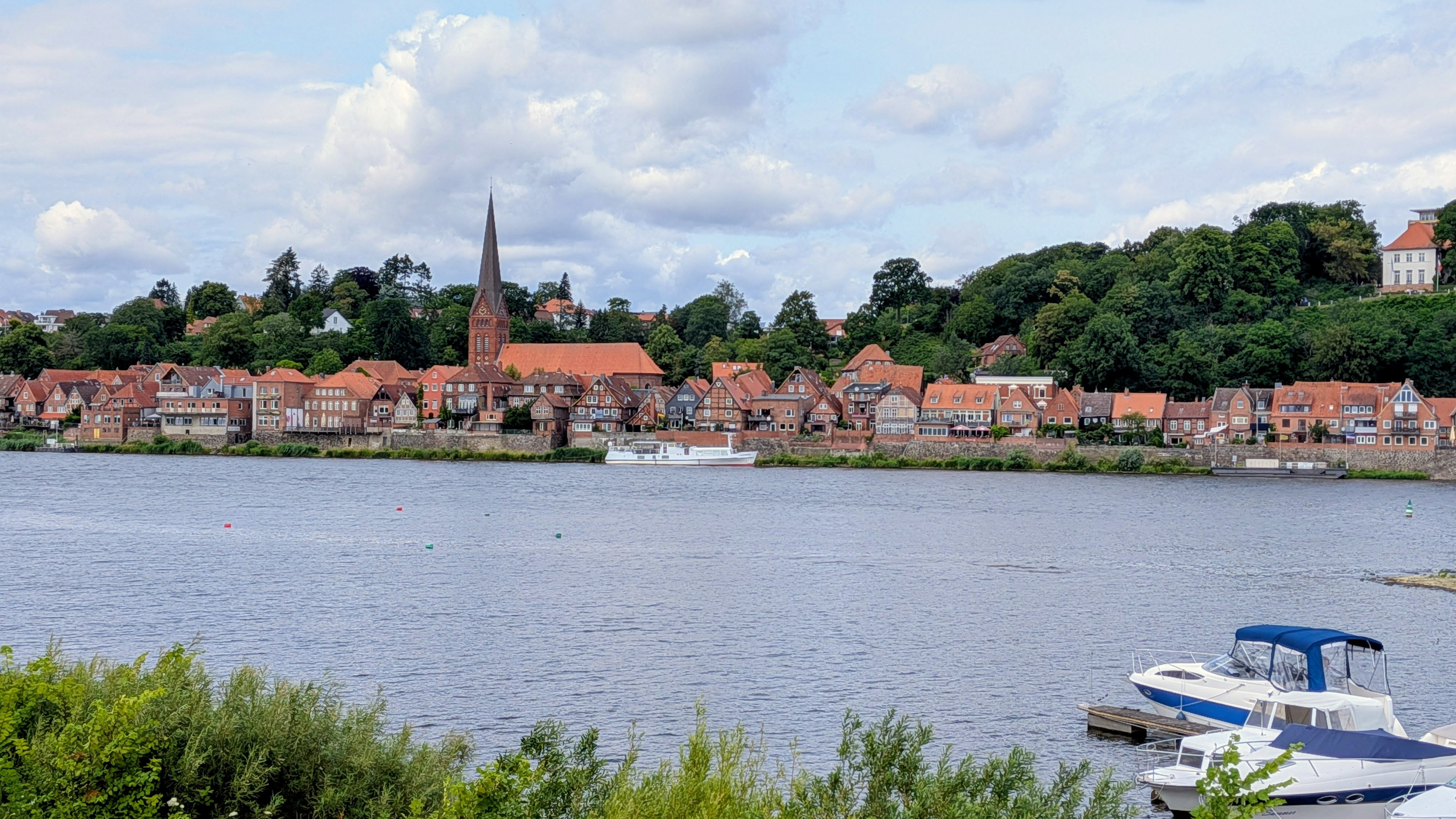
- View from the Elbe

- Flag Coat of arms

- Location of Lauenburg within Lauenburg district
- Interactive map of Lauenburg
- Location within Germany Location within Schleswig-Holstein
- Coordinates: 53°23′N 10°34′E
- Country: Germany
- State: Schleswig-Holstein
- District: Lauenburg

Government
  - Mayor: Andreas Thiede

Area
  - Total: 9.56 km^{2} (3.69 sq mi)
- Elevation: 49 m (161 ft)

Population (2025-12-31)
  - Total: 11,701
  - Density: 1,220/km^{2} (3,170/sq mi)
- Time zone: UTC+01:00 (CET)
  - Summer (DST): UTC+02:00 (CEST)
- Postal codes: 21481
- Dialling codes: 04153
- Vehicle registration: RZ
- Website: www.lauenburg.de

Lauenburg (German pronunciation: [ˈlaʊənbʊʁk]), or Lauenburg an der Elbe (English: "Lauenburg on the Elbe"; Low German: Loonborg), is a town in the state of Schleswig-Holstein, Germany. It is situated on the northern bank of the river Elbe, east of Hamburg. It is overall the southernmost town of Schleswig-Holstein and belongs to the district (German: Kreis) of Herzogtum Lauenburg.

== History ==
The town was founded in 1182 by the Ascanian Duke Bernard of Saxony, the ancestor of the Dukes of Lauenburg. It took its name from that of the castle of Lowenborch (erected here between 1181 and 1182), deriving from Lave, the Polabian-language name of the Elbe (compare modern Czech Labe).

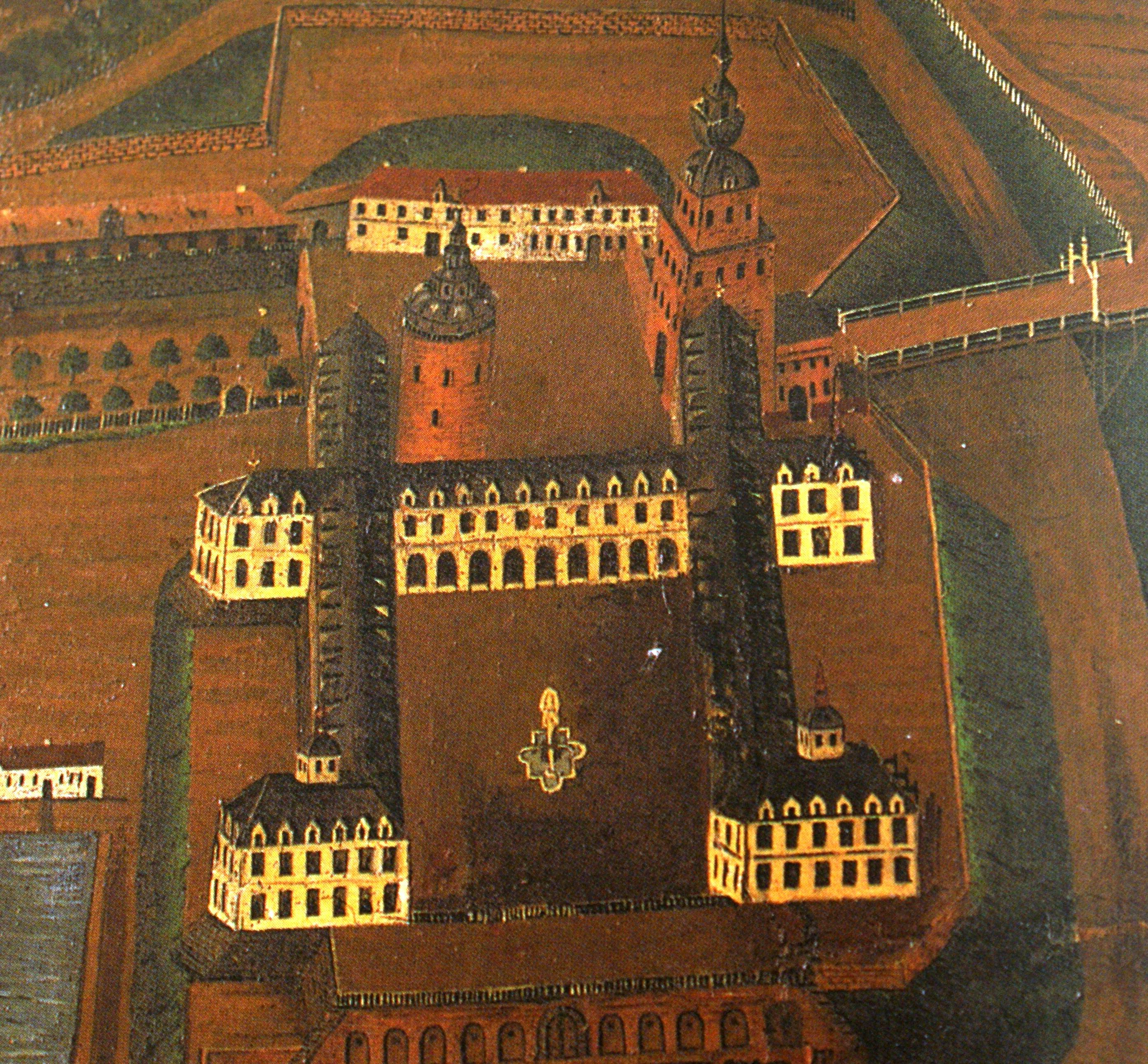
Lauenburg Castle at the end of the 16th century

In 1296 the duchy of Saxe-Lauenburg was partitioned from Saxony (the other part becoming Saxe-Wittenberg), which persisted until the 19th century. Lauenburg served as the ducal capital until 1616, when the castle burnt down. In 1619 the capital was moved to Ratzeburg. The area of the duchy was roughly coterminous with today's district. From 1689 the duchy was in a personal union with Lüneburg-Celle, from 1705 Brunswick-Lüneburg (commonly known as Hanover) and from 1714 also Great Britain and Ireland.

During the Napoleonic Wars the area was briefly incorporated into the First French Empire as part of the Bouches-de-l'Elbe department. After the Napoleonic Wars Lauenburg was acquired by Prussia from Hanover in exchange for East Frisia; Prussia then ceded it to Denmark in exchange for its part of Pomerania (which had been Swedish Pomerania).

It remained in Danish hands until 1864 when they lost it in Treaty of Vienna following the Second Schleswig War. It entered a personal union with Prussia in 1865 and on 1 July 1876 it was incorporated into the Prussian Province of Schleswig-Holstein.

In medieval times Lauenburg was a waypoint on the Old Salt Route, while today it is the southern terminus of the Elbe-Lübeck Canal.

Between 1945 and 1982, Lauenburg served as a West German Inner German border crossing for cars travelling along Bundesstraße 5 between the Soviet Zone of occupation in Germany (until 1949, thereafter the East German Democratic Republic, or West Berlin) and the British zone of occupation (until 1949 and thereafter the West German Federal Republic of Germany). The traffic was subject to the Interzonal traffic regulations that between West Germany and West Berlin followed the special regulations of the Transit Agreement (1972).

== Culture and sights ==
Lauenburg has many historic buildings from the 17th century and earlier. These include houses, which were mostly the homes of sailors, and the Maria-Magdalenen Church, which was built in the 13th century.

The town is nestled at the bottom of 50 meter high bluffs. Narrow streets up the hill lead to the "upper town" where Lauenburg Castle is located. Lauenburg Castle, the former residence of the Dukes of Lauenburg and the political centre of their Dukedom, the majority of which has since been destroyed, with only the old castle tower remaining. Currently, the castle serves as city and municipal administration. To the south of the city lies the Elbe and Lower-Saxony, which used to belong to the duchy until it was ceded to the then neighbouring Kingdom of Hanover in 1814.

Lauenburg also has the "Palmschleuse", a historic river lock, originally built in 1398 and renewed in the 17th century. It is the oldest of its kind in Europe.

== Notable residents ==
=== Rulers ===
- Bernard II, Duke of Saxe-Lauenburg (1385/1392–1463), ruler
- Clara of Saxe-Lauenburg (1518–1576), a Princess of Saxe-Lauenburg
- Eric I, Duke of Saxe-Lauenburg-Ratzeburg (c. 1280–1360), ruler
- Eric II, Duke of Saxe-Lauenburg-Ratzeburg (1318/20–1368), ruler
- Eric IV, Duke of Saxe-Lauenburg (1354–1411), ruler
- Eric V, Duke of Saxe-Lauenburg (died 1436), ruler
- John V, Duke of Saxe-Lauenburg (1439–1507), ruler, reconstructed Lauenburg Castle

=== Others (in date order) ===
- Karl Ludwig Harding (1765–1834), astronomer
- Samuel Peter Schilling (1773–1852), entomologist
- Mathilde Block (1850–1932), painter, embroiderer
- Otto von Moltke (1851–1881), German-Danish military officer
- Jürgen Plagemann (1936–2026), rower, won Olympic silver in 1964
- Dirk Schreyer (1944–2025), rower, won Olympic gold in 1968
- Norbert Brackmann (born 1954), German CDU politician, member of the Bundestag from 2009 to 2021

== International relations ==
Lauenburg is twinned with:

- Boizenburg (Germany)
- Dudelange (Luxembourg)
- Lębork (Poland) (formerly Lauenburg in Pommern)
- Manom (France)
