= War Commemorative Medal of 1870–1871 =

War Commemorative Medal of 1870–1871 Kriegsdenkmünze für die Feldzüge 1870–1871
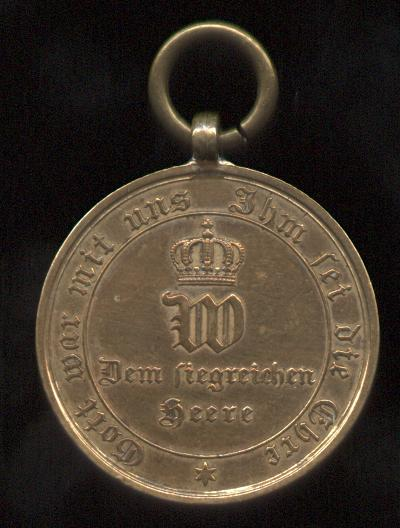
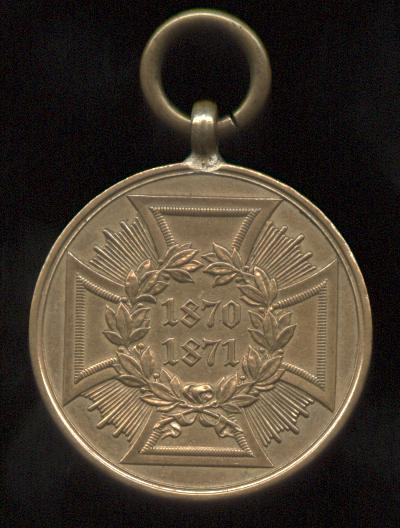
- Obverse and reverse of the medal
- Type: Campaign medal
- Awarded for: Service as a combatant or non-combatant
- Eligibility: German soldiers and civilians
- Campaign: Franco-Prussian War
- Established: 20 May 1871
- Ribbon bar of the medal

The War Commemorative Medal of 1870–1871 (German: Kriegsdenkmünze für die Feldzüge 1870–1871) is a campaign medal presented by Kaiser William I in his capacity as King of Prussia. The medal was presented to commemorate service in the Franco Prussian War. The medal was presented to members of the united German armies. The medal was presented for combat service in bronze, and non-combat service in steel. Each version bore minor differences in inscription and design. Clasps were authorized on the 25th anniversary of the German victory, to commemorate selected battles.

== Criteria ==
The war medal was presented to officers, military physicians, civil servants and men of the German armies who took part in the Franco-Prussian war through 2 March 1871. It was also awarded to the crew of the SMS Augusta for service from 11 December 1870 to 2 March 1871.

== Appearance ==
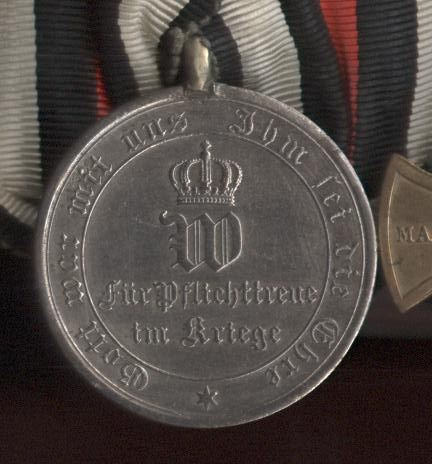
Non-combatant version (obverse)

The medal for combatants was manufactured from captured bronze cannon barrels. The obverse shows the crowned Royal cypher of William I over the inscription Dem siegreichen Heere (To the victorious army). Inscribed around the edge is Gott war mit uns, Ihm sei die Ehre (God was with us, to Him be the glory). The reverse shows a cross with rays between the four arms. In the center of the cross is a laurel wreath surrounding the dates 1870 and 1871. On the edge of the medallion is inscribed AUS EROBERTEM GESCHUETZ (From conquered cannon).

The medal for non-combatants is made of steel. It follows a similar design with only minor deviations. The center inscription on the obverse is Für Pflichttreue im Kriege (For devotion to duty in the war). On the reverse the wreath on the cross is of oak leaves.

== Clasps ==
To commemorate the 25th anniversary of victory, clasps were authorized to be worn on the medal on 18 August 1895. The clasps were only allowed to be worn on combatant medals by front line soldiers. The clasps are 6 mm high and 32–39 mm wide and were made of gilt bronze or brass. They are as follows:

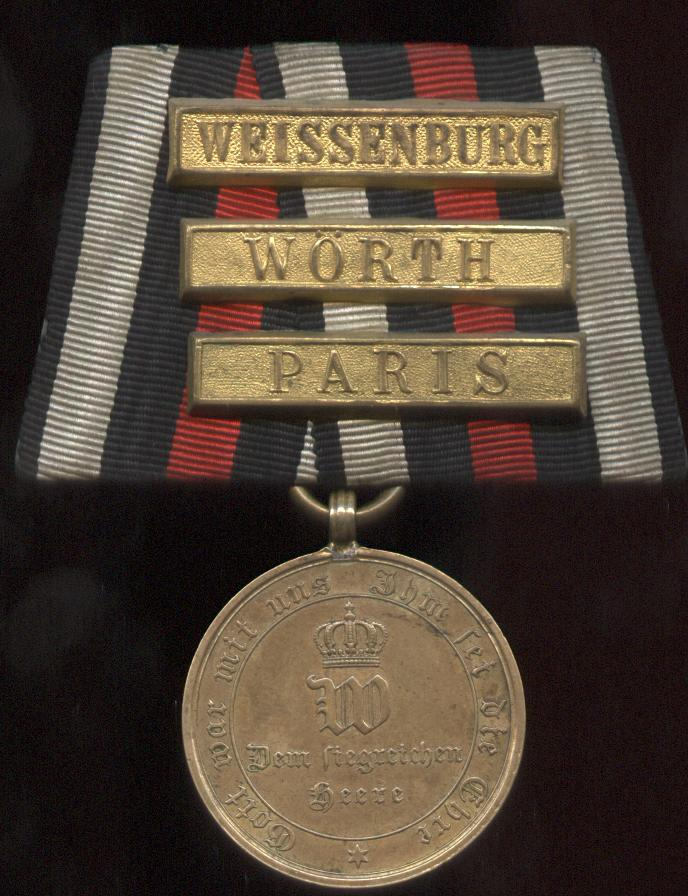
Combatant medal with three clasps

- Amiens
- A. Mont Valerien
- An Der Lisaine
- An Der Hallue
- Beaumont
- Beaune La Rolande
- Beaugency-Cravant
- Bapaume
- Belfort
- Colombey-Nouilly
- Gravelotte-St.Privat
- Loigny-Poupry
- Le Mans
- Metz
- Noisseville
- Orleans
- Paris
- Spichern
- Sedan
- Strassburg
- St. Quentin
- Vionville-Mars La Tour
- Villiers
- Wörth
- Wissenburg

== Reuse of the Design ==
The reverse of the medal, with dates "1914-1918", but without rays, was used as the obverse of The Honour Cross of the World War 1914/1918. The German government awarded this to participants, or surviving family members, for service in the First World War. The same ribbon colour scheme was also used.
