= Old Salt Route =

Medieval trade route in northern Europe

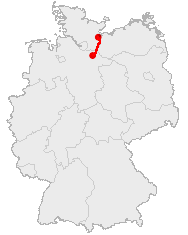
Map: Old Salt Route

The Old Salt Route was a medieval trade route in Northern Germany, one of the ancient network of salt roads which were used primarily for the transport of salt and other staples. In Germany it was referred to as Alte Salzstraße.

Salt was very valuable and essential at that time; it was sometimes referred to as "white gold." The vast majority of the salt transported on the road was produced from brine near Lüneburg, a city in the northern central part of the country and then transported to Lübeck, a major seaport on Germany's Baltic Sea coast.

== History ==
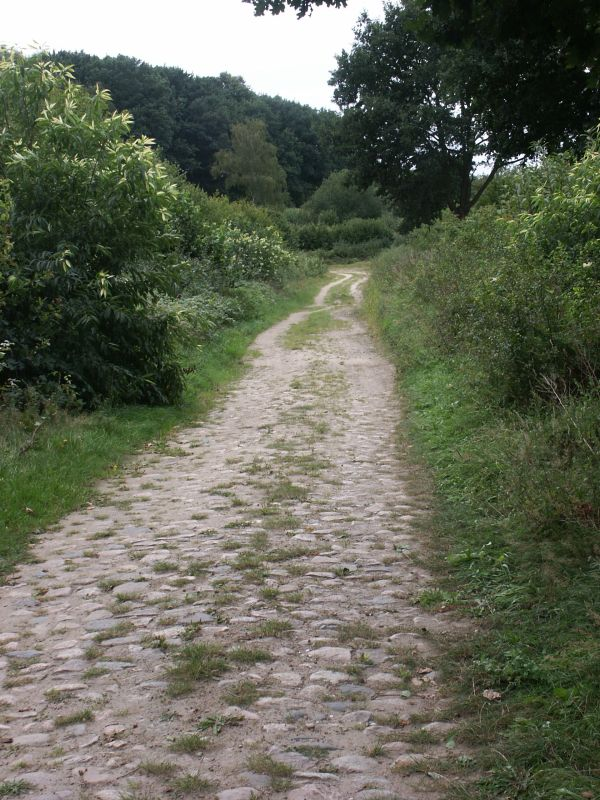
Old Salt Route: historical pavement near Breitenfelde

Historians generally recognize the Old Salt Route as part of a much longer path, which functioned as an important connection between the northern and southern reaches of the country. One of the oldest documents that confirms Lüneburg and its role in refining and transporting salt dates from 956 A.D. According to that document, King Otto I the Great granted the St. Michaelis Monastery in Lüneburg the customs revenue from the saltworks. Even at those early times, the city's wealth was based in large part on the salt found in the area. The Old Salt Route attained its peak of success between the 12th and the 16th century.

The trade route led from Lüneburg northward to Lübeck. From that port city, most of the salt was shipped to numerous destinations that also lie on the Baltic Sea, including Falsterbo, which boasted a Scania Market. There it was used for the preservation of herring, an immensely important food in the Middle Ages, as well as for other foods. The salt trade was a major reason for the power of Lübeck and the Hanseatic League.

== Transport of salt ==
Horse-drawn carts brought the salt from Lüneburg to a crossing of the Elbe river at Artlenburg (near Lauenburg) and from there, via Mölln, to Lübeck. For the most part, however, the historic trade route was composed of unsurfaced, sandy and often muddy roads through heathland, woods and small villages, making the transport of salt an arduous task. In addition, the route was somewhat dangerous, since the valuable cargo attracted thieves, bandits and marauders. The dangers faced by those who make the long trek and the fact that only relatively small quantities of the precious crystalline substance could be carried in any single journey, made moving salt via overland routes very expensive.

In 1398, though, the Stecknitz Canal, one of the first manmade waterways in Europe, was completed, making it possible to transport much more salt in a single shipment and to do so with much greater ease and safety. That change helped merchants satisfy the salt requirements of an ever-growing demand. In the 16th century, for example, about 19,000 tons of the product were carried from Lüneburg to Lübeck each year either by land or water. However, it still took about twenty days to complete each trip.

== Tourism ==
In modern times, a trip along the Salt Road promises a rich blend of nature and culture. The trip can be made on foot or on bicycle and part of the distance can also be enjoyed on a paddle-wheeled steamer. There are many fascinating sights along the old trade route. These points of interest include the historical towns Lüneburg, Mölln and Lübeck, which are highlighted by beautiful façades and little alleyways, and are a major attraction to visitors.

=== Bicycle route ===
As a bicycle route, there are the options of a main and a scenic route. The shorter main route (95 km) leads bicyclists through many picturesque little towns such as Lauenburg, Büchen, Mölln and Krummsee and also passes by the Lüne Monastery. The scenic route is especially attractive for nature lovers. The 106-kilometre-long (66-mile) path diverges from the main thoroughfare at Witzeeze, continues on through the Lauenburg Nature Park and rejoins the main route just before Lübeck.

=== Lüneburg Heath ===
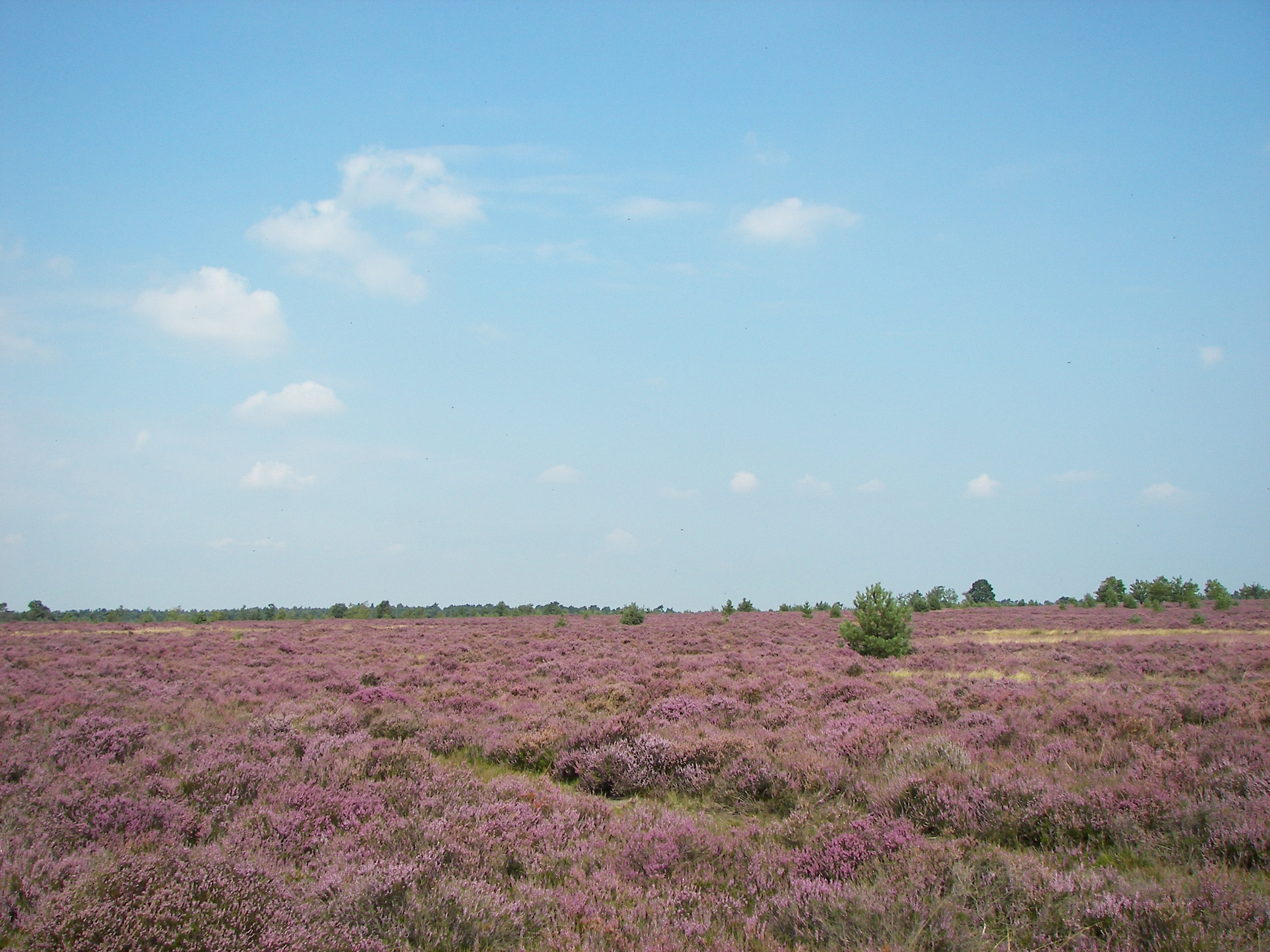
The Lüneburg Heath

Once, the area around Lüneburg was covered in lush woodlands. But because the medieval salt works depended on wood as a fuel used in boiling and purifying the saline water from which the salt was obtained, much of the forest was cut down. Heather then covered area, helping it to become a landscape that now attracts thousands of visitors when that foliage is in full bloom.

== See also ==
- German Salt Museum
- Lüneburg Saltworks
- Sülze Saltworks
