= Stecknitz =

Location
- Country: Germany
- State: Schleswig-Holstein

Physical characteristics
- Mouth
  - location: Trave
  - coordinates: 53.8457°N 10.6518°E

Basin features
- Progression: Trave→ Baltic Sea

Stecknitz (German pronunciation: [ˈʃtɛknɪts]) is a river of Schleswig-Holstein, Germany. It is a tributary of the Trave near Lübeck. For much of its length it forms part of the Elbe-Lübeck Canal.

== See also ==
- List of rivers of Schleswig-Holstein
