= Hospital of the Holy Spirit =

Former hospital in Germany

Coordinates: 53°52′17″N 10°41′24″E

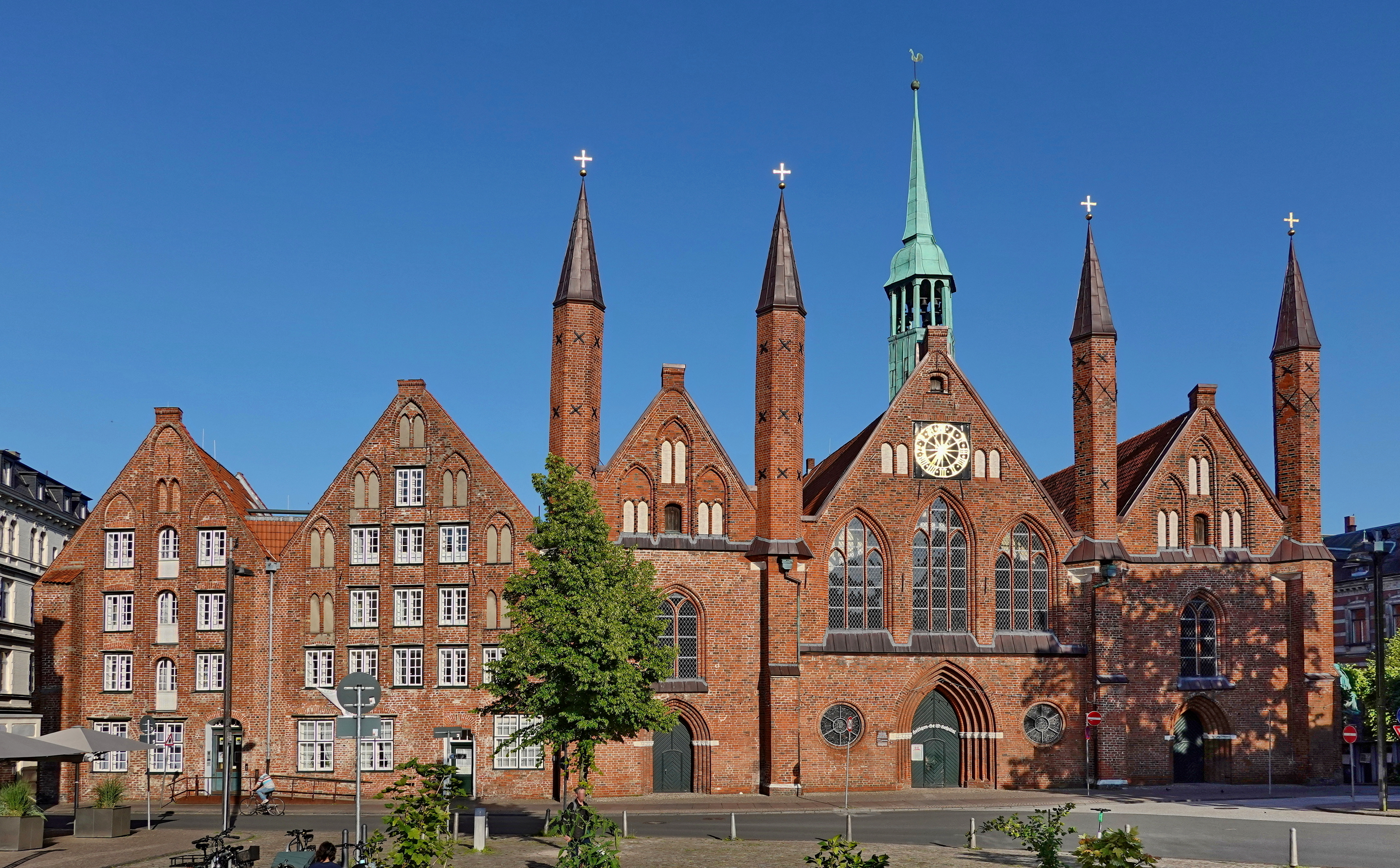
The Hospital of the Holy Spirit in 2024

The Hospital of the Holy Spirit (German: Heiligen-Geist-Hospital) is a former hospital in Lübeck, Schleswig-Holstein, Germany.

== Description ==
Today, the building serves as a retirement and nursing home which belongs to a foundation under public law and is administered in trust by the Hanseatic City of Lübeck. Built in 1286, it is one of the oldest existing social institutions in the world and considered a precursor to modern hospitals.

The retirement home was threatened with permanent closure in 2023, but this was averted.
