= Technical University of Applied Sciences Lübeck =

University in Lübeck, Germany

Coordinates: 53°50′13″N 10°41′55″E

Technische Hochschule Lübeck (THL) is a technical university of applied sciences located in the hanseatic city of Lübeck in northern Germany. The university was renamed in 2018 and was formerly known as “Fachhochschule Lübeck (FHL)” respectively "Lübeck University of Applied Sciences”. There are 43 degree programs, with 26 Bachelor's degree programs and 17 Master's degree programs. 4937 students are studying at the university, including 1549 women (as of Winter Semester 2023).

Technische Hochschule Lübeck Logo new

== International collaborations ==
The university's electrical engineering program has had an exchange program with the Milwaukee School of Engineering (MSOE) since 1995. There are international partnerships in industrial and mechanical engineering. Recently, it has worked with MSOE to develop a MIS exchange program. It also collaborates and has exchange programs with other universities in the United States, as well as with universities in China, Denmark, Finland, France, Ghana, Ireland, Latvia, Spain, and Sweden. Currently there are also more than 70 Exchange Students from East China University of Science and Technology, Shanghai participating in Environmental Engineering and Electrical Engineering. Further, 5 to 7 students qualify themselves to enroll IFIM Business School, Bangalore, India, and 6 to 8 students of the counterpart school come as a part of yearly exchange program.

== Department of Applied Natural Sciences ==
- Applied Chemistry, B.Sc. (German)
- Biomedical Engineering, M.Sc. (English)
- Biomedical Engineering, B.Sc. (German)
- Medical Microtechnology, M.Sc. (English)
- Audiological Acoustics, B.Sc. (German)
- Auditory Technology, M.Sc. (German)
- Physical Technology, B.Sc. (German)
- Regulatory Affairs, M.Sc. (German)
- Technical Biochemistry, M.Sc. (German)
- Environmental Engineering and - Management, B.Sc. (German)

== Department of Architecture and Civil Engineering ==
- Architecture, B.A. and M.A. (German)
- Civil Engineering, B. Eng. and M.Eng. (German)
- Urban Planning, B.Sc. (German)
- Urban Design and Planning, M.A. (German)
- Sustainable Building Technology, B.Eng. (German)
- Water Engineering, M.Eng. (English)

== Department of Electrical Engineering and Computer Science ==
- Applied Information Technology, M.Sc. (English/German)
- Electrical Engineering -
  - General Electrical Engineering, B.Sc.
  - Energy Systems and Automation Eng., B.Sc.
  - Communication Systems, B.Sc.
- Computer Science/Software Engineering
- Computer Science/Software Engineering for Distributed Systems, M.Sc.
- Information Technology and Design, B.Sc.
- IT Security Online, B.Sc.
- Computer Science and Media Applications - online studies, B.Sc./M.Sc.
- Renewable Energies Online, B.Sc.

== Department of Mechanical Engineering and Business Administration ==
- Business Administration, B.Sc.* and M.A.
- Mechanical Engineering, B.Sc. (incl. dual studies Mechanical Engineering)
- Mechanical Engineering, M.Sc. (English)
- Business Administration and Engineering, B.Sc. and M.Sc.
- Business Administration and Engineering (online), B.Eng.
- Business Administration and Engineering – Food Industry, B.Eng.
