= St Peter's Church, Lübeck =

Church in Lübeck, Germany

Coordinates: 53.8658°N 10.6833°E

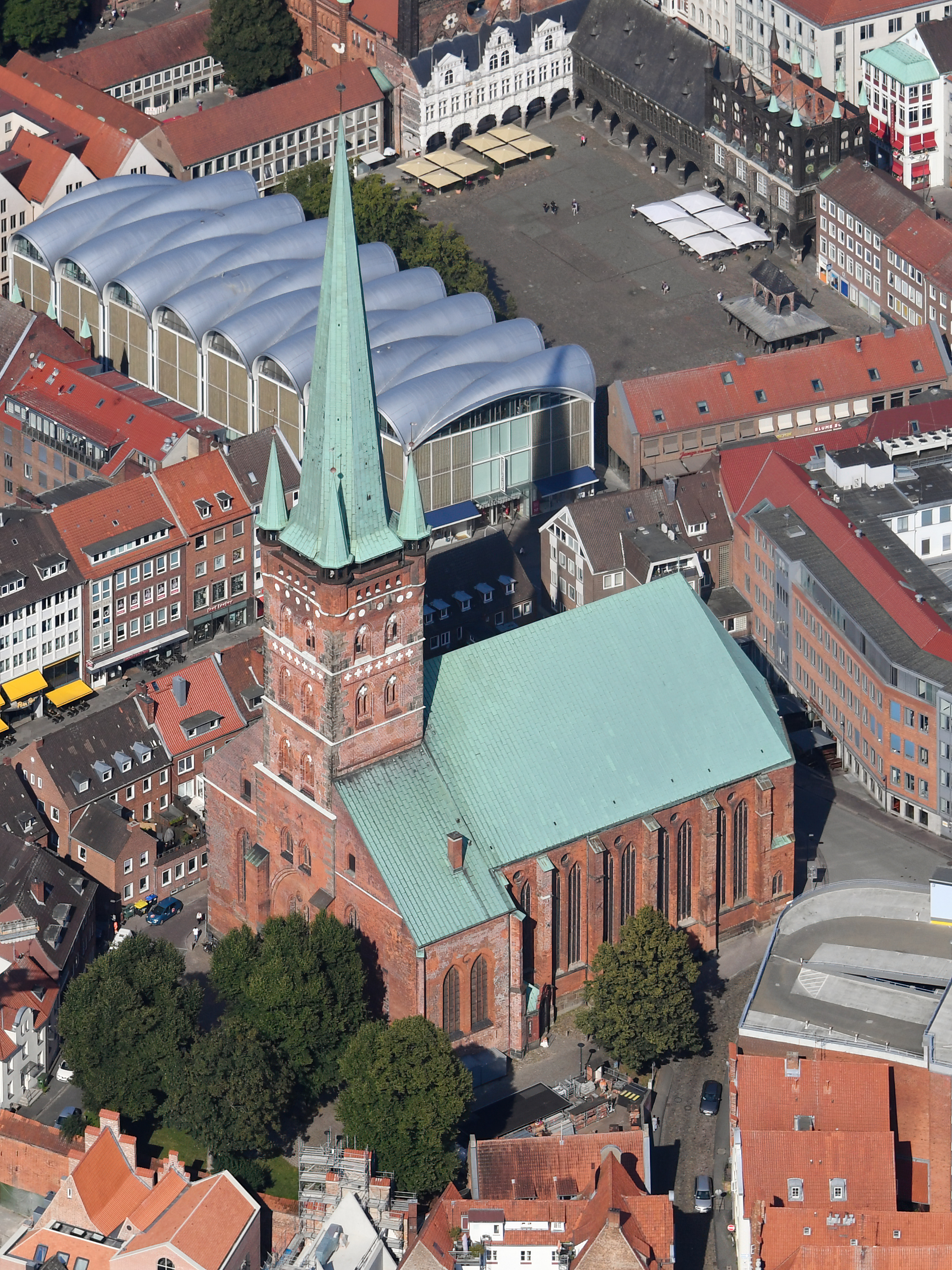

St. Peter's Church (Deutsch: St. Petri zu Lübeck) is a place of worship in Lübeck, Germany, that was first mentioned in 1170. Over the centuries, it was rebuilt several times until construction of the church was completed in the 15th century. During the Second World War, St. Petri suffered severe damage and the restoration was not completed until 1987. Since the furnishings could not be restored, only special services take place in the church. As a city church without a congregation, it is mainly used for cultural and religious events as well as art exhibitions.

The effect of the simple space of the five-aisled hall church is very well emphasized by the special architecture. Modern works of art such as the altar cross by the Austrian artist Arnulf Rainer and the illuminated neon cross by Hanna Jäger invite visitors to think.

== History ==
The church was first mentioned together with the Marienkirche in as early as 1170. A late Romanesque, three-aisled church hall with four bays and three apses was built between 1227 and 1250. It was 29.80 m + 3 m long and 21 m wide. A three-aisled, Gothic hall choir was built around 1290. St. Petri was the imperial church of Lübeck. At the same time, the Petrikirche was Lübeck's second market church alongside the Marienkirche. In the 15th century it was expanded to its current appearance: a Gothic, five-aisled hall brick church with five bays. This made St. Peter's Church one of the few five-aisled churches in existence. There are three apses in the east and a single tower on a wide substructure in the west. The Reformation came to Lübeck in 1529/30, and St. Peter's Church became Protestant. During the air raid on Lübeck on Palm Sunday 1942, the Petrikirche burned down completely. The roof, the spire and the rich interior decoration were destroyed. This also included the organ front, created by the carver Tönnies Evers the Younger, and the important brass gravestone of the councilor John Kliingenberg. The baroque baptismal font of the church, donated by the councilor Johann Philipp Lefèvre, was preserved.

== Reconstruction after 1945 ==
The church initially served as a lapidarium for the Lübeck Kirchbauhütte, in which salvaged sculptural fragments from all of Lübeck's war-damaged churches were temporarily stored.

The exterior of St. Peter's was renovated in the 1960s. The tower was reerected in 1961. The interior of the church was restored in 1987. Given the complete destruction of the historical inventory, it was not reconstructed. Instead a simple, whitewashed room was created, including some modern artworks, such as the altar cross by the Austrian artist Arnulf Rainer and the illuminated neon cross by Hanna Jäger.

== Organ ==
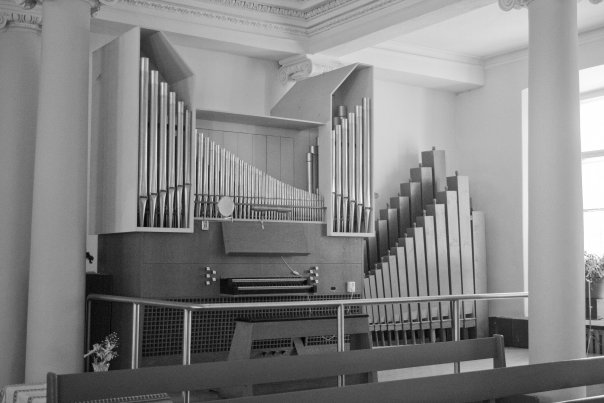

In 1992, the Petrikirche received a new organ, financed through donations from the foundation. The instrument is situated in the north aisle and was constructed by the organ building company, Hinrich Otto Paschen, based in Kiel. It features 19 registers (stops) across two manuals and a pedal. Both the playing action and the register action are mechanical. The organ console is connected to the positiv. The organist sits with his or her back to the Hauptwerk and looks over the positiv to see the conductor and the congregation.
