= Werner Huno =

Werner Huno (died 1291 in Lübeck) was a German merchant and councilor of the Hanseatic city of Lübeck.

== Life ==
Nothing is known about Werner Huno's origins. As head of the Heiligen-Geist-Hospital in Lübeck, he concluded contracts with the Lüneburg Saltworks in 1289/1290. He had been councilor of the city of Lübeck since 1289. For investment purposes, he acquired half the village of Wulfsdorf, half the village of Beidendorf and half the village of Albsfelde. Werner Huno lived in house Koberg 5 in Lübeck. After his death, his widow sold the halves of Wulfsdorf and Beidendorf to the Lübeck councilor Gottfried von Cremon.

While Emil Ferdinand Fehling looked at the Lübeck council secretary and chronicler Alexander Huno as his son, Friedrich Bruns later turned against this attribution.

== Bibliography ==
- Emil Ferdinand Fehling: Lübeckische Ratslinie. Lübeck 1925, Nr. 260
