= Lübeck =

City in Schleswig-Holstein, Germany

Lübeck Lübęk / Lübeek (Low German)
- City
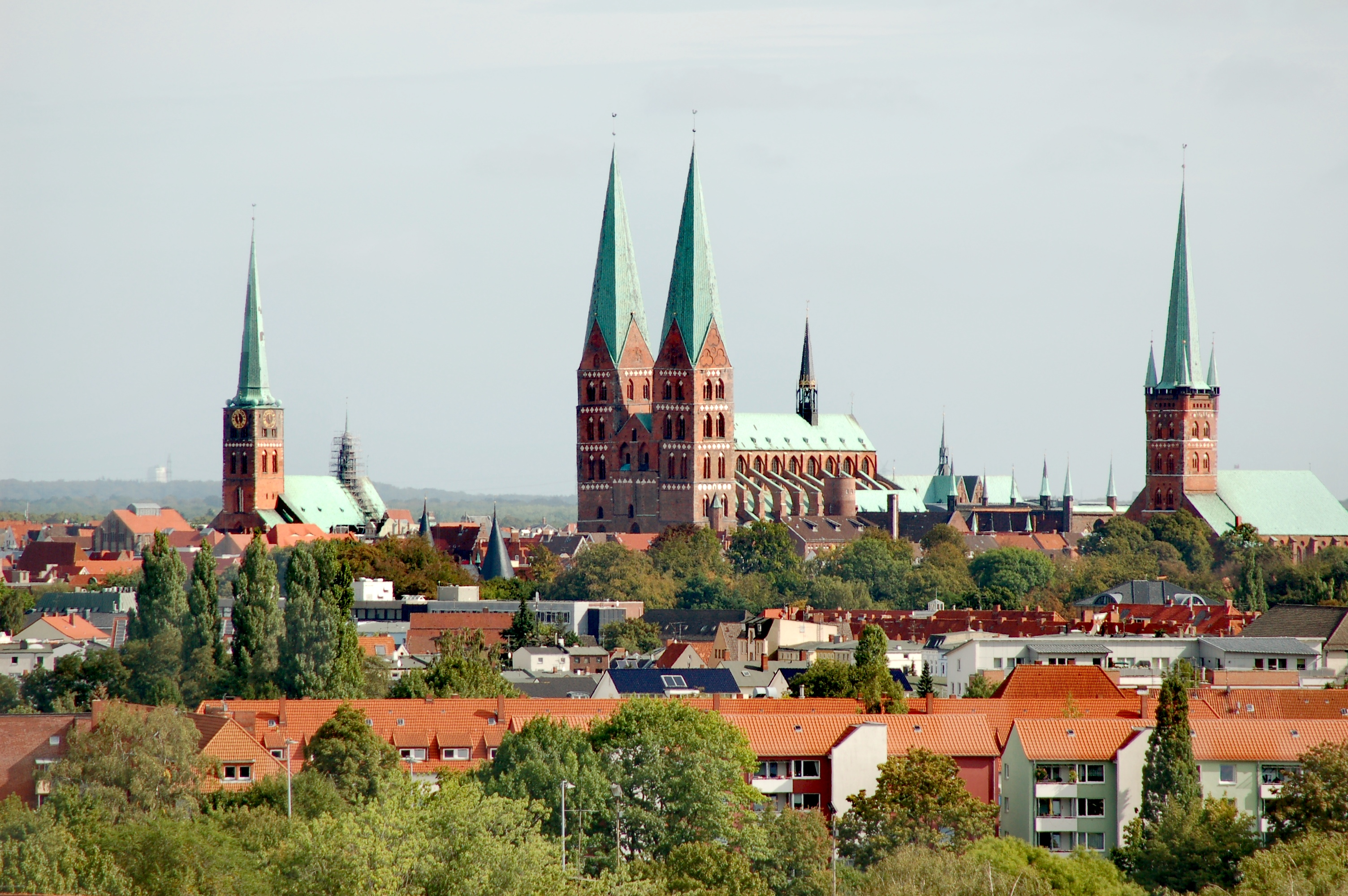
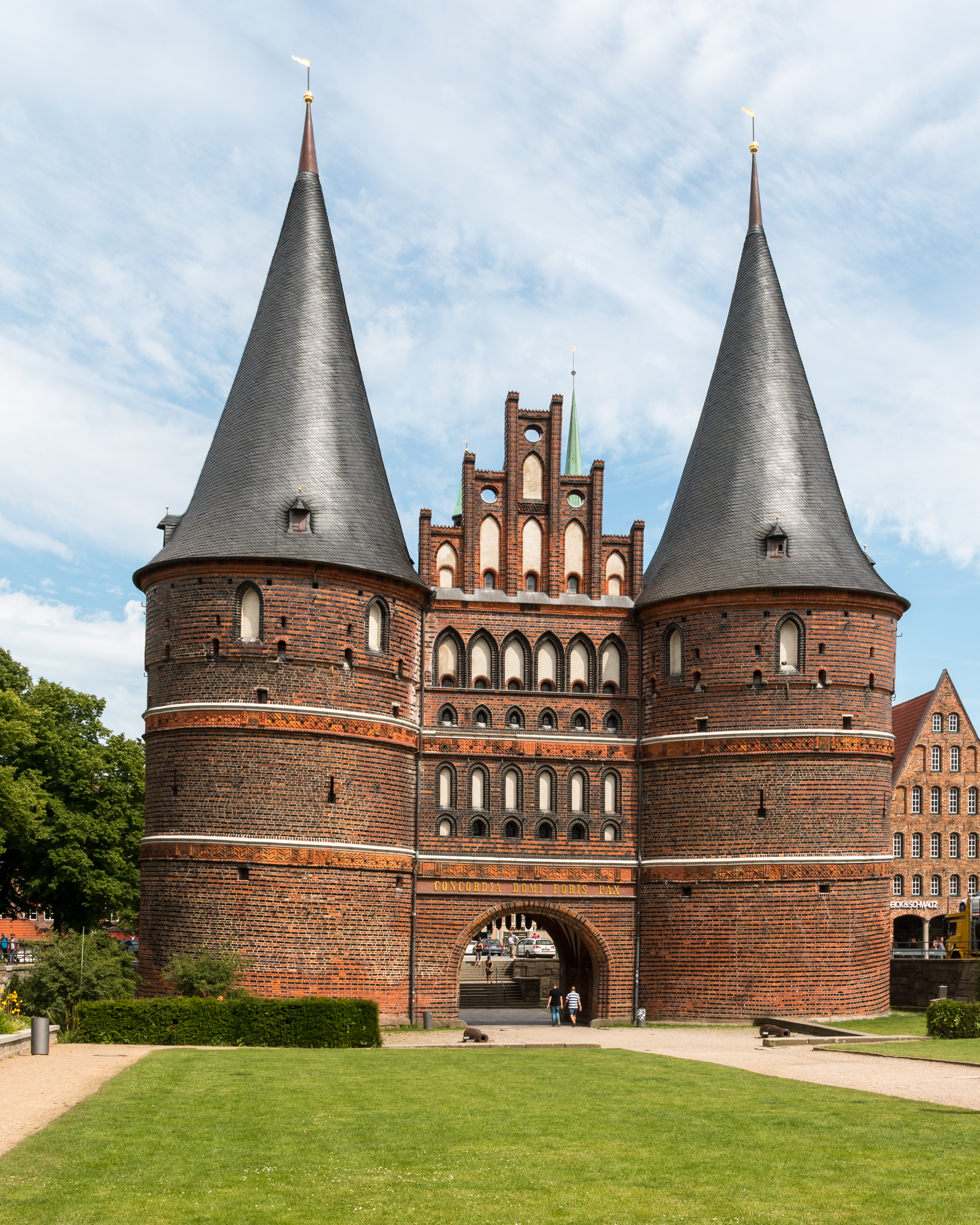
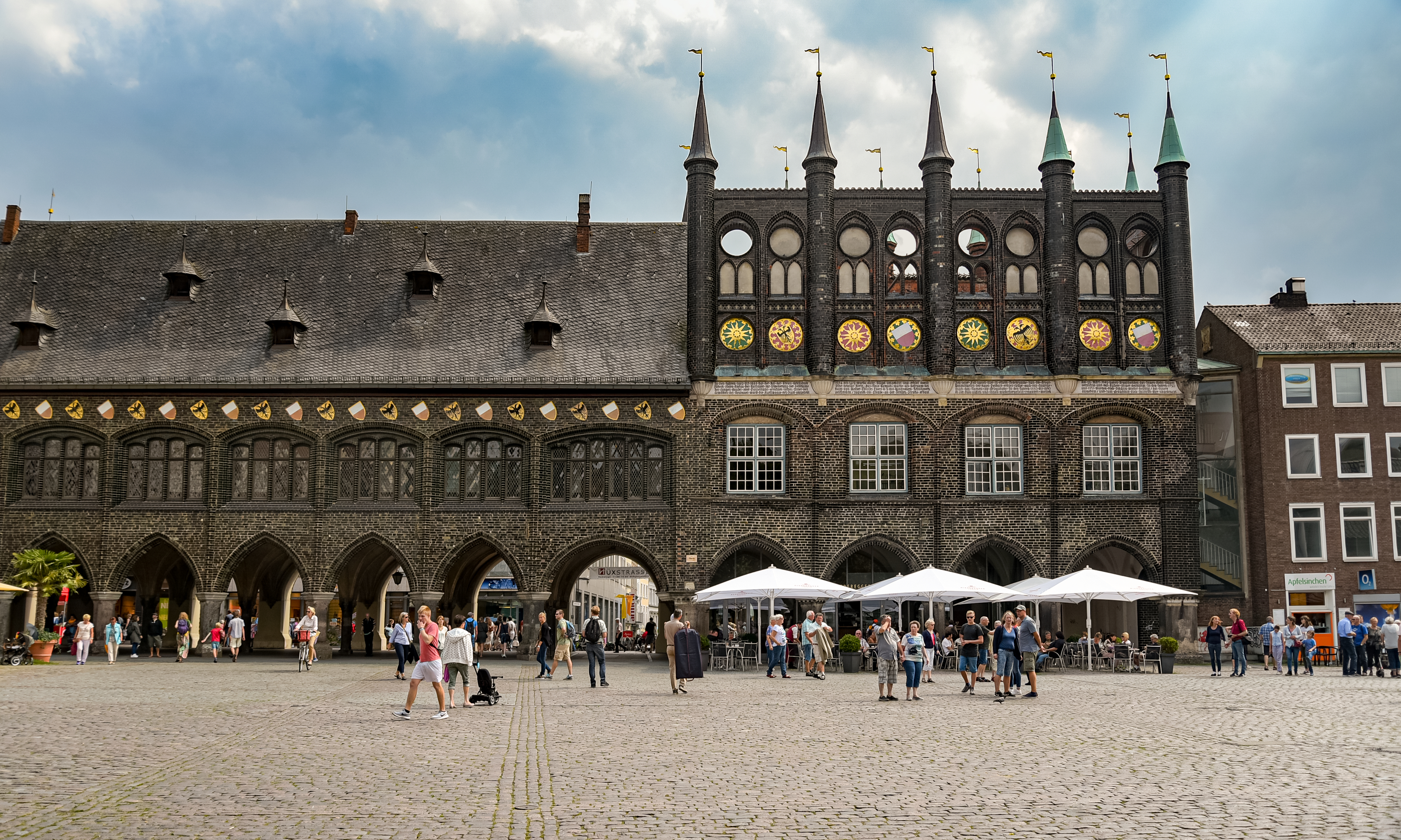
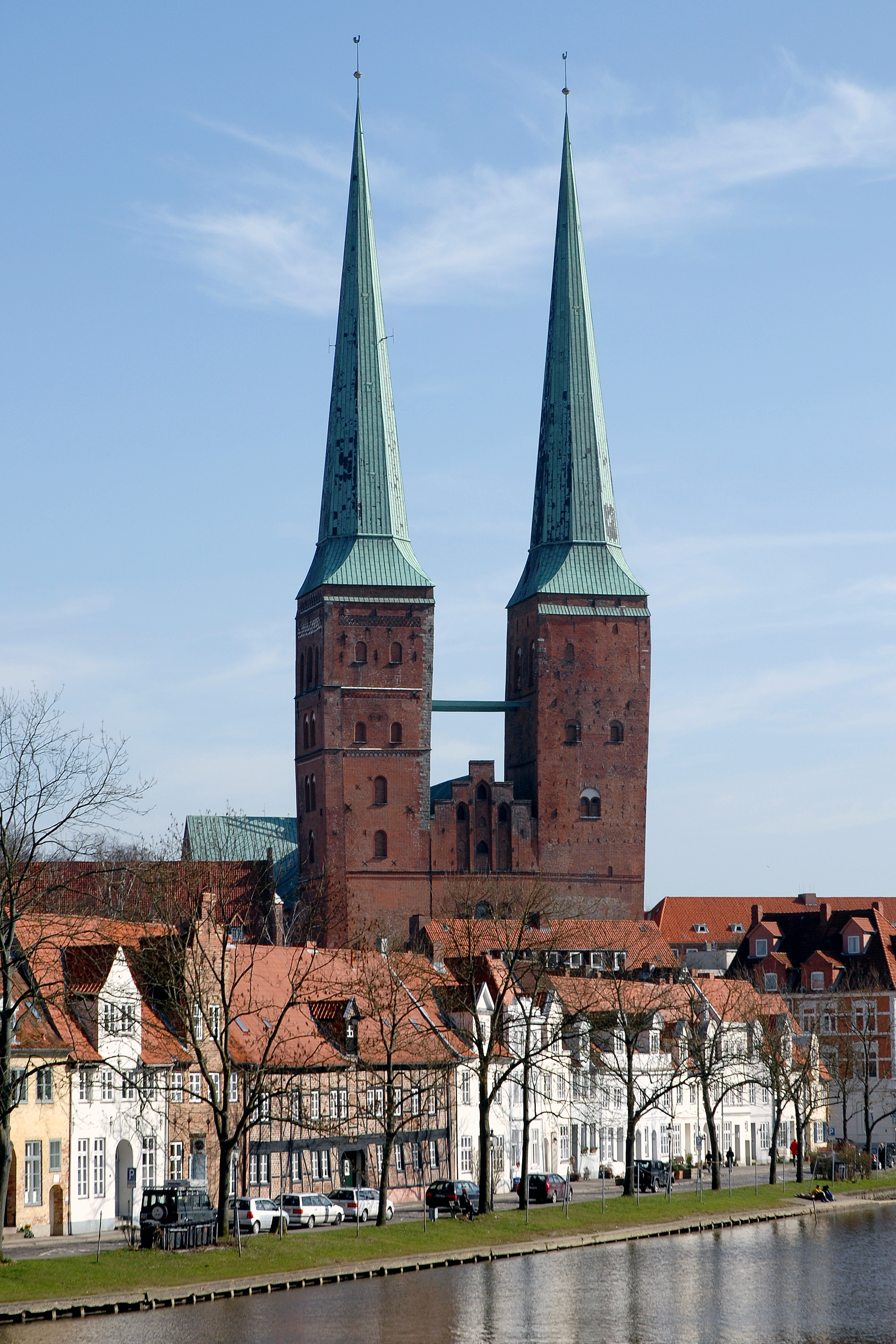
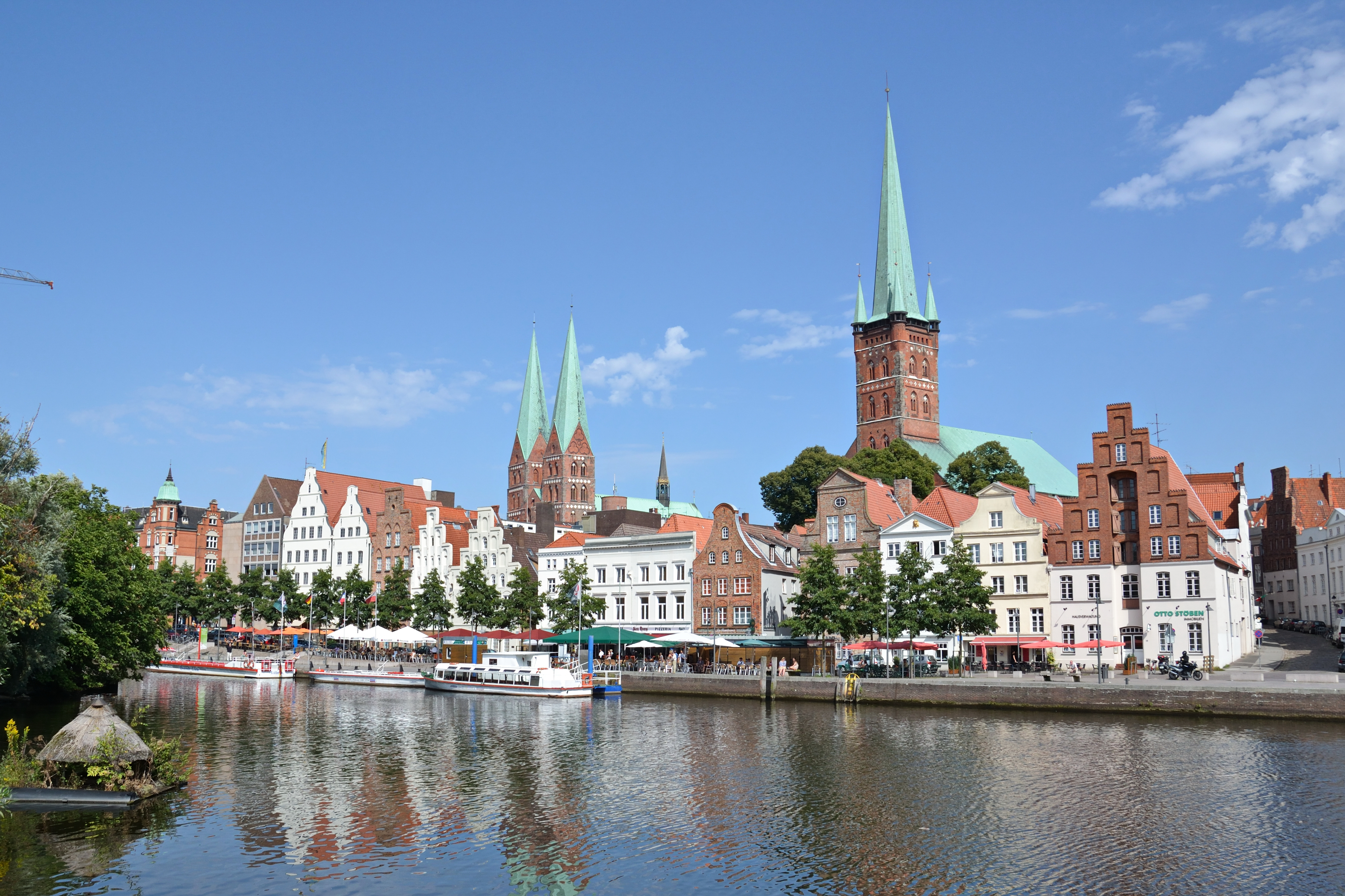
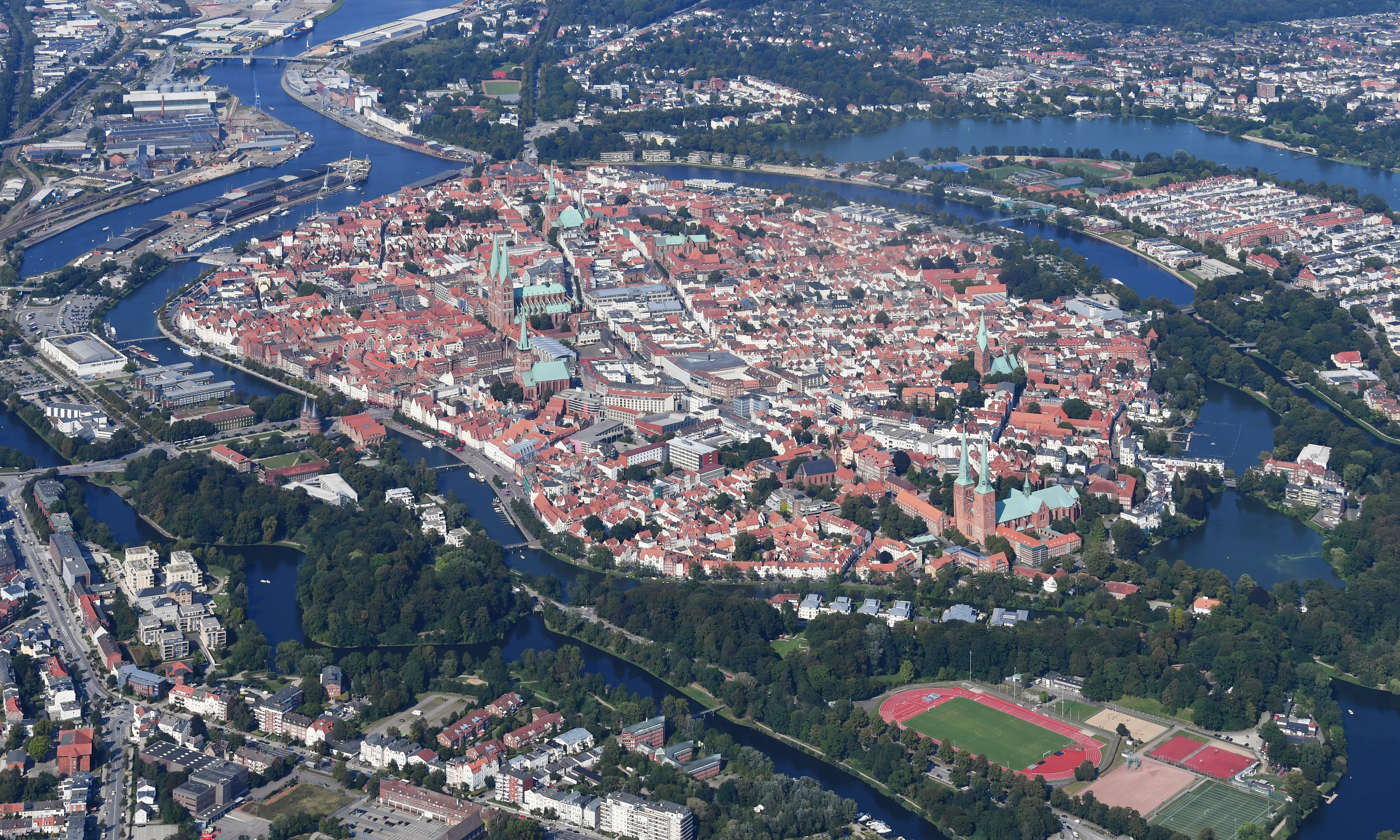
- St James', St Mary's and St Peter's Holsten Gate Lübeck City Hall Lübeck Cathedral An der Obertrave Aerial view of Lübeck

- Flag Coat of arms
- Interactive map of Lübeck
- Location within Germany Location within Schleswig-Holstein
- Coordinates: 53°52′11″N 10°41′11″E
- Country: Germany
- State: Schleswig-Holstein
- District: Urban district
- Subdivisions: 35 Stadtbezirke

Government
  - Mayor: Jan Lindenau (SPD)
  - Governing parties: SPD/ CDU

Area
  - Total: 214.13 km^{2} (82.68 sq mi)
- Elevation: 13 m (43 ft)

Population (2025-12-31)
  - Total: 217,061
  - Density: 1,013.7/km^{2} (2,625.4/sq mi)
- Time zone: UTC+01:00 (CET)
  - Summer (DST): UTC+02:00 (CEST)
- Postal codes: 23501−23570
- Dialling codes: 0451, 04502
- Vehicle registration: HL
- Website: www.luebeck.de

Hanseatic City of Lübeck
UNESCO World Heritage Site
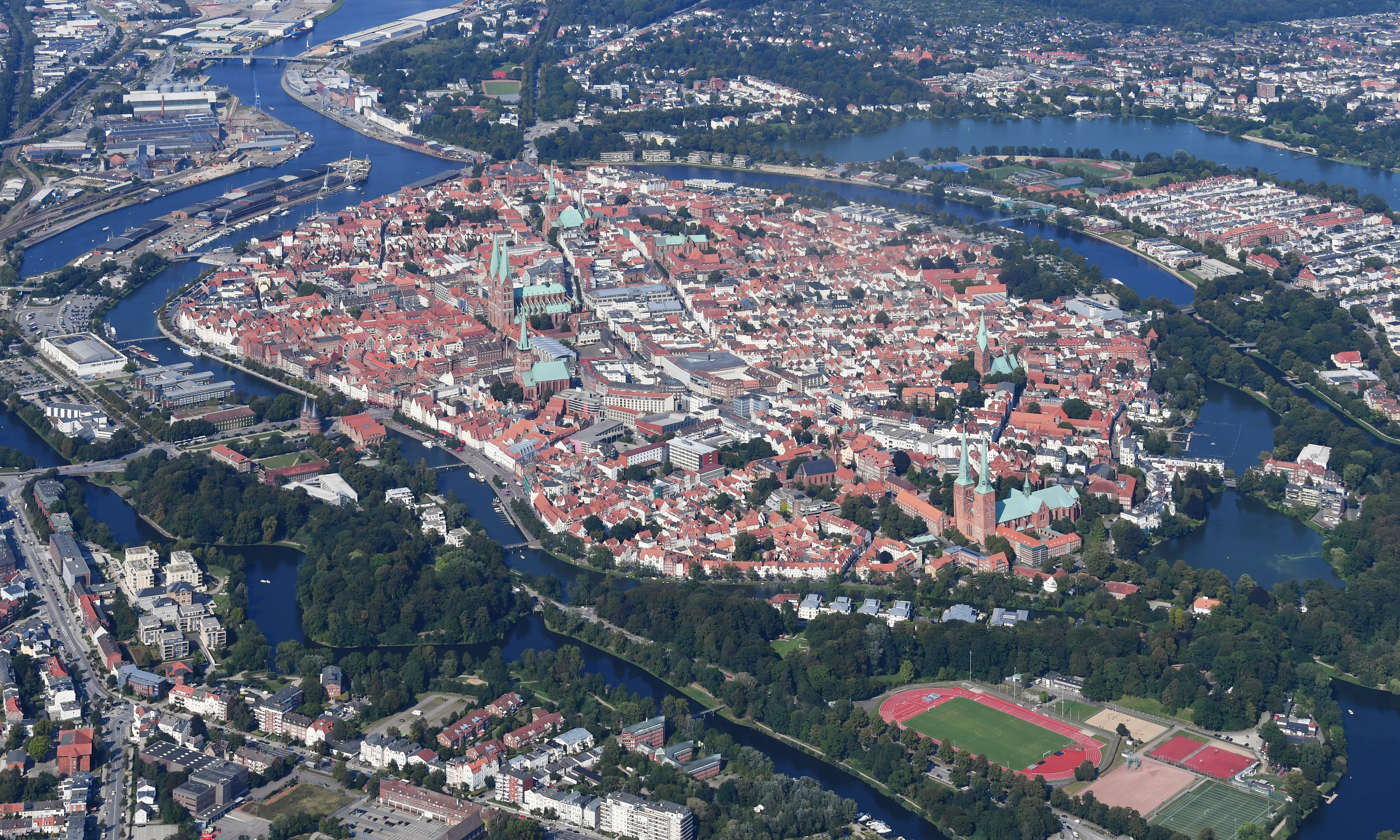
- Aerial view of the old town
- Interactive map of Hanseatic City of Lübeck
- Criteria: Cultural: iv
- Reference: 272
- Inscription: 1987 (11th Session)
- Area: 81.1 ha (200 acres)
- Buffer zone: 693.8 ha (1,714 acres)

Lübeck (German: [ˈlyːbɛk]; Low German: Lübęk or Lübeek [ˈlyːbeːk]; Latin: Lubeca), officially the Hanseatic City of Lübeck (German: Hansestadt Lübeck), is a city in Northern Germany. With around 220,000 inhabitants, it is the second-largest city on the German Baltic coast and the second-largest city in the state of Schleswig-Holstein, after its capital, Kiel. It is the 36th-largest city in Germany.

The city lies in the Holsatian part of Schleswig-Holstein, at the mouth of the Trave, which flows into the Bay of Lübeck in the borough of Travemünde, and on the Trave's tributary Wakenitz. The island with the historic old town and the districts north of the Trave are also located in the historical region of Wagria. Lübeck is the southwesternmost city on the Baltic Sea, and the closest point of access to the Baltic from Hamburg. The city lies in the Holsatian dialect area of Low German.

Before 819, Polabian Slavs founded a settlement which they called Liubice at the confluence of the Schwartau and the Trave. By the 10th century, Liubice was the second-most important settlement of the Obotrites after Starigard. Lübeck was granted Soest city rights in 1160, and, in 1260, it became an immediate city within the Holy Roman Empire. In the middle of the 12th century, Lübeck developed into the cradle of the Hanseatic League, of which it was considered the de facto capital and most important city from then on. The Lübeck law was eventually adopted by around 100 cities in the Baltic region. Lübeck preserved its status as an independent city, which it had held since 1226, until 1937.

Lübeck's historic old town, located on a densely built-up island, is Germany's most extensive UNESCO World Heritage Site. With six church towers surpassing 100 metres (330 ft), Lübeck has more such towers than any other city in the world. (Note: There are five churches taller than 100 metres (330 ft) in Hamburg and four in Lübeck, but two of the churches in Lübeck have two towers, and in Hamburg there are just five towers overall.) Nicknamed the "City of the Seven Towers" (Stadt der Sieben Türme), Lübeck's skyline is dominated by the seven towers of its five main Protestant churches: St Mary's, Lübeck Cathedral, St James', St Peter's, and St Giles's. The cathedral, constructed in various stages between 1173 and 1335, was the first large brickwork church in the Baltic region. St Mary's Church, built between 1265 and 1351, is considered the model on which most of the other Brick Gothic churches in the sphere of influence of the Hanseatic League are based. It is the second-tallest church with two main towers after Cologne Cathedral (which only surpassed it in 1880), has the tallest brick vault, and is the second-tallest brickwork structure after St. Martin's Church in Landshut.

Lübeck is home to the University of Lübeck with its University Medical Center Schleswig-Holstein, the Technical University of Applied Sciences Lübeck, and the Lübeck Academy of Music. There are 18 museums in Lübeck, among which are the European Hansemuseum, Lübeck Museum Port, and the Niederegger Marzipan Museum dedicated to the culinary specialty for which the city is best known, namely Lübeck Marzipan. Due to their southwestern location, Travemünde and the nearby seaside resorts of Niendorf, Timmendorfer Strand, Scharbeutz, Haffkrug, Sierksdorf, and Grömitz are among Germany's most visited seaside destinations.

Lübeck Main Station is located on the Vogelfluglinie railway line connecting continental Europe (Hamburg) to Scandinavia (Copenhagen) via the future Fehmarn Belt fixed link. The port of Lübeck is the second-largest German port on the Baltic Sea after the port of Rostock, and the Skandinavienkai in Travemünde is Germany's most important ferry port, with connections to Scandinavia and the Baltic countries. The city has its own regional airport at Lübeck-Blankensee, while nearby Hamburg Airport serves as Lübeck's main air hub.

== History ==
Archaeological investigations in southern Lübeck have found evidence of human activity from the end of the last Ice Age. The excavated area contains settlement remains from the Neolithic, Bronze Age, Iron Age and Roman period.

A Slavic fortification existed at Old Lübeck, near the confluence of the Schwartau and Trave, by 819. The settlement was first recorded under the name Liubice in 1072 and became a centre of the Obotrites before it was destroyed in 1138. The name is generally derived from a Slavic personal name such as Lub or Lubomir.

In 1143, Adolf II, Count of Schauenburg and Holstein, founded a new town on the river island of Bucu. A fire destroyed it in 1157, and Henry the Lion rebuilt it after acquiring the site from Adolf in 1159. Henry also transferred the bishopric from Oldenburg to Lübeck in 1160. After Henry was outlawed in 1181, the city came under Emperor Frederick Barbarossa, who confirmed its privileges. Lübeck law was later adopted by more than 100 towns around the Baltic.

=== Hanseatic city ===
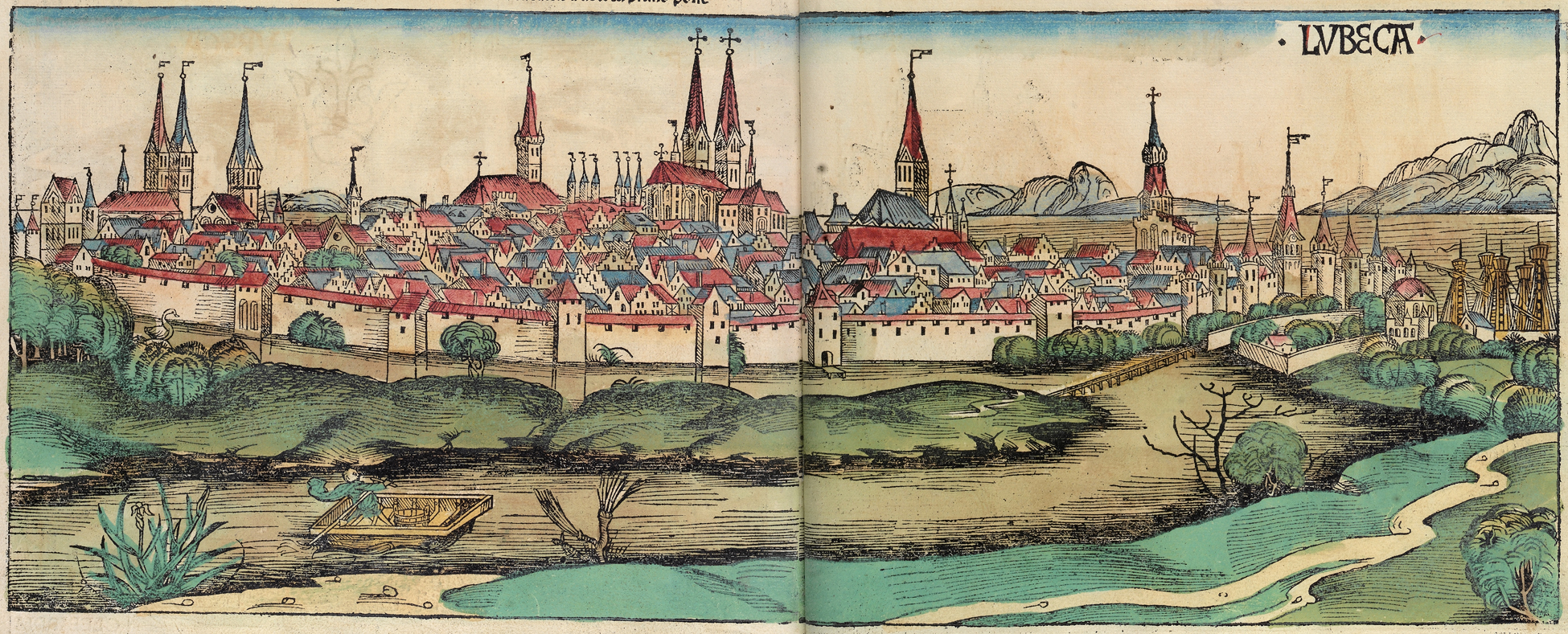
Lübeck as illustrated in the Nuremberg Chronicle, 1493

In 1226, Emperor Frederick II granted Lübeck Imperial immediacy, placing it directly under the emperor as the Free City of Lübeck. Lübeck lay on the trade routes between the North Sea and Baltic and became a centre of long-distance commerce. From the mid-13th century, other Low German towns asked it to represent their common interests. Lübeck became the leading city of the Hanseatic League.

Hanseatic diets met regularly in Lübeck from the mid-14th century. The league concluded the Peace of Stralsund in 1370, when its power in the Baltic was at its greatest. Lübeck's unsuccessful intervention in the Count's Feud of 1534 to 1536 was its last attempt to preserve its earlier dominance of Baltic trade.

=== Decline ===
The Hanseatic cities met less often as European trade shifted towards the Atlantic, and the Thirty Years' War interrupted their cooperation. Their last diet met in Lübeck in 1669. The league was never formally dissolved, and Lübeck, Hamburg and Bremen continued to use the title "Free and Hanseatic City".

=== From the Napoleonic Wars to the German Empire ===
French troops occupied neutral Lübeck after the Battle of Lübeck on 6 November 1806. The occupation restricted the long-distance trade on which the city depended. One commission recorded losses, another distributed supplies, and a committee of merchants raised loans. Lübeck was incorporated into the First French Empire in January 1811 and became the administrative seat of an arrondissement. French rule ended in December 1813.

The Congress of Vienna recognised Lübeck as a sovereign free city in 1815. It joined the German Confederation in 1815, the North German Confederation in 1866 and the German Empire in 1871.

During the nineteenth century, Lübeck remained an important Baltic trading port, even as its standing remained well below the level it had reached at the height of the Hanseatic League. Established merchant houses worked alongside smaller trading firms and workshops that served the harbour, its shops, and its counting houses.

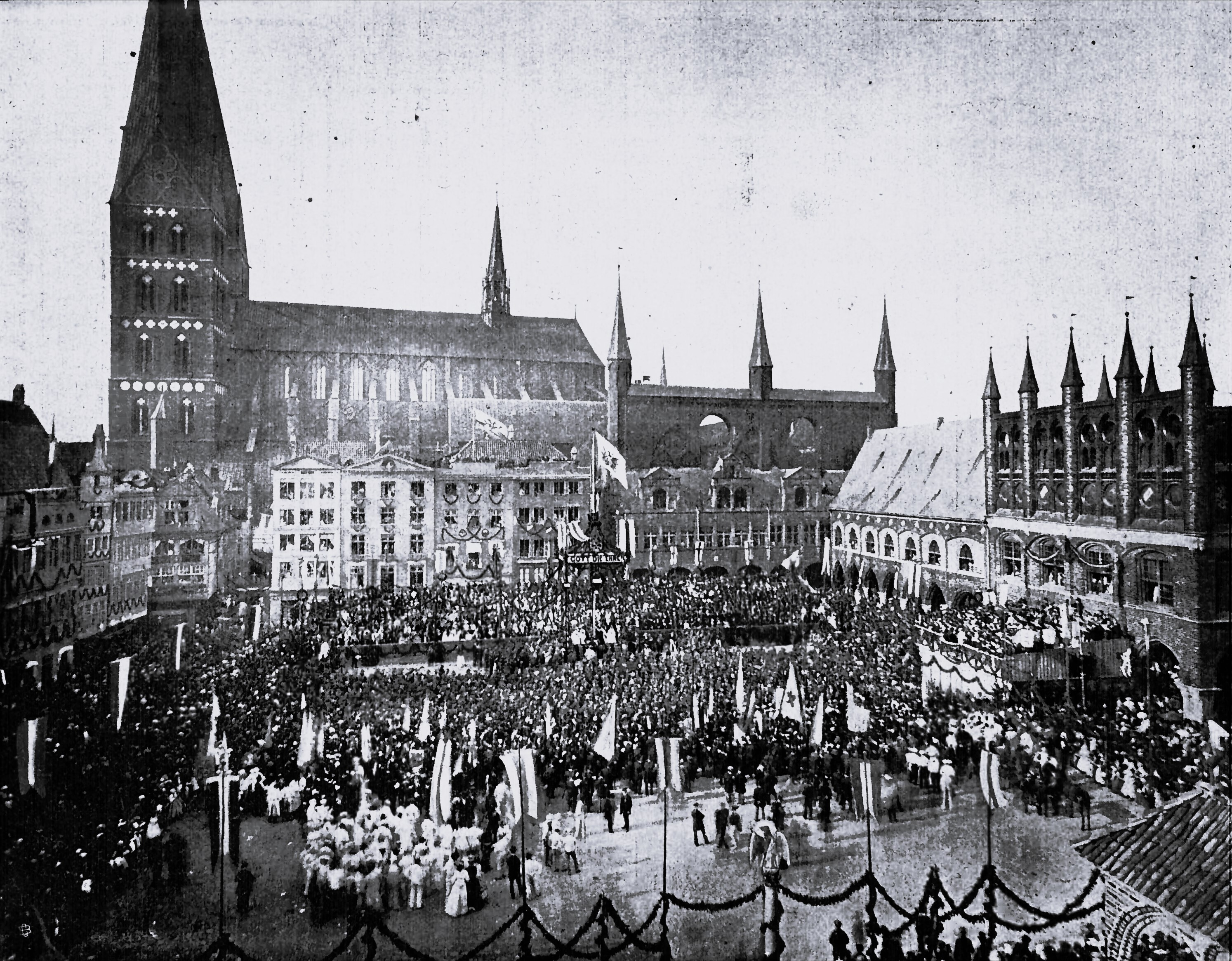
Entry of the Fusilier battalion into the city centre on 18 June 1871

The fusilier battalion of the 2nd Hanseatic Infantry Regiment No. 76 was stationed in Lübeck from 1867 and fought at the Battle of Loigny in December 1870. Its traditions passed to the 3rd Hanseatic Infantry Regiment No. 162 when that regiment was formed in 1897.

During the same period, Lübeck's cash offices handled the new imperial gold currency. In October 1877, an unusually large deposit led officials to reweigh 1,912 20-mark coins. Their closely clustered weights indicated deliberate reduction rather than ordinary wear and brought the Doppelkronensache to light.

The Elbe-Lübeck Canal was completed in 1900, and the Herrenwyk ironworks was founded in 1906.

=== 20th century ===
After the November Revolution, Lübeck introduced universal, equal and direct suffrage for men and women. The elected Bürgerschaft adopted a parliamentary constitution for the city-state in 1920. The Social Democratic Party and several middle-class groups dominated the parliament until the Nazi Party became its largest party in 1932.

After the Nazi seizure of power in 1933, Lübeck was subjected to Gleichschaltung. Friedrich Hildebrandt became Reichsstatthalter for Lübeck and Mecklenburg in May 1933 and installed Otto-Heinrich Drechsler as mayor in place of the elected Social Democrat Paul Löwigt.

The Law on the Reconstruction of the Reich abolished the state parliaments in 1934. Under the Greater Hamburg Act, Lübeck ceased to be a state on 1 April 1937 and became part of the Prussian Province of Schleswig-Holstein.

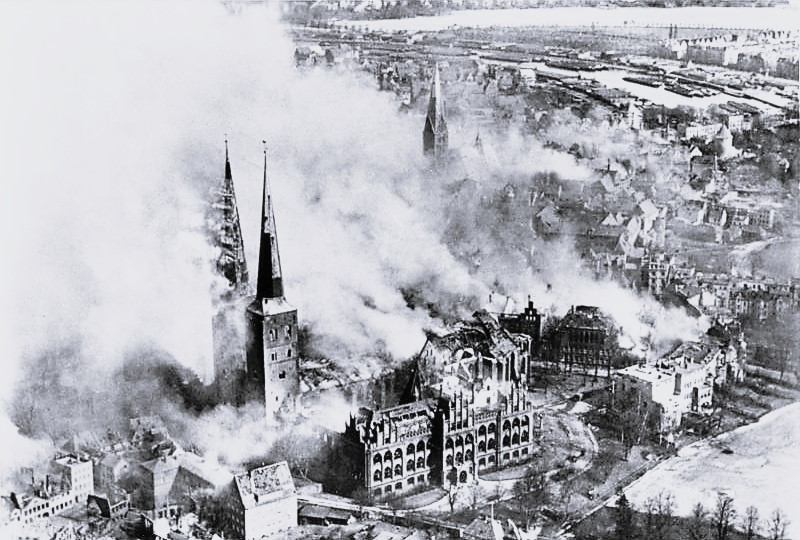
The Lübeck Cathedral burning after the RAF bombing of March 1942

The RAF raid on Lübeck of 28 March 1942 caused a firestorm and severely damaged the historic centre. It killed 320 people, destroyed nearly 1,500 houses and left thousands more damaged. Three of the main churches and large parts of the Gründungsviertel were destroyed or badly damaged.

Oflag X-C, a prisoner-of-war camp for Allied officers, operated in Lübeck from 1940 until 1945. The British Second Army occupied the city without resistance on 2 May 1945.

On 3 May 1945, RAF aircraft attacked ships carrying prisoners from Neuengamme satellite camps in the Bay of Lübeck. The SS Cap Arcona and SS Thielbek caught fire and capsized, killing more than 7,000 people.

About 90,000 displaced people arrived in Lübeck between 1945 and 1948. The new border cut the city off from much of its eastern hinterland and disrupted its economy and transport links. During the Cold War, Lübeck was the only major West German city directly on the inner German border. The crossing at Schlutup was the northernmost road crossing into East Germany.

Reconstruction of the old town began in 1949. In 1987, UNESCO designated the historic centre a World Heritage Site.

In April 2015, Lübeck hosted the G7 conference.

== Climate ==
Lübeck has an oceanic climate (Köppen: Cfb; Trewartha: Dobk). Lübeck is located on the eastern coast of the Baltic Sea and is strongly influenced by the Baltic Sea. Average temperatures range from 2 °C (36 °F) in winter to 18 °C (64 °F) in summer. Although summers are cooler than in inland areas, there is still a high probability of high-temperature days. On average, there are 6.6 days per year with maximum temperatures exceeding 30 °C (86 °F).

The Lübeck weather station has recorded the following extreme values:

- Highest Temperature 38.0 °C (100.4 °F) on 9 August 1982.
- Warmest Minimum 21.5 °C (70.7 °F) on 30 July 2018.
- Coldest Maximum −16.1 °C (3.0 °F) on 18 January 1893.
- Lowest Temperature −27.2 °C (−17.0 °F) on 4 February 1912.
- Highest Daily Precipitation 95.7 mm (3.77 in) on 17 July 2002.
- Wettest Month 188.9 mm (7.44 in) in August 2010.
- Wettest Year 933.9 mm (36.77 in) in 1998.
- Driest Year 381.3 mm (15.01 in) in 1959.
- Highest annual sunshine duration: 2,064.5 hours in 1959.
- Lowest annual sunshine duration: 1,300.7 hours in 1998.

Climate data for Lübeck (1991–2020 normals, extremes 1890–present (Note: Temperature data for Lübeck have been recorded since 1890. The weather station data used from 1 January 1890 to 30 June 1973 came from Lübeck-Werft, and temperature data from 1 July 1973 to 28 February 1985 came from Lübeck weather station, and temperature data from 1 March 1985 to the present are from Lübeck Airport.))
Month	Jan	Feb	Mar	Apr	May	Jun	Jul	Aug	Sep	Oct	Nov	Dec	Year
Record high °C (°F)	15.7 (60.3)	18.6 (65.5)	23.8 (74.8)	29.8 (85.6)	34.2 (93.6)	34.8 (94.6)	37.9 (100.2)	38.0 (100.4)	32.4 (90.3)	26.8 (80.2)	19.9 (67.8)	15.4 (59.7)	38.0 (100.4)
Mean maximum °C (°F)	10.4 (50.7)	11.4 (52.5)	16.6 (61.9)	22.8 (73.0)	27.2 (81.0)	29.8 (85.6)	31.8 (89.2)	31.7 (89.1)	26.2 (79.2)	20.3 (68.5)	14.0 (57.2)	11.0 (51.8)	33.7 (92.7)
Mean daily maximum °C (°F)	3.7 (38.7)	5.0 (41.0)	8.7 (47.7)	13.9 (57.0)	18.2 (64.8)	21.1 (70.0)	23.8 (74.8)	23.5 (74.3)	19.1 (66.4)	13.7 (56.7)	7.7 (45.9)	4.6 (40.3)	13.5 (56.3)
Daily mean °C (°F)	1.4 (34.5)	2.0 (35.6)	4.4 (39.9)	8.5 (47.3)	12.6 (54.7)	15.7 (60.3)	18.0 (64.4)	17.7 (63.9)	13.9 (57.0)	9.4 (48.9)	5.2 (41.4)	2.4 (36.3)	9.2 (48.6)
Mean daily minimum °C (°F)	−1.3 (29.7)	−1.1 (30.0)	0.4 (32.7)	3.0 (37.4)	6.5 (43.7)	9.9 (49.8)	12.3 (54.1)	12.2 (54.0)	9.2 (48.6)	5.7 (42.3)	2.2 (36.0)	−0.1 (31.8)	4.9 (40.8)
Mean minimum °C (°F)	−11.4 (11.5)	−9.7 (14.5)	−6.7 (19.9)	−3.4 (25.9)	−0.2 (31.6)	4.5 (40.1)	7.2 (45.0)	6.9 (44.4)	3.4 (38.1)	−1.9 (28.6)	−5.0 (23.0)	−8.5 (16.7)	−13.9 (7.0)
Record low °C (°F)	−24.3 (−11.7)	−27.2 (−17.0)	−19.1 (−2.4)	−8.4 (16.9)	−3.0 (26.6)	−0.1 (31.8)	3.4 (38.1)	2.6 (36.7)	−2.6 (27.3)	−7.8 (18.0)	−14.3 (6.3)	−18.8 (−1.8)	−27.2 (−17.0)
Average precipitation mm (inches)	59.9 (2.36)	51.0 (2.01)	47.9 (1.89)	38.0 (1.50)	49.6 (1.95)	70.8 (2.79)	71.5 (2.81)	71.1 (2.80)	54.0 (2.13)	55.4 (2.18)	55.3 (2.18)	65.6 (2.58)	680.8 (26.80)
Average extreme snow depth cm (inches)	4.0 (1.6)	6.7 (2.6)	3.9 (1.5)	0.8 (0.3)	0 (0)	0 (0)	0 (0)	0 (0)	0 (0)	0 (0)	1.6 (0.6)	3.2 (1.3)	11.3 (4.4)
Average precipitation days (≥ 1.0 mm)	12.8	10.8	10.7	8.0	9.9	10.6	10.9	11.4	9.9	10.3	11.2	11.9	128.4
Average relative humidity (%)	87.7	84.5	80.0	74.6	73.0	74.1	74.3	76.2	81.2	85.7	89.4	89.4	80.8
Mean monthly sunshine hours	42.2	60.5	119.4	183.1	231.0	216.6	223.1	203.5	149.8	103.7	48.4	32.3	1,606.2
Source 1: World Meteorological Organization
Source 2: DWD Open Data

== Population ==
Historical population
Year	Pop.	±%
1350	18,800	—
1502	25,444	+35.3%
1807	31,450	+23.6%
1845	38,190	+21.4%
1871	48,274	+26.4%
1900	93,241	+93.1%
1910	112,890	+21.1%
1925	124,358	+10.2%
1939	154,811	+24.5%
1946	239,194	+54.5%
1951	234,960	−1.8%
1956	229,554	−2.3%
1961	236,477	+3.0%
1966	242,616	+2.6%
1971	239,761	−1.2%
1976	230,407	−3.9%
1981	219,403	−4.8%
1986	209,159	−4.7%
1991	213,847	+2.2%
1996	215,673	+0.9%
2001	213,496	−1.0%
2006	211,213	−1.1%
2011	213,112	+0.9%
2016	218,253	+2.4%
2021	216,227	−0.9%
Population size may be affected by changes in administrative divisions. Source:

Lübeck has a population of about 217,000 people and is the second-largest city in Schleswig-Holstein. Lübeck became a major city after joining the Hanseatic League in the 15th century. Lübeck later became one of Europe's most important Hanseatic cities. Following World War II, the population of Lübeck grew rapidly due to the refugee crisis, as many people from East Prussia and other former parts of Germany had to flee there after the war. The population began to decline in the 1970s but grew again in the 1990s after the German Reunification, as many people from the former East Germany came to Lübeck because it lies directly on the former East German border. Today Lübeck attracts many tourists due to its rich history and Hanseatic architecture, and it is known as one of the most beautiful cities in Germany.

The largest ethnic minority groups are Turks, Central Europeans (Poles), Southern Europeans (mostly Greeks and Italians), Eastern Europeans (e.g. Russians and Ukrainians), Arabs, and several smaller groups.

Rank	Nationality	Population (31 Dec. 2022)
1.	Turkey	4,500
2.	Ukraine	2,867
3	Poland	2,496
4	Syria	2,363
5	Croatia	1,425
6	Italy	1,237
7	Afghanistan	1,024
8	Greece	971
9	Portugal	956
10	Bulgaria	724

== Politics ==
The current mayor of Lübeck is Jan Lindenau of the Social Democratic Party (SPD). The most recent mayoral election was held in 2017. The Lübeck city council governs the city alongside the mayor.

== Culture ==
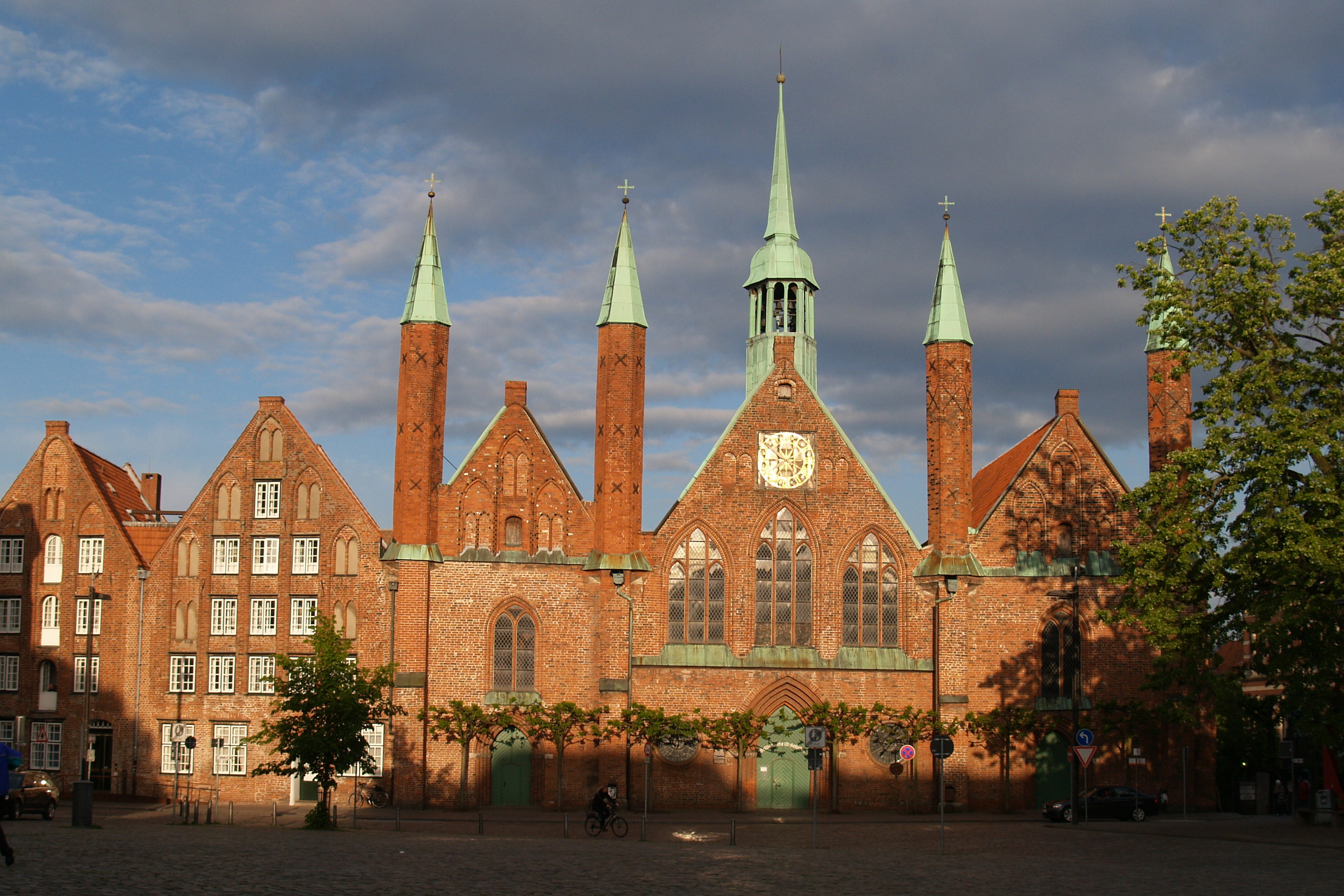
Hospital of the Holy Spirit, one of the oldest social institutions of Lübeck (1260)

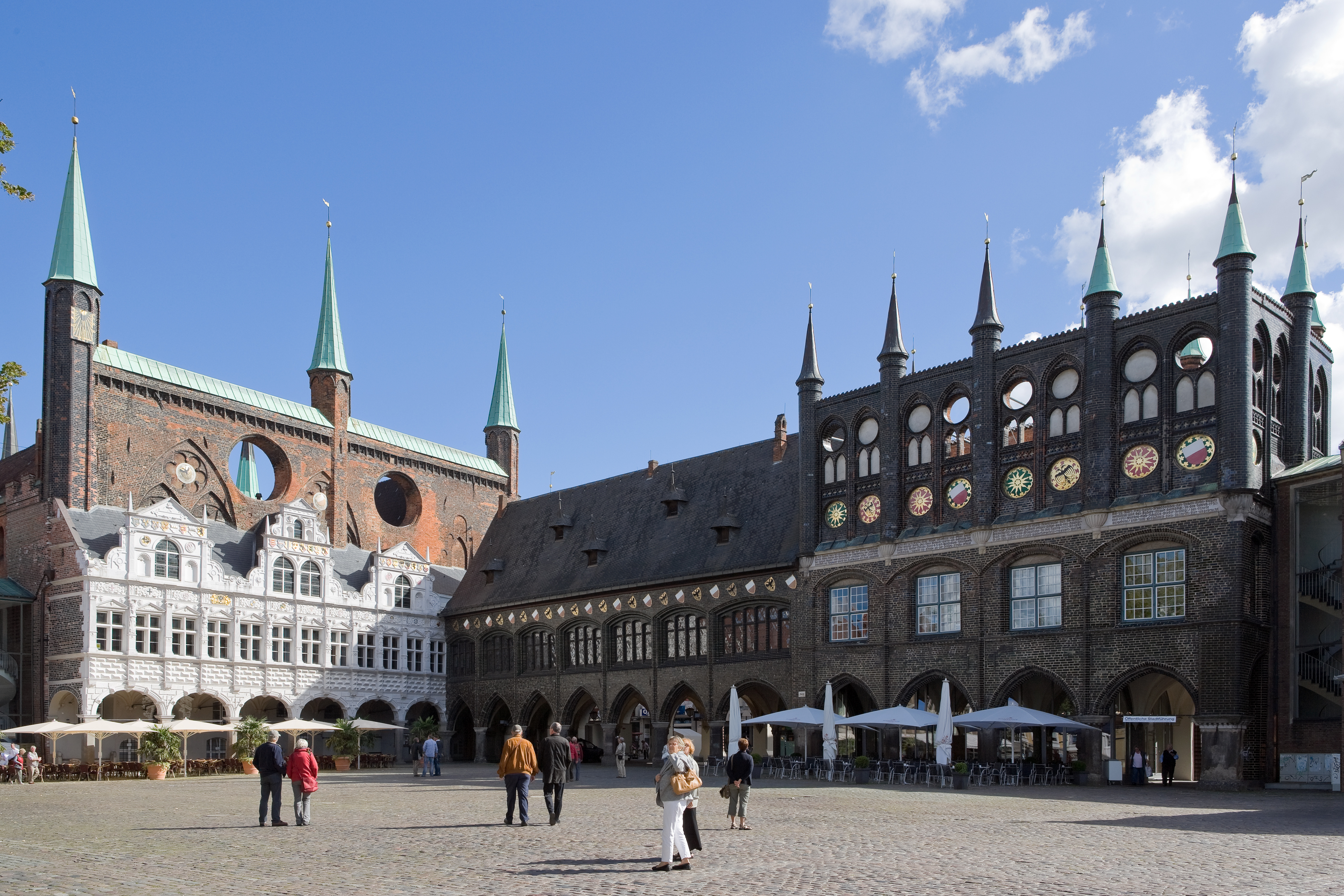
City hall

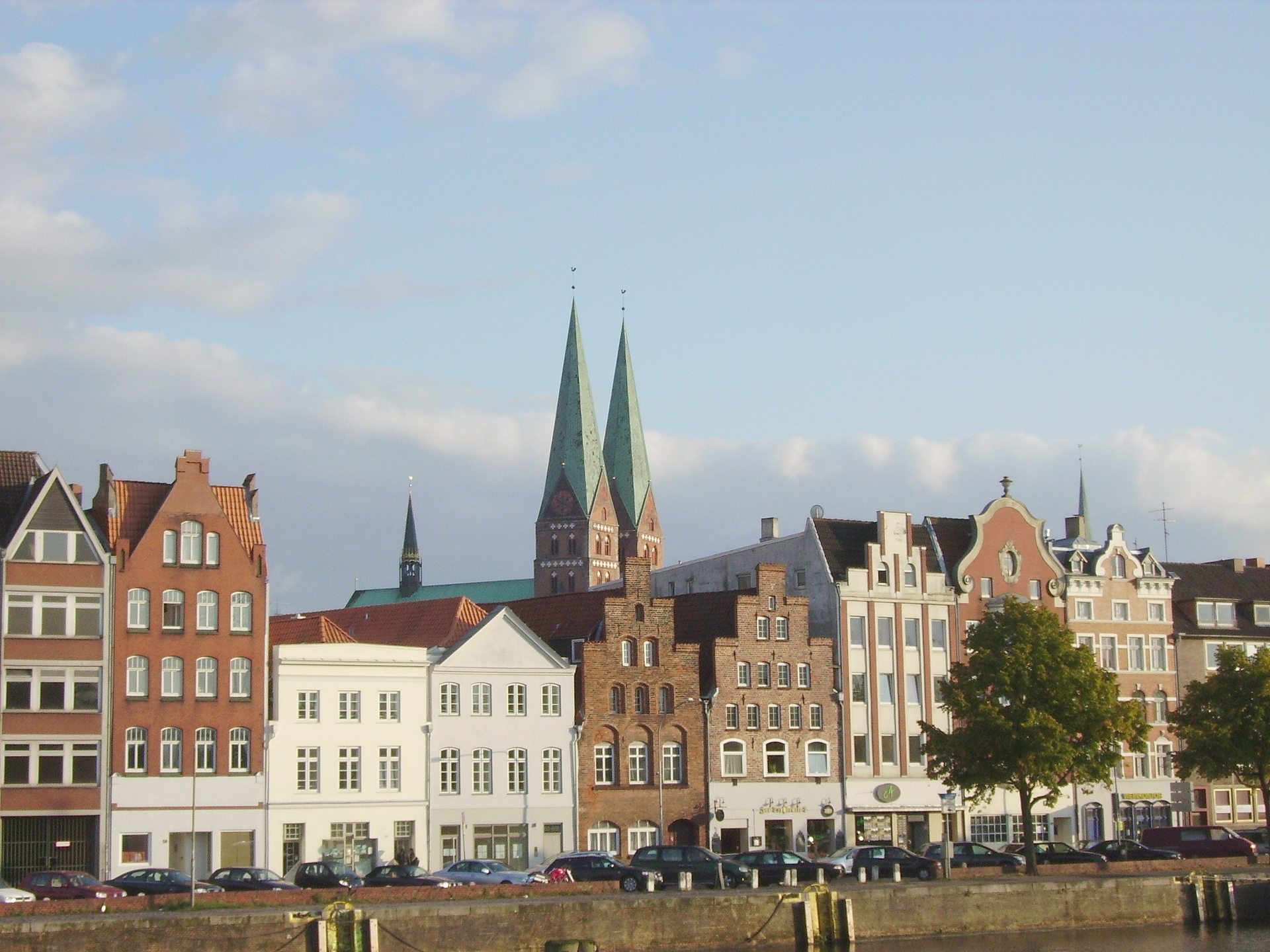
St. Mary's Church

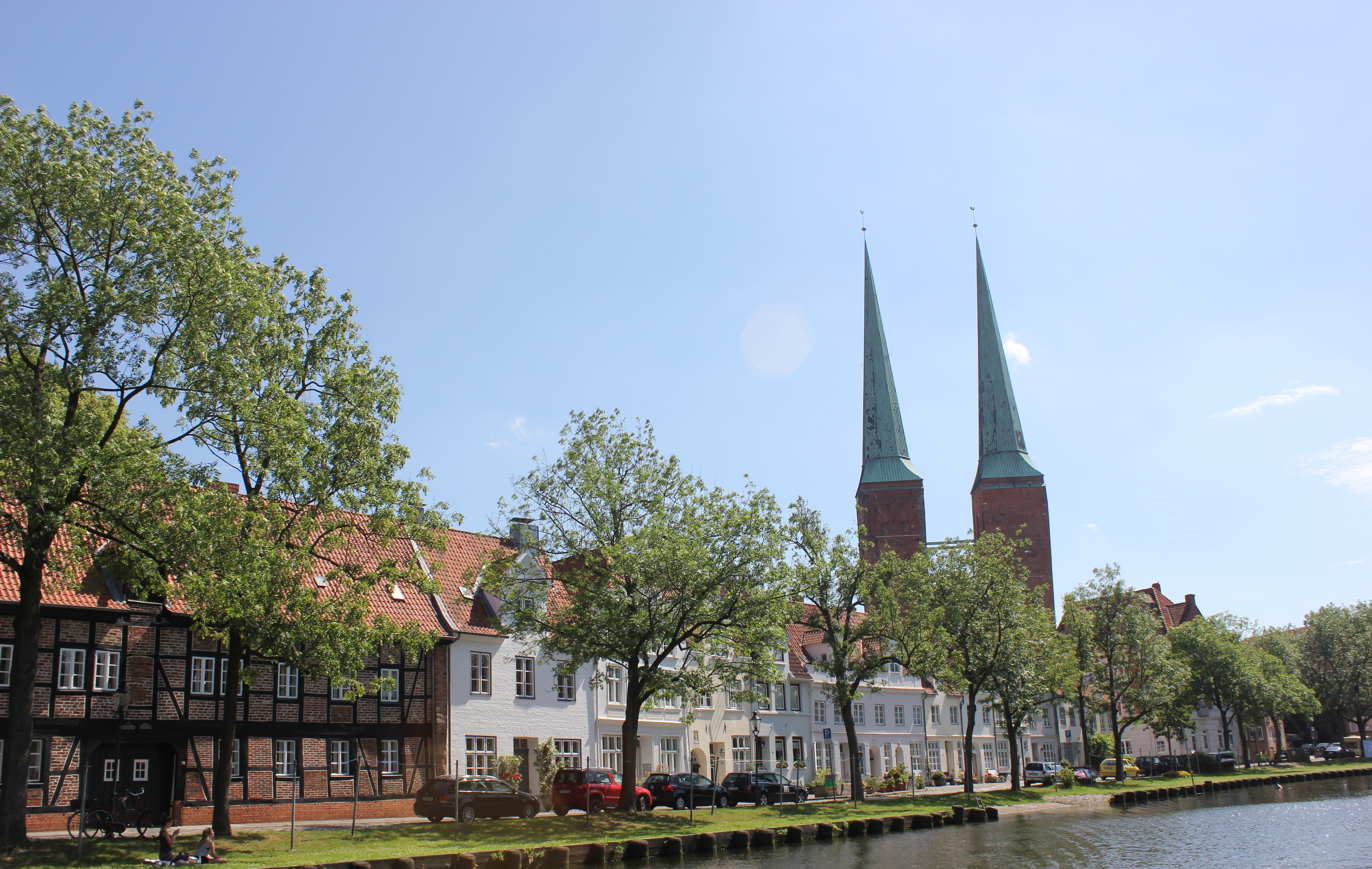
Lübeck Cathedral and historic buildings at the Obertrave

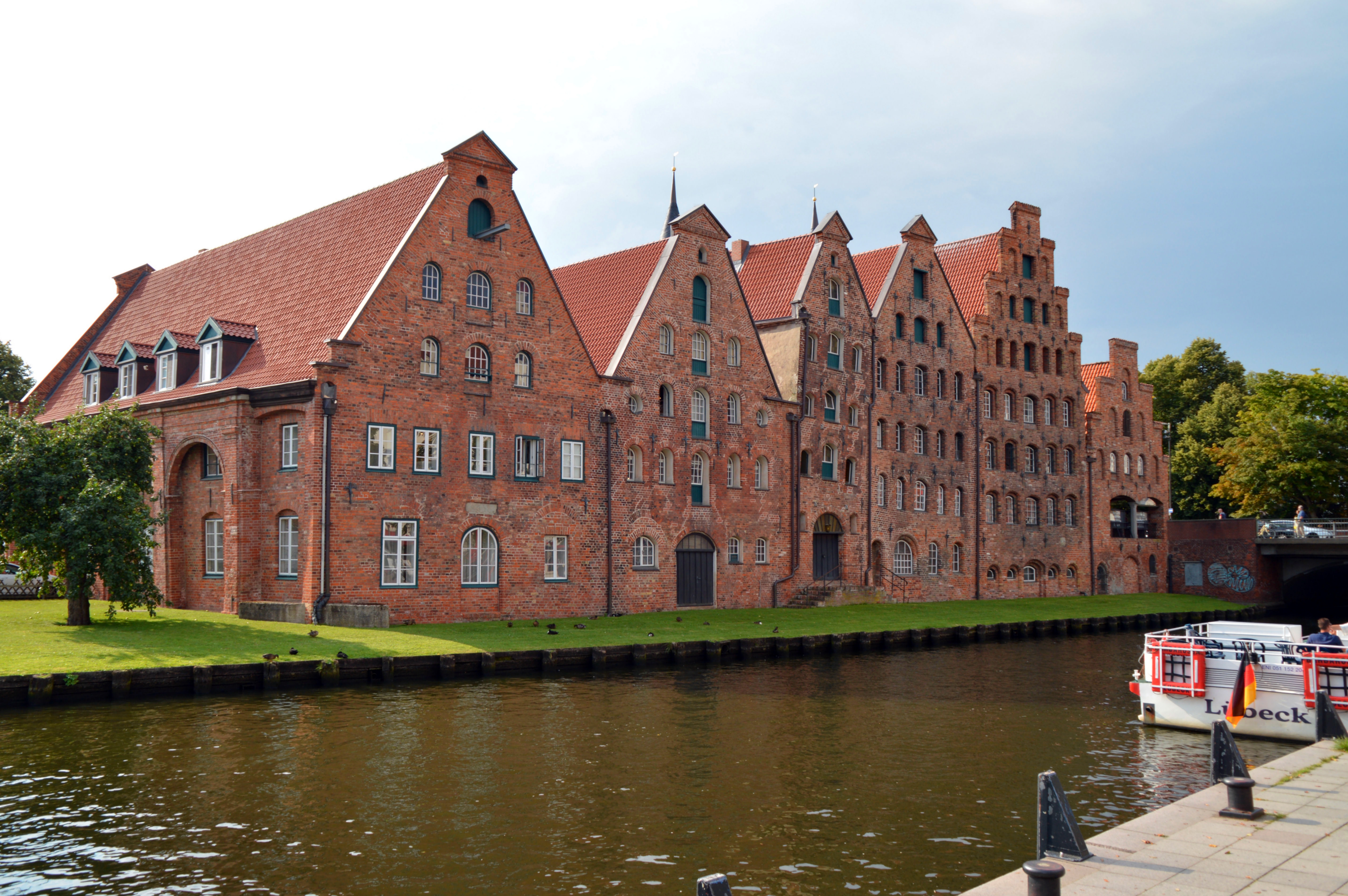
Salzspeicher

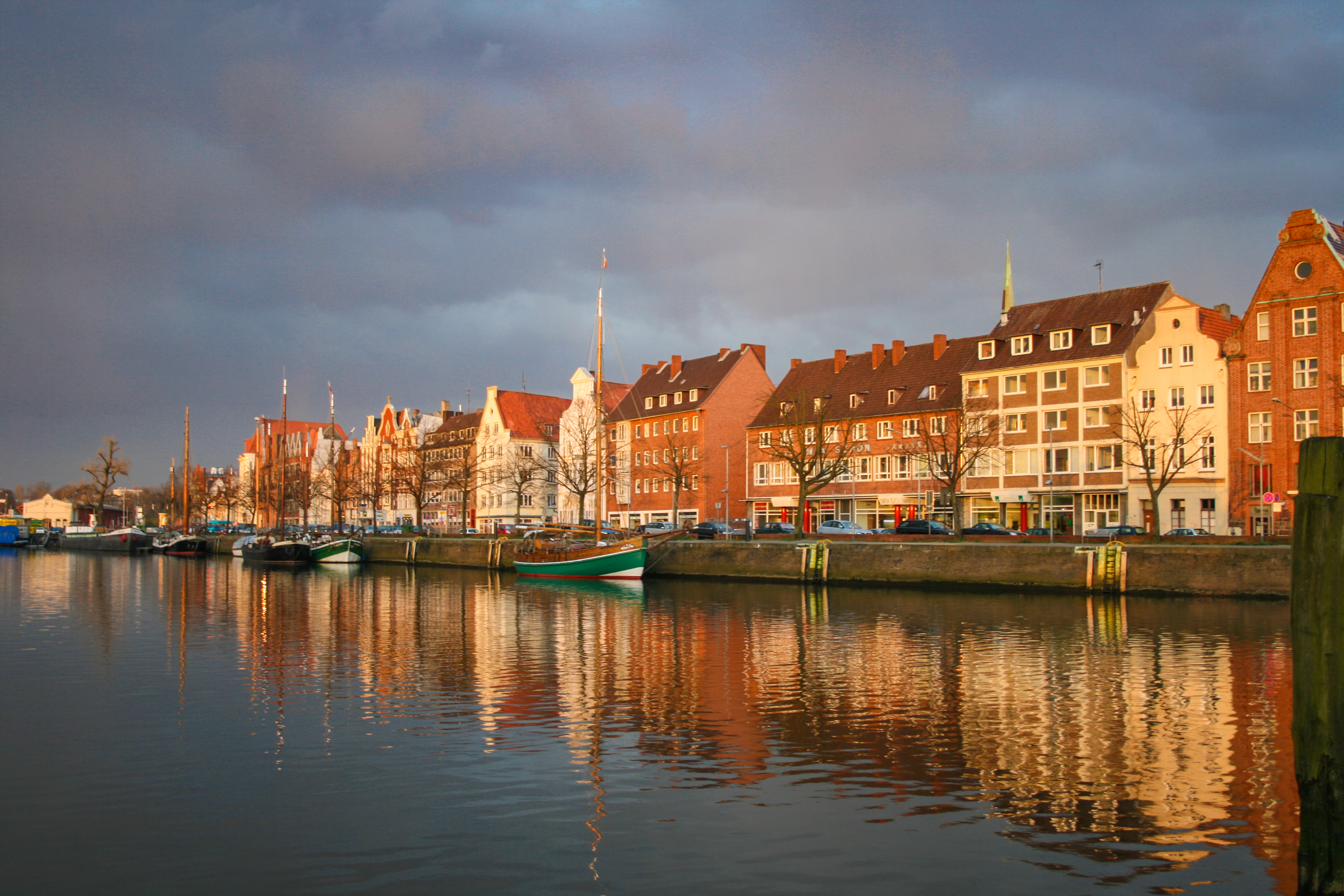
Lübeck, Trave

=== Tourism ===
In 2019, Lübeck recorded 2 million overnight stays. Lübeck is famous for its medieval city centre with its churches, Holstentor, and small alleys. Lübeck has been called "Die Stadt der 7 Türme" (the city of seven towers) because of its seven prominent church towers. Like many other places in Germany, Lübeck has a long tradition of holding a Christmas market in December, which includes the famous handicrafts market inside the Heiligen-Geist-Hospital (Hospital of the Holy Spirit), located at the northern end of Königstrasse.

=== Buildings ===
Much of Lübeck's Old Town preserves its medieval structure: despite severe damage in the Second World War, when almost 20% of the city was destroyed, UNESCO states that the basic structure of the Old City remains largely unaltered and that its layout is clearly recognisable. Of Lübeck's former city gates, the Holstentor, built from 1464 to 1478, and the Burgtor, completed in 1444, survive today.

The old town centre is dominated by seven church steeples. The oldest churches are Lübeck Cathedral and the Marienkirche (Saint Mary's), both dating from the 13th and 14th centuries.

Built in 1286, the Hospital of the Holy Spirit at Koberg is one of the oldest existing social institutions in the world and one of the most important buildings in the city. The Hospital functions as both a retirement home and a nursing home. Some historical parts have been made available for public viewing.

Other sights include:

- The City Hall
- St. Catherine's Church, a church that belonged to a former monastery, now the Katharineum, a Latin school
- Thomas Mann's house
- Günter Grass's house
- Church of St Peter
- Church of St Lawrence, located on the site of a cemetery for people who died during the 16th-century plague
- Church of St James, 1334
- Church of the Sacred Heart
- Church of St Aegidien
- the Salzspeicher, historic warehouses where salt delivered from Lüneburg awaited shipment to Baltic ports
- The city of Travemünde on the coast of the Baltic Sea.

=== Music, literature and the arts ===
The composer Franz Tunder was principal organist in the Marienkirche, Lübeck when he initiated the tradition of weekly Abendmusiken. In 1668, his daughter Anna Margarethe married the Danish-German composer Dieterich Buxtehude, who became the new organist at the Marienkirche. Some of the rising composers of the day travelled to Lübeck to witness his performances, notably Handel and Mattheson in 1703, and Bach in 1705.

Writer and Nobel laureate Thomas Mann was a member of the Mann family of Lübeck merchants. His well-known 1901 novel Buddenbrooks made readers in Germany (and later worldwide, through numerous translations) familiar with the manner of life and mores of the 19th-century Lübeck bourgeoisie.

Lübeck became the scene of a notable art scandal in the 1950s. Lothar Malskat was hired to restore medieval frescoes of the Marienkirche, which were unearthed as a result of severe bomb damage during World War II. Instead, he painted new works, which he passed off as restorations, fooling many experts. Malskat later revealed the deception himself. Writer and Nobel laureate Günter Grass featured this incident in his 1986 novel The Rat; from 1995, he lived close to Lübeck in Behlendorf, where he was buried in 2015.

=== Museums ===
Lübeck has many small museums, such as the St. Anne's Museum Quarter, Lübeck, the Behnhaus, the European Hansemuseum, and the Holstentor. Lübeck Museum of Theatre Puppets is a privately run museum. Waterside attractions include the Fehmarnbelt lightship and the Lisa von Lübeck, a reconstruction of a 15th-century Hanseatic caravel. The marzipan museum on the second floor of Café Niederegger in Breite Strasse explains the history of marzipan and shows historical wood molds for the production of marzipan blocks and a group of historical figures made of marzipan.

=== Food and drink ===
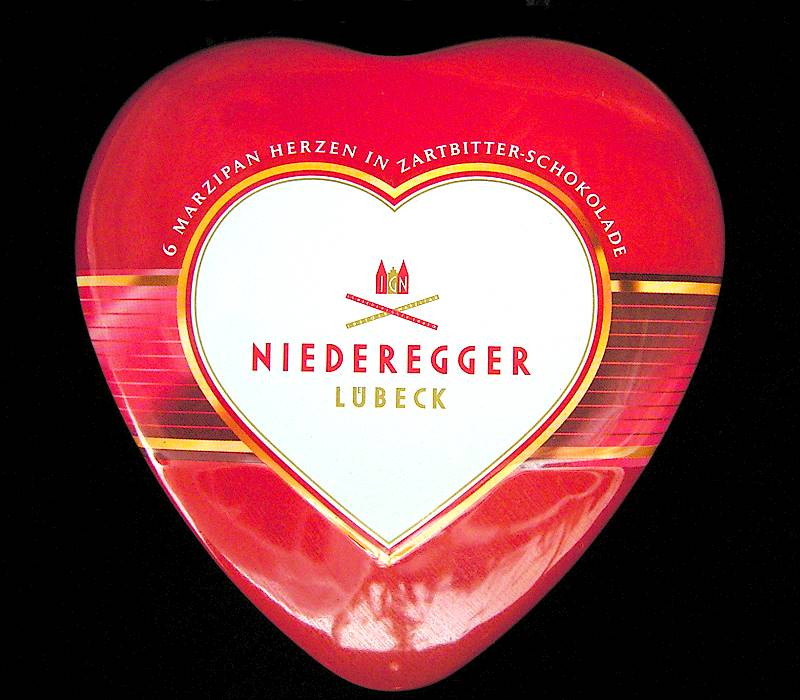
Niederegger marzipan

Lübeck is famous for its marzipan industry. According to local legend, marzipan was first made in Lübeck, possibly in response to either a military siege of the city or a famine year. The story, perhaps apocryphal, is that the city ran out of all food except stored almonds and sugar, which were used to make loaves of marzipan "bread". Others believe that marzipan was actually invented in Persia a few hundred years before it was supposedly invented in Lübeck. The best-known producer is Niederegger, which tourists often visit while in Lübeck, especially at Christmas time.

The Lübeck wine trade dates back to Hanseatic times. One Lübeck specialty is Rotspon, a wine made from grapes processed and fermented in France and transported in wooden barrels to Lübeck, where it is stored, aged and bottled.

As in other coastal North German communities, Fischbrötchen and Brathering are popular takeaway foods, given the abundance of fish varieties.

== Sports ==
Lübeck is home to 3. Liga side VfB Lübeck, who play at the 17,849-capacity Stadion an der Lohmühle. In addition to the football department, the sports club has departments for badminton, women's gymnastics, handball, and table tennis.

== Education ==
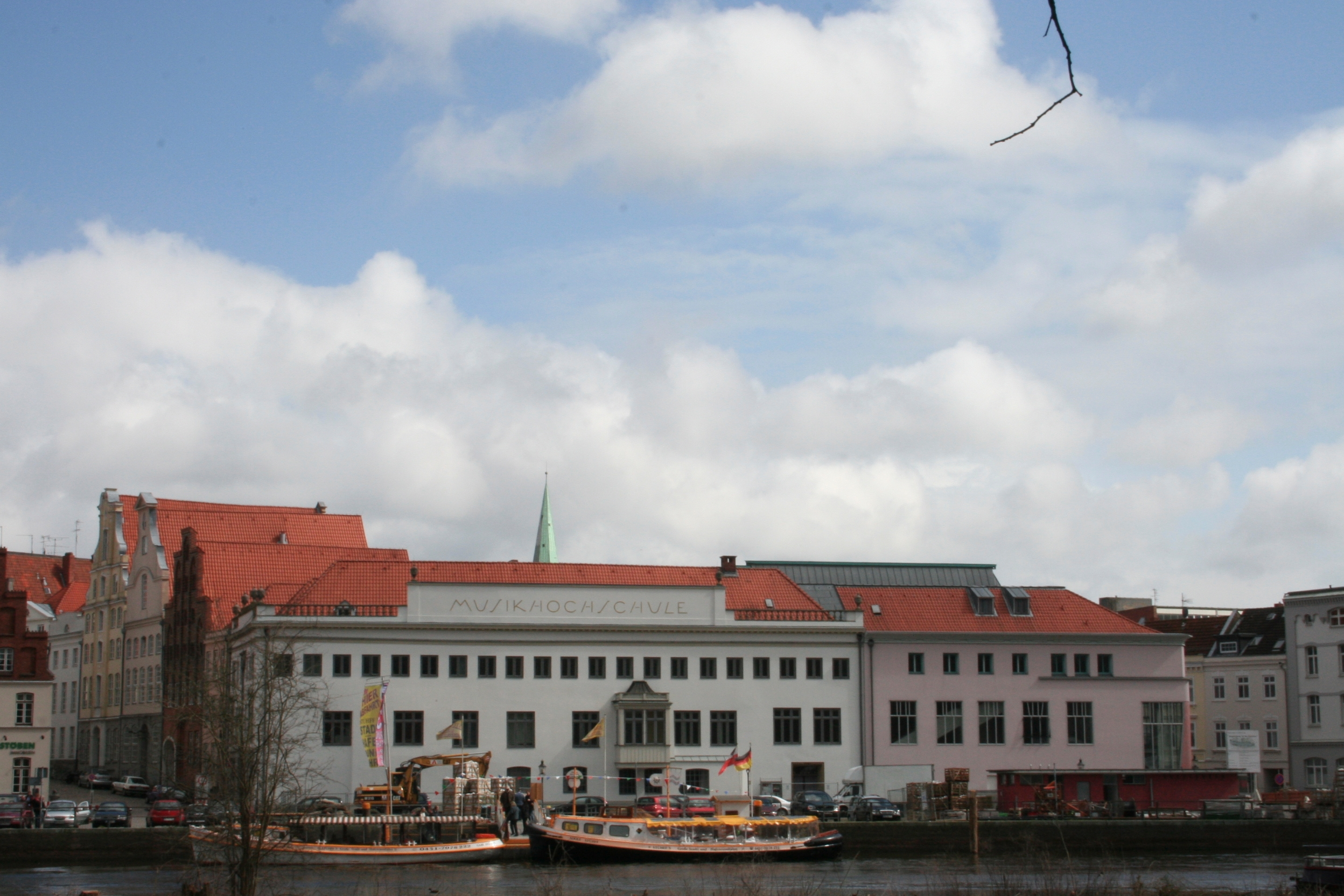
The Lübeck Academy of Music

Lübeck has three universities, the University of Lübeck, the Technical University of Applied Sciences Lübeck, and the Lübeck Academy of Music. The Graduate School for Computing in Medicine and Life Sciences is a central faculty of the university and was established as part of the German Excellence Initiative. The International School of New Media is an affiliated institute of the university. The Academy of Hearing Acoustics is Germany's central education facility for hearing-aid professionals, responsible for industry-wide vocational training.

== Districts ==
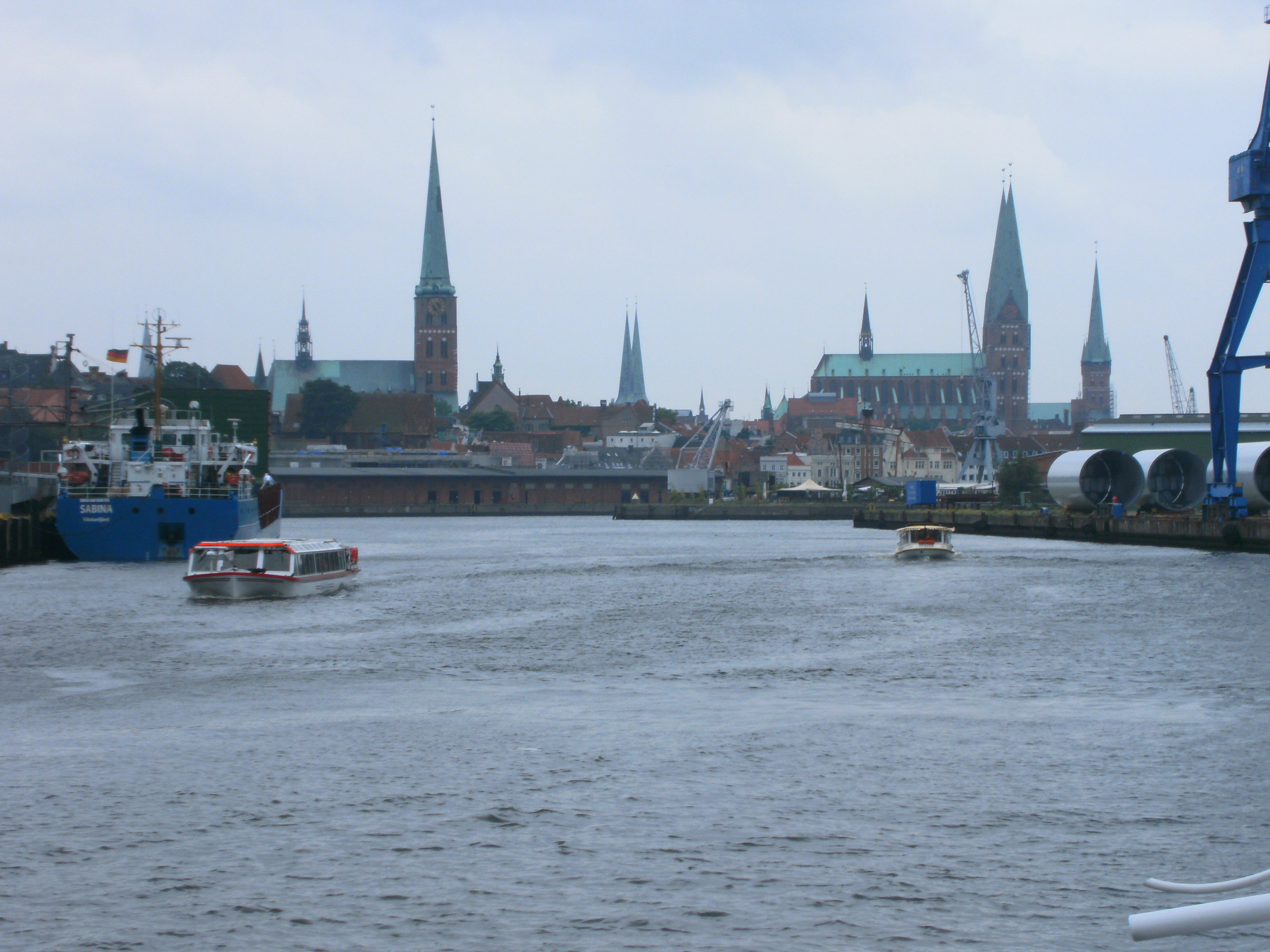
The skyline of the old town as seen from the north

Lübeck main station (Lübeck Hauptbahnhof)

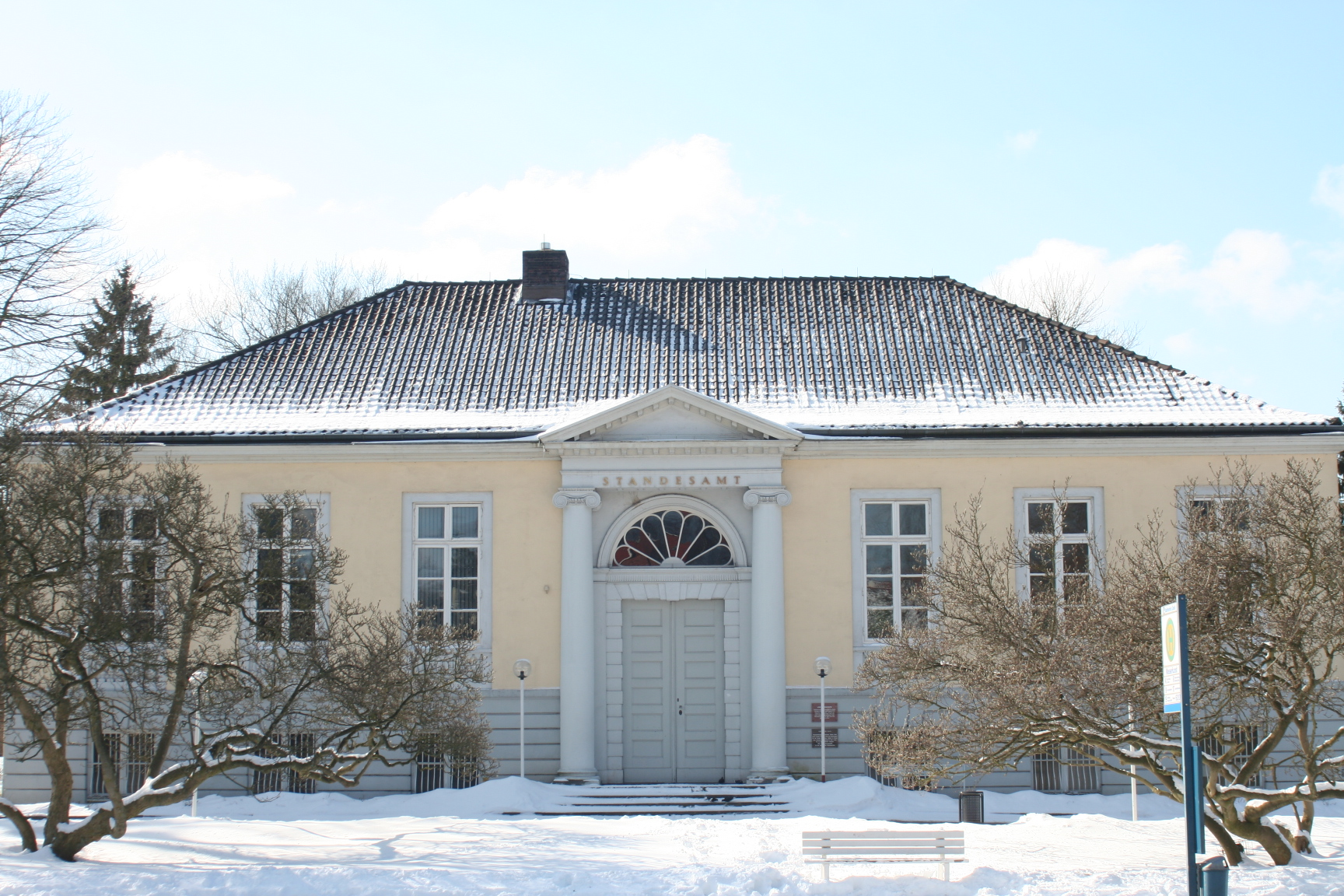
Lübeck civil registration office, in the St. Jürgen zone

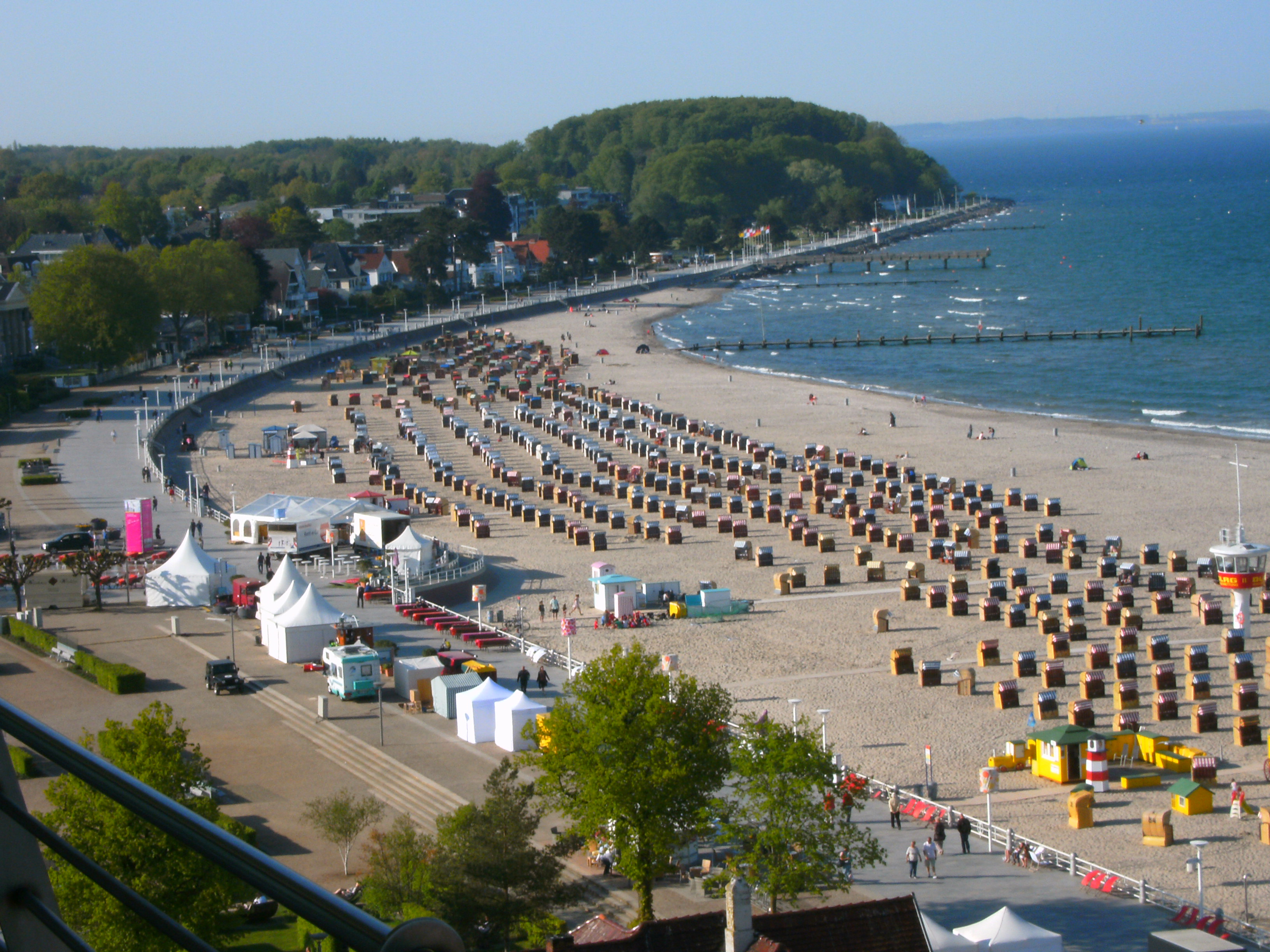
The beach of Travemünde

The city of Lübeck is divided into 10 zones. These are divided into 35 urban districts. The 10 zones, with their official numbers, associated urban districts and populations, are:

- 01 City centre (~ 12,000 inhabitants)

The Innenstadt is the main tourist attraction and consists of the old town as well as the former ramparts. It is the oldest and smallest part of Lübeck.

- 02 St. Jürgen (~ 40,000 inhabitants)
  - Hüxtertor / Mühlentor / Gärtnergasse, Strecknitz / Rothebek, Blankensee, Wulfsdorf, Beidendorf, Krummesse, Kronsforde, Niederbüssau, Vorrade, Schiereichenkoppel, Oberbüssau

Sankt Jürgen is one of three historic suburbs of Lübeck (alongside St. Lorenz and St. Gertrud). It is located south of the city centre and is the largest district.

- 03 Moisling (~ 10,000 inhabitants)
  - Niendorf / Moorgarten, Reecke, Old-Moisling / Genin

Moisling is situated in the far south-west. Its history dates back to the 17th century.

- 04 Buntekuh (~ 10,000 inhabitants)

Buntekuh lies in the west of Lübeck. A large part of the district is occupied by commercial areas such as the Citti-Park, Lübeck's biggest mall.

- 05 St. Lorenz-South (~ 12,000 inhabitants)

Sankt Lorenz-Süd is located immediately southwest of the city centre and has the highest population density. The main train and bus station lies in its northern part.

- 06 St. Lorenz-North (~ 40,000 inhabitants)
  - Holstentor-North, Falkenfeld / Vorwerk / Teerhof, Großsteinrade / Schönböcken, Dornbreite / Krempelsdorf

Sankt Lorenz-Nord is situated in the north-west of Lübeck. It is separated from its southern counterpart by the railways.

- 07 St. Gertrud (~ 40,000 inhabitants)
  - Burgtor / Stadtpark, Marli / Brandenbaum, Eichholz, Karlshof / Israelsdorf / Gothmund

Sankt Gertrud is located east of the city centre. This part is mainly known for its natural surroundings. Many parks, the rivers Wakenitz and Trave and the forest Lauerholz cover much of its area.

- 08 Schlutup (~ 6,000 inhabitants)

Schlutup lies in the far east of Lübeck. Due to the forest Lauerholz to its west and the river Trave to its north, Schlutup is relatively isolated from the other districts.

- 09 Kücknitz (~ 20,000 inhabitants)
  - Dänischburg / Siems / Rangenberg / Wallberg, Herrenwyk, Alt-Kücknitz / Dummersdorf / Roter Hahn, Poeppendorf

North of the river Trave lies Kücknitz. It is the former principal industrial area of Lübeck.

- 10 Travemünde (~ 15,000 inhabitants)
  - Ivendorf, Alt-Travemünde / Rönnau, Priwall, Teutendorf, Brodten

Travemünde is located in far northeastern Lübeck on the Baltic Sea. With its long beach and coastline, Travemünde is the second-most-popular tourist destination in Lübeck.

== International relations ==
=== Twin towns – sister cities ===
Lübeck is twinned with:

- Kotka, Finland (1969)
- Wismar, Germany (1987)
- La Rochelle, France (1988)
- Klaipėda, Lithuania (1990)
- Visby, Sweden (1999)

=== Friendly cities ===
Lübeck also has friendly relations with:

- Venice, Italy (1979)
- Kawasaki, Japan (1992)
- Bergen, Norway (1996)
- Shaoxing, China (2003)

== Transport ==
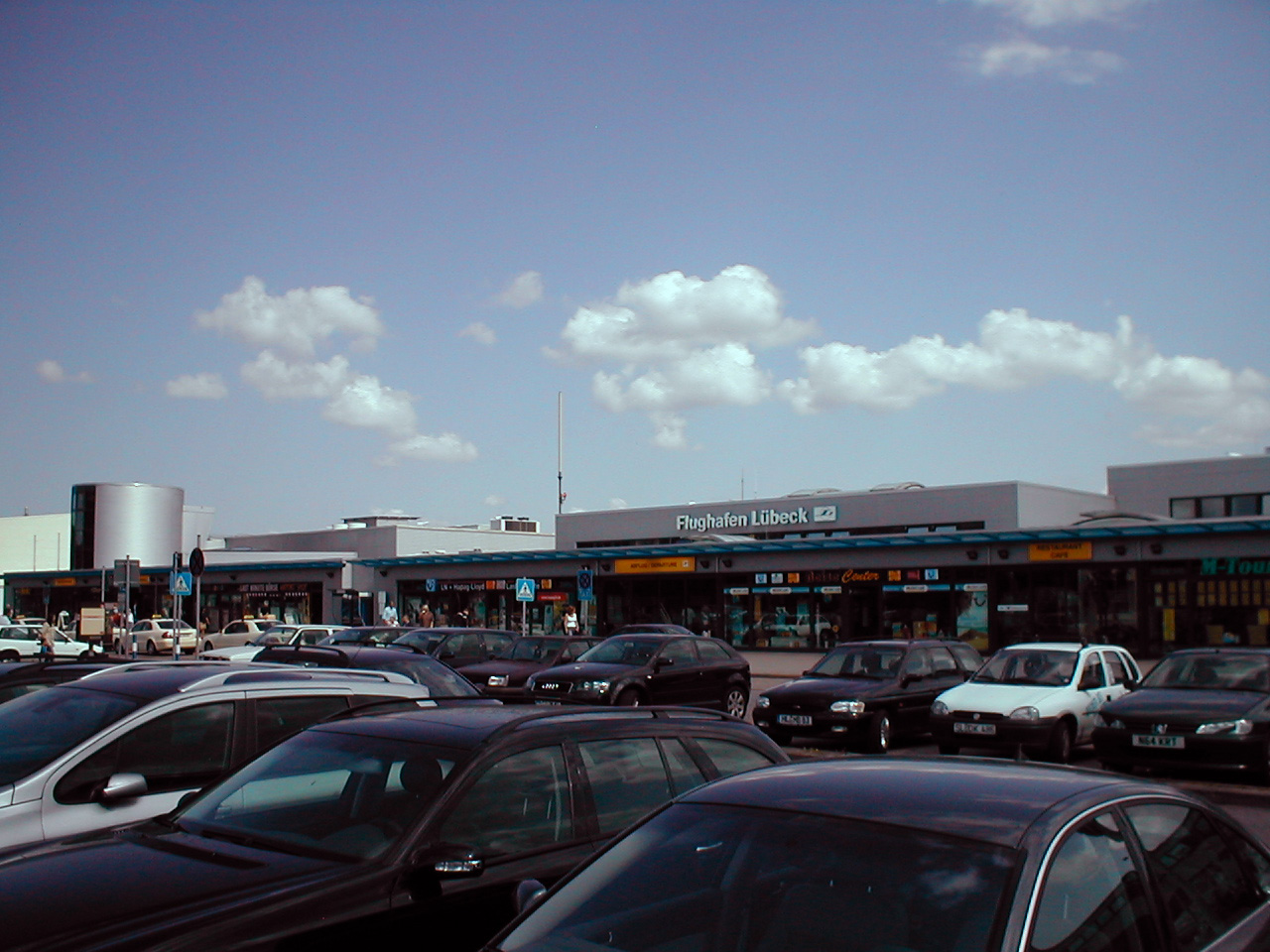
Lübeck Airport

Lübeck is connected to three main motorways (Autobahnen). The A1 Motorway heads north to the island of Fehmarn and Copenhagen (Denmark) and south to Hamburg, Bremen and Cologne. The A20 Motorway heads east towards Wismar, Rostock and Szczecin (Poland) and west to Bad Segeberg and to the North Sea. The A226 Motorway starts in central Lübeck and heads northeast to the seaport city of Travemünde.

Lübeck is served by multiple railway stations. The principal one is Lübeck Hauptbahnhof, which, with about 31,000 passengers per day, is the busiest station in Schleswig-Holstein. The station is mostly served by regional rail services to Hamburg, Lüneburg, Kiel, the island of Fehmarn and Szczecin (Poland). There are some long-distance trains to Munich, Frankfurt am Main and Cologne. During the summer holidays, there are many extra rail services. Until the end of 2019, Lübeck was a stop on the Vogelfluglinie train line from Hamburg to Copenhagen (Denmark).

Public transport by bus is organised by the Lübeck City Transport Company (Lübecker Stadtverkehr). There are 40 bus lines serving the city and the area around Lübeck, in addition to regional bus services.

The district of Travemünde is on the Baltic Sea and has the city's main port. The Skandinavienkai (the quay of Scandinavia) is the departure point for ferry routes to Malmö and Trelleborg (Sweden); Liepāja (Latvia); Helsinki (Finland); and Saint Petersburg (Russia). The Port of Lübeck is Germany's second-largest Baltic port.

Lübeck Airport is located in the south of Lübeck in the town of Blankensee. It has limited international flights. The nearest major airport is Hamburg Airport, located 74 km (46 mi) to the south-west of Lübeck.

== Notable people ==
=== Religion ===
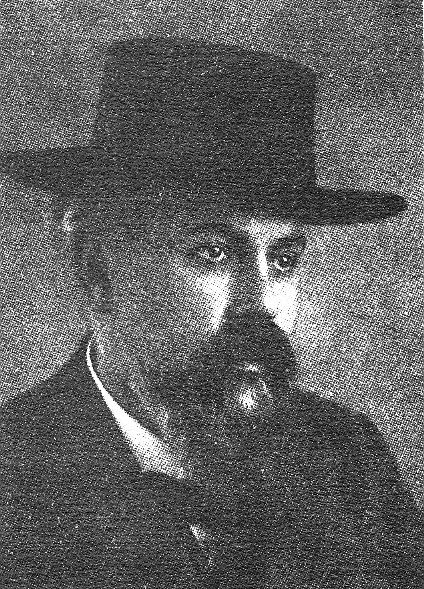
Ephraim Carlebach, 1936

- Laurentius Surius (1522–1578), Carthusian monk and hagiographer
- August Hermann Francke (1663–1727), pedagogue and theologian who founded the Francke Foundations
- Johann Lorenz von Mosheim (1693–1755), Lutheran church historian
- Lübeck Martyrs: Three Roman Catholic priests and one Evangelical Lutheran clergyman were executed by beheading within three minutes of one another at Hamburg's Holstenglacis Prison on 10 November 1943
- Ephraim Carlebach (1879–1936), rabbi and founder of the Higher Israelite School in Leipzig
- Joseph Carlebach (1883–1942), rabbi, victim of the Holocaust
- Felix Carlebach (1911–2008), rabbi

=== Politics ===
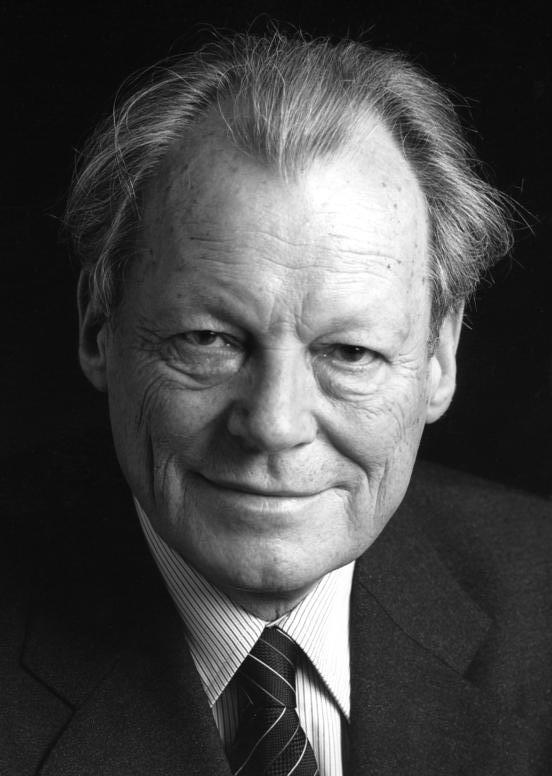
Willy Brandt, 1980

- Werner Huno (died 1291 in Lübeck), merchant and councilor of the Hanseatic city of Lübeck
- Johann Wittenborg (1321–1363), Mayor of Lübeck who lost the Battle of Helsingborg
- Jürgen Wullenwever (c. 1492–1537), burgomaster of Lübeck from 1533 to 1535
- George Wulweber, 16th-century Protestant who was tortured on the rack
- Friedrich Krüger (1819–1896), diplomat for the Hanseatic cities of Lübeck, Hamburg and Bremen
- John Rugee (1827–1894), politician in Wisconsin, USA
- Gustav Radbruch (1878–1949), legal scholar and politician
- Hermann Lüdemann (1880–1959), CDU politician
- Otto-Heinrich Drechsler (1895–1945), Mayor of Lübeck from 1933 to 1937 who set up the Riga Ghetto
- Haim Cohn (1911–2002), Israeli jurist and politician
- Willy Brandt (1913–1992), SPD politician, German chancellor
- Helga Kleiner (born 1935), CDU politician
- Björn Engholm (born 1939), SPD politician
- Robert Habeck (born 1969), writer and politician for Alliance 90/The Greens
- Birgitt Ory (born 1964), diplomat
- Beatrix von Storch (born 1971), AfD politician, former MEP

=== Art ===
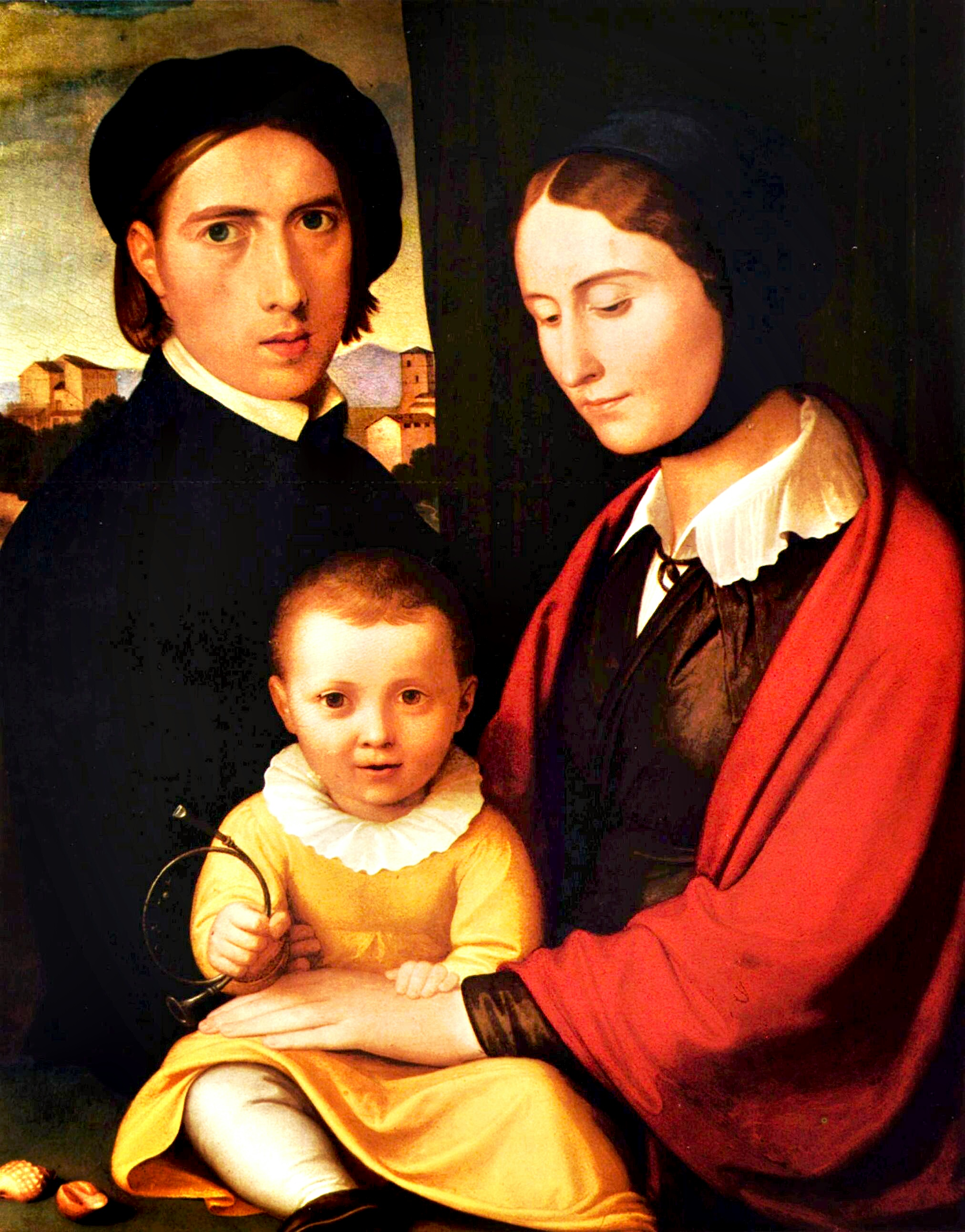
J. F. Overbeck, self-portrait with family, 1820

- Benjamin Block (1631–1690), German-Hungarian Baroque painter
- Sir Godfrey Kneller (1646–1723), court painter of several British monarchs
- Catharina Elisabeth Heinecken (1683–1757), artist and alchemist
- Carl Heinrich von Heineken (1707–1791), art historian
- Friedrich Overbeck (1789–1869), painter and head of the Nazarenes
- Johann Wilhelm Cordes (1824–1869), landscape painter
- Gotthardt Kuehl (1850–1915), painter
- Maria Slavona (1865–1931), impressionist painter, sister of Cornelia Schorer
- Erich Ponto (1884–1957), actor
- Walter D. Asmus (born 1941), theatre director
- Justus von Dohnányi (born 1960), actor
- Jonas Nay (born 1990), actor

=== Music ===
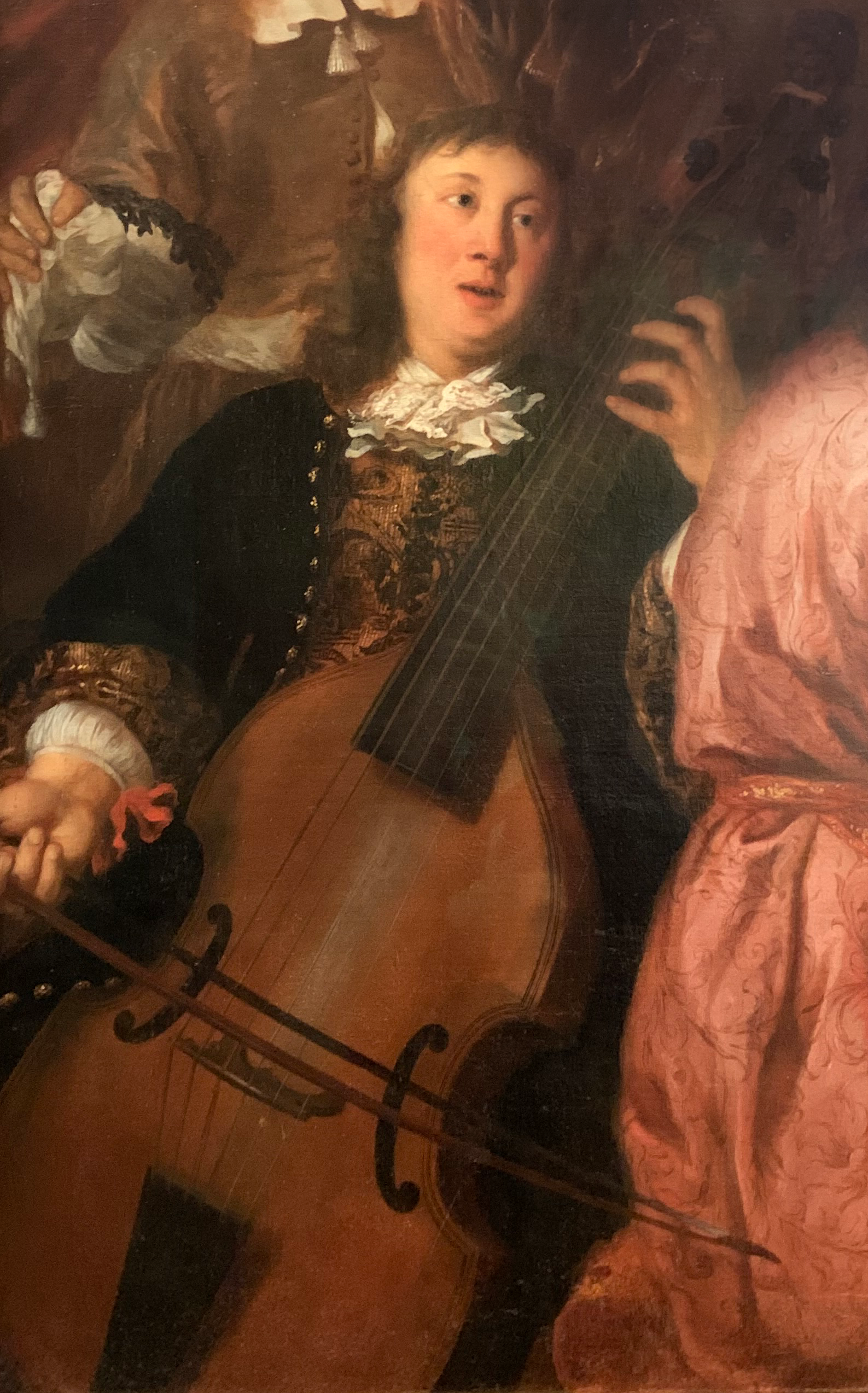
Dieterich Buxtehude

- Franz Tunder (1614–1667), organist and composer
- Thomas Baltzar (c. 1631–1663), violinist and composer.
- Rüdiger Bohn (born 1960), conductor and professor
- Dieterich Buxtehude (c. 1637–1707), composer and organist
- Andreas Kneller (1649–1724), composer and organist
- Friedrich Ludwig Æmilius Kunzen (1761–1817), composer
- Anja Thauer (1945–1973), cellist

=== Science ===
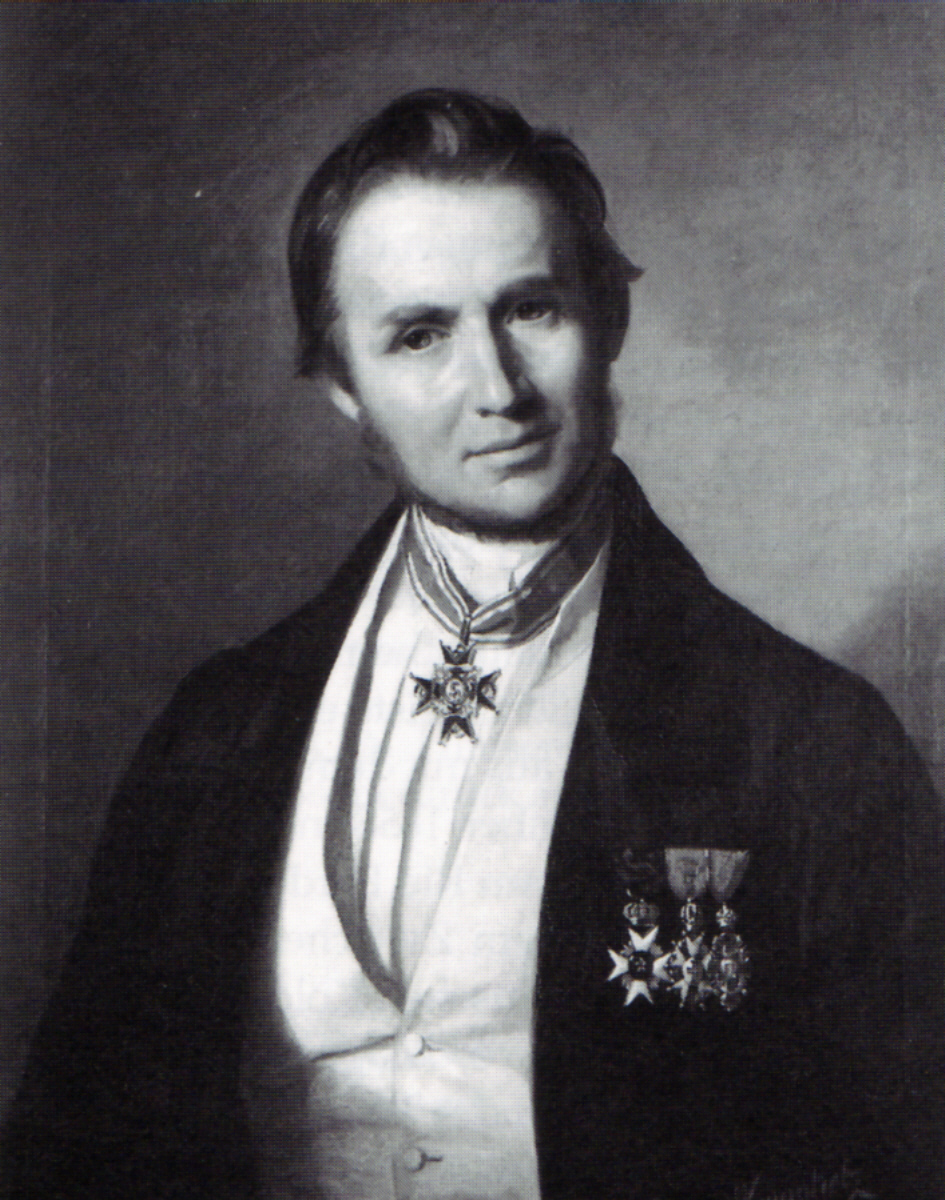
Robert Christian Ave-Lallemant, 1851

- Joachim Jungius (1587–1657), mathematician, physicist, and philosopher
- Heinrich Meibom (1638–1700), medical expert who discovered the Meibomian gland
- Hermann von Fehling (1811–1885), chemist
- Robert Christian Avé-Lallemant (1812–1884), physician and research traveler
- Ernst Curtius (1814–1896), classical archaeologist and historian
- Georg Curtius (1820–1885), philologist
- Friedrich Matthias Claudius (1822–1869), anatomist
- James Behrens (1824–1898), entomologist.
- Friedrich Matz (1843–1874), archaeologist
- Friedrich Wilhelm Gustav Bruhn (1853–1927), inventor of the taximeter
- Cornelia Schorer (1863–1939), one of Germany's first female physicians
- Heinrich Lüders (1869–1943), orientalist and indologist
- Justus Mühlenpfordt (1911–2000), nuclear physicist
- Wolfgang Luthe (1922–1985), physician, psychotherapist and autogenic training pioneer

=== Writing ===
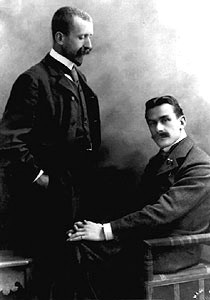
Heinrich (left) and Thomas Mann, 1902

- Arnold of Lübeck (died 1211–1214), author of contemporary chronicles
- Erasmus Finx (1627–1694), polyhistorian, author and church writer
- Christian Adolph Overbeck (1755–1821), mayor and poet
- Johann Bernhard Vermehren (1777–1803), romanticist and lecturer
- Emanuel Geibel (1815–1884), poet
- Gustav Falke (1853–1916), author
- Heinrich Mann (1871–1950), novelist
- Thomas Mann (1875–1955), novelist, winner of the Nobel Prize in Literature in 1929
- Friedrich Ranke (1882–1950), medievalist, philologist, folklorist and writer
- Peter Schneider (1940–2026), novelist, short-story writer and essayist
- Jörg Wontorra (born 1948), sports journalist
- Nicolai Riedel (born 1952), philologist, author and editor

=== Sport ===
- Sandra Völker (born 1974), swimmer who won three medals at the 1996 Summer Olympics
- Marie-Louise Dräger (born 1981), five-time world champion lightweight sculler
- Tobias Kamke (born 1986), professional tennis player
- Maximilian Munski (born 1988), rower and silver medallist at the 2016 Summer Olympics

=== Other ===
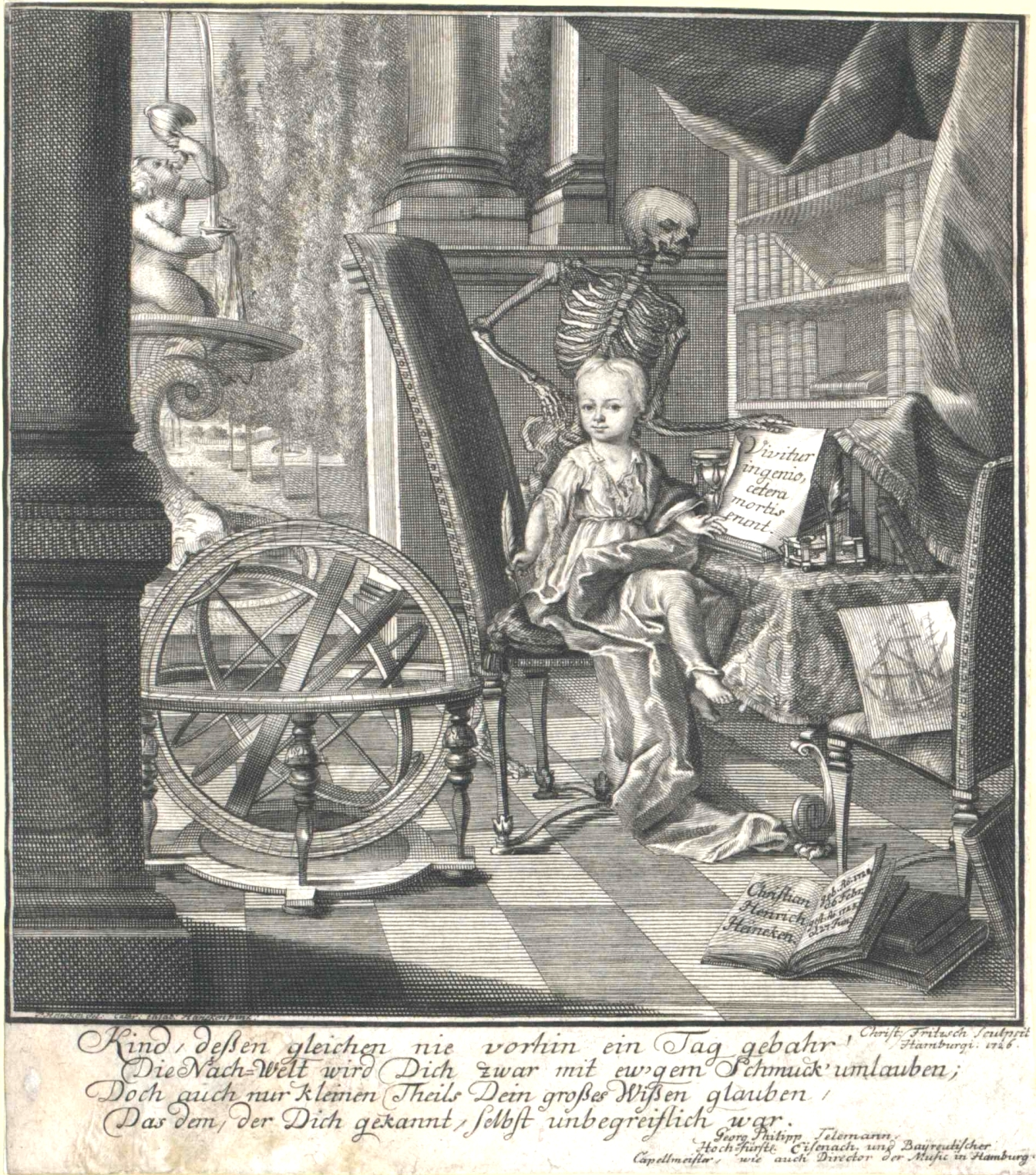
C. F. Heineken, 1726

- Adam Brand (c. 1692–1746), merchant and researcher
- Christian Friedrich Heinecken (1721–1725), "the infant scholar of Lübeck", a child prodigy
- Kurd von Schlözer (1822–1894), diplomat and historian
- Hermann von der Hude (1830–1908), architect
- Hermann Blohm (1848–1930), shipbuilder and company founder
- Hermann Pister (1885–1948), Nazi SS commandant of Buchenwald Concentration Camp
- Hermann Görtz (1890–1947), spy for Nazi Germany in Britain and Ireland
- Walter Ewers (1892–1918), flying ace of WWI
- Hans Blumenberg (1920–1996), philosopher
- Jörg Ziercke (born 1947), chief commissioner of the Federal Criminal Police Office from 2004 to 2014

== See also ==
- Lübeck state elections in the Weimar Republic
- Bombing of Lübeck in World War II
- Cap Arcona
- Lübeck Airport
- Lübeck Hauptbahnhof
- Lübeck law
- Lübeck Nordic Film Days
- Lübecker Nachrichten—Lübeck's only newspaper
- Oberschule zum Dom
- Ports of the Baltic Sea
- Schleswig-Holstein Musik Festival
- VfB Lübeck, football and sports club
