= Salzspeicher =

Historic buildings in Lübeck, Germany

Coordinates: 53.8658°N 10.6802°E

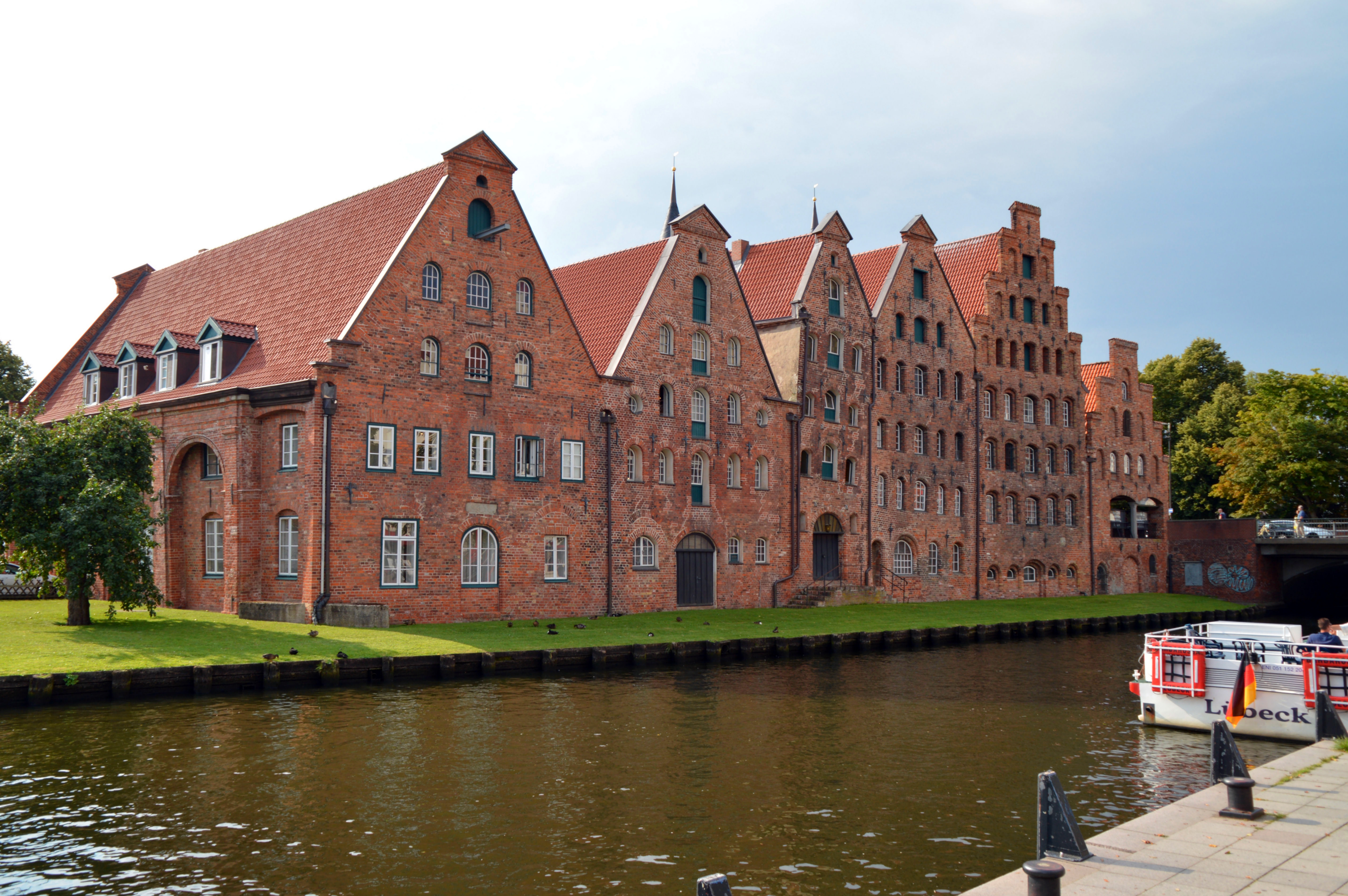
Salzspeicher

The Salzspeicher (salt storehouses), of Lübeck, Germany, are six historic brick buildings on the Upper Trave River next to the Holstentor (the western city gate).

Built in the 16th–18th centuries, the houses stored salt that was mined near Lüneburg and brought to Lübeck over the Stecknitz Canal. The salt was then shipped to several ports in the Baltic region, where the commodity was relatively rare, but was in high demand for the preservation of food. The salt trade from the late Middle Ages onward was a major reason for the power of Lübeck and the Hanseatic League.

In the course of the centuries, the houses were adapted for the storage of different goods, such as cloth, grain and wood.

Part of the complex was used as the residence of Count Orlok in the classic horror movie Nosferatu, eine Symphonie des Grauens as well as the remake Nosferatu the Vampyre.
