= James Behrens =

American entomologist

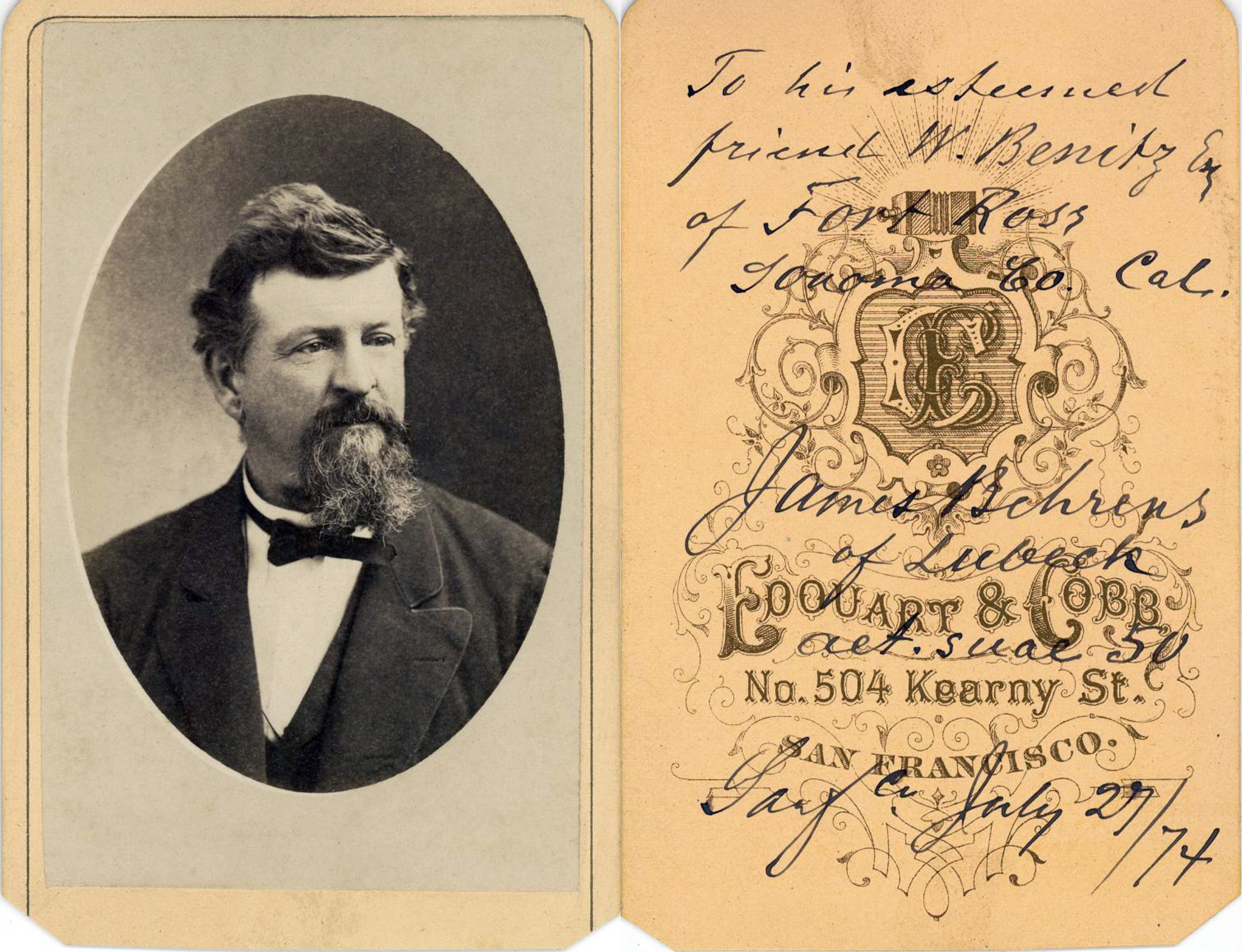
Jakob (James) Behrens, 1874

James Behrens (born in the Hanseatic City of Lübeck, 30 June 1824; died in San Jose, California, 6 March 1898), was an entomologist. He was graduated at the gymnasium Katharineum in Lubeck in 1841, and in 1853 came to the United States. He settled in California, where he became a recognized authority on entomology, in particular Lepidoptera. Behrens contributed papers to scientific journals, and was a member of many scientific societies in the United States and Europe.
