= George Wulweber =

English Protestant under Henry VIII's reign

George Wulweber was an English Protestant during the reign of Henry VIII.

He was imprisoned abroad and racked. He was described by Christopher of Brunswick and Lunenburg, the Archbishop of Bremen in 1536 as: a seditious person who had violently usurped the government of the town of Lübeck, imprisoned the old rulers, robbed the church, and promoted the Lutheran heresy; not satisfied with which, he had raised war in Denmark and Holstein to the Emperor's prejudice.

He was accused of being an Anabaptist, apparently falsely.
