= Hankins =

Hankins is a surname. Notable people with the surname include:

- Abraham P. Hankins (1900–1963), American painter
- Antthony Mark Hankins (born 1968), American fashion designer
- Catherine Hankins (born 1949), Canadian epidemiologist
- Cecil Hankins (1922–2002), American basketball and football player
- Cornelius Hankins (1863–1946), American painter
- Dena Hankins (born 1975), American author
- Dennis B. Hankins (born 1959), American diplomat and ambassador
- Don Hankins (1902–1963), American baseball player
- Ethan Hankins (born 2000), American baseball player
- Frank H. Hankins (1877–1970), American sociologist and anthropologist
- Freeman Hankins (1917–1988), American politician
- George Hankins (born 1997), English cricketer
- Harold Hankins (1930–2009), British electrical engineer
- Harry Hankins (born 1999), English cricketer
- James Hankins (born 1955), American historian
- Jay Hankins (1935–2020), American baseball player
- Jaylan Hankins (born 2000), Gibraltarian footballer
- Jennifer Merelaid Hankins (born 1985), Swedish politician
- Johnathan Hankins (born 1992), American football player
- Lethia Sherman Hankins (1934–2014), American activist and civic leader
- Rebecca Hankins, American academic
- Shirley Hankins (1931–2025), American politician
- Steve Hankins (born 1952), English rugby league footballer of the 1980s
- Terry Hankins (1974–2009), American serial killer
- Thomas L. Hankins (born 1933), American science historian
- Zach Hankins (born 1996), American basketball player

== See also ==
- Hankin, a surname
