= Heineken (surname) =

Heineken is a patronymic surname meaning "son of little Hein" (Henry). Notable people with the surname include:

- Agnes Heineken (1872–1954), German politician
- Carl Heinrich von Heineken (1707–1791), German art historian
- Christian Heinrich Heineken (1721–1725), German child prodigy
- Gerard Adriaan Heineken (1841–1893), founder of the brewing company Heineken
- Freddy Heineken (1923–2002), former president of the brewing company Heineken
- Charlene de Carvalho-Heineken (1954) Dutch businesswoman, heiress of the family that founded the brewing company Heineken
- Karl Heineken (died 1830), German physician and ornithologist
- Marie Heineken (1844–1930), Dutch painter

== See also ==
- Heinecken, a surname
- Anakin (surname)
- Johann David Heinichen (1683–1729), German Baroque composer
