= Annakin =

Annakin or Anakin is a given name and surname of Germanic origin. The name means "son of Anno" or "Son of the Eagle". Anno is a variant of the Old High German given name "Arno" which means Eagle. Notable people with the surname include:

- Chris Annakin (born 1991), British rugby league footballer
- Doug Anakin (1930–2020), Canadian bobsleigher
- Ethel Annakin, the birth name of Ethel Snowden (1881–1951), British socialist, human rights activist, and feminist politician
- Ken Annakin (1914–2009), British film director

== See also ==
- Anakin (disambiguation)
- Heinecken
- Heineken (surname)
- Hankin
