= Telangana State Police Academy =

Police academies in India

Raja Bahadur Venkat Rama Reddy Telangana State Police Academy
- Other name: TGPA
- Former name: Andhra Pradesh Police Academy
- Motto in English: Requisite Knowledge, Necessary Skills, Right Attitude
- Type: Government agency
- Established: 19 May 1986
- Affiliations: UNODC
- Director: Abhilasha Bisht, IPS
- Location: Manchirevula, Hyderabad, Telangana, India
- Campus: 175 acres (0.71 km^{2})
- Colors: Maroon
- Website: tspa.org.in

Raja Bahadur Venkat Rama Reddy Telangana State Police Academy (TGPA) is a government institution in the state of Telangana, India that prepares candidates for service in the police and other law enforcement agencies, and in the fields of forensics, and criminal justice.

It is located in Manchirevula neighbourhood of Hyderabad, India. TSPA works in collaboration with UNODC. It is recognised as "Benchmark" Training Institute.

After the division of Andhra Pradesh state into Telangana and Andhra Pradesh, the academy was listed in Schedule 10 of Andhra Pradesh Reorganisation Act, 2014 and was subsequently renamed as Telangana State Police Academy.

== Geography ==
Surrounded by hillocks in Himayat sagar, TSPA spreads over 175 acres. It is located about 25 km. from Hyderabad City along the Hyderabad – Chevella road. TSPA is just 20 km from Rajiv Gandhi International Airport and just 14 km from Gachibowli IT zone.

== History ==
Sri N.T. Rama Rao, the then Chief Minister of Andhra Pradesh, laid the foundation stone for the academy in 1986. Police Officer Sri C. Anjaneya Reddy, IPS was the spirit behind the academy. Sri A.V. Subba Rao, IPS, Sri. H.J. Dora, IPS, Sri M.V. Krishna Rao, IPS, Sri Jaspal Singh, IPS, Sri A.K.Mohanty, IPS, Sri.M. Ratan, IPS, Dr.C.N. Gopin Natha Reddy IPS and Sri N. Sambasiva Rao, IPS contributed to the academy. Dr. M. Malakondaiah, IPS, Addl. DGP became the director on 25 May 2013.

The academy imparted professional training to trainees across India including Andhra Pradesh, Karnataka, Tamil Nadu, Kerala, Tripura, Bihar, Jharkhand and Union Territory of Lakshadweep. The academy trained 4,396 police personnel and prosecuting officers.

== Courses ==
=== Induction Courses ===
- Basic Courses
- Pre-Promotion Courses
- Orientation Courses

=== In-service Courses ===
- First Course in Investigation.
- Station House Management.
- Essential Law for Police Officers.
- First Course in Forensic Science & Forensic Medicine.

== Faculty departments ==
- Police Science and Misc.
- Intelligence and Security
- Law
- Forensic Science
- Forensic Medicine & Toxicology
- Computers
- Management and Social Sciences
- Administration (Courses for Ministerial Staff)
- Field Training

== Recognition ==
The academy won recognition from:

- Gary Lewis, Representative of UNODC, ROSA
- Wan Joo Kim, Asst. Attorney General for Civil Rights Division, Dept. of Justice, USA.
- Thomas March Bell, Counsel to the Assistant Attorney General for Human Trafficking.
- Evan Andrew Young, Dept. of Justice, United States.
- Duke Lokka, International Narcotics and Law Enforcement Office, US. Embassy, New Delhi.
- Dr. P.M. Nair, Project Coordinator, Anti Human Trafficking, UNODC.

== Museum ==
Dr Hankins TS Police Museum and Discovery center operates at the facility. It is named after Dr. Hankins, the first Inspector General of police for Nizam State during Nizam V and VI in 1880.

=== Galleries ===
- Edged Arms Gallery
- Fire Arms Gallery
- Police Gallery
- Forensic Gallery
- Communication Gallery

The museum has a Zulfiqar Sword that belonged to Mughal emperor Aurangzeb.

== Other facilities ==
- Library
- Research Center
- International Officers Mess
- Auditorium
- Bank
- Hospital
- Swimming Pool
- Athletic Track
- Stadium
- Post office
- Transport and
- Welfare Store

== See also ==
- Sardar Vallabhbhai Patel National Police Academy
