= Egyptian Society for Science Fiction =

The Egyptian Society for Science Fiction
- Formation: 2012
- Headquarters: Nasr City
- President: Hosam Abd Al-Hamid Elzembely

The Egyptian Society for Science Fiction (Arabic: الجمعية المصرية لأدب الخيال العلمي) is a science fiction community which is located in Nasr City, Egypt. The science fiction community was founded by Dr. Hosam Abd Al-Hamid Elzembely in 2012, following the January 2011 revolution in Egypt.

== Founder ==
Hosam Elzembely is a medical doctor (ophthalmologist) and university professor (human development). He has written three novels to date: The Half-Humans, America 2030, The Planet of the Viruses. (The Half-Humans is an adventure story set in outer space, 2030 is an espionage thriller about an impending nuclear war between the future world powers, and the Planet of the Viruses is about a pandemic threatening the human race with total blindness. All written in Arabic but are being revised for publication in English). He has also written several short stories in the sci-fi genre. His love of science fiction began during his early years at school in the United Kingdom, when the Star Wars series came out. He was also introduced at an early age to two distinguished Egyptian authors, the great Islamic thinker Dr. Mustafa Mahmoud, and Nihad Sharif, known as the Dean of Arabic SF. He also has written and published two non-fictional books:

- The 25 January Revolution: Lessons and Examples for Human Development
- Simplifying Medical Sciences for Children

His first novel, The Half-Humans, was a key source for a lecture by Jörg Matthias Determann, a faculty member in the Liberal Arts & Sciences program at the Virginia Commonwealth University School of the Arts in Qatar, held at Seoul National University on Tuesday, May 15, 2018 (South Korea). The lecture was entitled "Space Aliens, Islam and Politics in Arabic Science Fiction". The lecture was part of the Seminar in West Asian Studies. (Details can be found at SNU's Department of Asian Languages and Civilizations website). Dr. Elzembely is mentioned by name on these two posts by Dr. Determann, a distinguished historian who specializes in the Middle East and in the history of science with three books to his name, and more forthcoming. Most recently, in an effort to popularise Egyptian and Arabic science fiction, especially the post-Arab Spring variety, Dr. Elzembely has been interviewed by Strange Horizons magazine, published on 28 January 2019. The interview was conducted by Gautam Bhatia - please follow this link.

== Publications ==
To date the Egyptian Society for Science Fiction has published seven short story anthologies in the Shams Al-Ghad (Sun of Tomorrow) series, with a sixth planned anthology that will be dedicated to children's SF. The anthologies are all in Arabic but they each contain a short story translated into English. The anthologies also contain reviews and essays on particular works of science fiction and discussions of the state of the genre in Egypt and the Arab world. The first anthology outlined the mission statement and the set of ambitions of the Egyptian Society for Science Fiction, which was to promote science fiction in Egypt through publications, venues and events and earn SF some critical notoriety in Arab literature, as well as coordinate with like-minded groups and individuals across the world.

Most recently the ESSF has published its first non-fiction book Arab and Muslim Science Fiction: Critical Essays, (21 March 2022), edited by Dr. Hosam Elzembely and co-edited by Emad El-Din Aysha. The book consists of academic articles, personal essays and detailed interviews from sci-fi enthusiasts (authors, editors, bloggers, translators, academics) from around the world. The list includes Turkey, Iran, Nigeria, Pakistan, Bosnia, Algeria, Malaysia, Syria, Uzbekistan, Tunis, Morocco, Afghanistan, Egypt, Palestine, Jordan, Iraq, the UAE, Sudan, Kuwait, Yemen, Senegal, Indonesia, Oman, as well as non-Muslim countries like the Philippines, India, Russia, the United States, Australia, etc. The contributors to Arab and Muslim Science Fiction, including Dr. Hosam Elzembely and Emad El-Din Aysha, are: Marcia Lynx Qualey, James E. Gunn, Kawthar Ayed, Faycel Lahmeur, Abdulhakeem Amer Tweel, Ahmed Salah Al-Mahdi, Mouad Bouyadou, Ziane Guedim, Taleb Omran, with Jeremy Szal, Fadi Zaghmout, Mohammed Abdullah Alyasin, Zahra Jannessari-Ladani, Ibrahim Al-Marashi, Noura al Noman, Abdulwahab Al-Rifaee, Farkhondeh Fazel Bakhsheshi, Dr. Naif Al-Mutawa, Wajdi Muhammad Al-Ahdal, Manar Al Hosni, Harun Šiljak, Gamze G. Özfırat, İsmail Yamanol, Shamil Idiatullin, Hamid Ismailov, Abdulwakil Sulamal, Müfit Özdeş, Funda Özlem Şeran, Saqib Sadiq, Sami Ahmad Khan, Muhammad Aurangzeb Ahmad, Moussa Ould Ebnou, Mame Bougouma Diene, Rafeeat Aliyu, Ashiru Muheez Afolabi, Amir Tag Elsir, Azrul Bin Jaini, Riawani Elyta, Kristine Ong Muslim, Aditya Nugraha Wardhana, Rebecca Hankins, Barbara K. Dick, Areeg Ibrahīm.

The book is part of the Critical Explorations in Science Fiction and Fantasy series published by McFarland, edited by Donald E. Palumbo and C. W. Sullivan III. (For a comprehensive list please consult the internet speculative fiction database, including our book, which is number 74 in the series).

Date	Name	Authors
2012	Al-Qadimun (The Arrivals)	Dr. Hosam Elzembely, Mustafa Seif Al-Din, Amal Ziyada, Mohammad Abd Al-Aleem, Mohammad Ahmed Al-Nagi, Lamyaa Al-Said Abd Al-Salam; non-fiction contributions were also made by Dr. Hosam Elzembely, Amal Ziyada, Magid Al-Qadi, Yasir Abu Al-Hasab, Mohammad Farouk.
2013	Al-Aidun (Those Who Returned)	Dr. Hosam Elzembely, Muhammad Naguib Matter, Lamyaa Al-Said, Ahmed Badran, Dr. Zaynab Abu Al-Nagah, Magid Al-Qadi, Magid Shahin, Saida Abd Allah; non-fiction contributions by Dr. Hosam Elzembely.
2013	Al-Thairun (The Rebels)	Dr. Hosam Elzembely, Lamyaa Al-Said, Amr Al-Munufi, Muhammad Naguib Matter, Eman Baha A-Din, Haitham Mumtaz, Mohammad Fatylynah, Hibatullah Muhammad Hassan, Muhammad Esmat Abd Al-Hamid, Mahmoud Hassanien, Amr Al-Munufi, Zainab Muhammad; non-fiction contributions by Dr. Hosam Elzembely and Dr. Nader Abd Al-Khaliq.
2013	Al-Muntasirun (The Victors)	Dr. Hosam Elzembely, Lamyaa Al-Said, Muhammad Naguib Matter, Sharif Shawqi, Muhammad Abd Al-Razaq, Muhammad Abd Al-Alim, Muhammad Ahmed Al-Nagi, Amr Al-Munufi, Muhammad Esmat Abd Al-Hamid, Ahmed Badran, Samar Ziyada, Manal Abd Al-Hamid, Marwa Al-Mazun, Ahmed Al-Nahas, Noura Kamal, Mahmoud Hassaniewn, Gubran Salih Ali Harmal, Muhammad Ali Ali; non-fiction contribution by Dr. Hosam Elzembely.
2017	Al-Samidun (Those Who Persevered)	Dr. Hosam Elzembely, Manal Abd Al-Hamid, Hebatullah Muhammad Hassan, Ahmed Salah Al-Mahdi, Wael Abd Al-Rahim, Muhammad Naguib Matter, Lina Kilani, Moataz Hassanien, Abd Allah Mattar, Duaa Ahmed Shukri, Nadia Al-Kilani, Ahmed Migahid, Abeer Al-Mufti, Essam Saad Hamad, Yusra Ahmed Hassan, Dr. Emad El-Din Aysha, Mahmoud Abd al-Rahim, Essam Qabil, Ahmed Badran, Ahmed Al-Sayyid; non-fiction contributions were made by Dr. Hosam Elzembely and Khaled Gouda.
2019	Al-Mustaqbaliun (The Futurists)	A special edition dedicated to children's SF, showcased at the Cairo International Book Fair. Manal Abd Al-Hamid, Yousra Ahmed Khamis, Rania Masoud, Maram Sidqi, Dr. Hosam Elzembely, Salih Sharaf A-Din, Ahmed Hamdi Al-Ashab, Muhammad Naguib Matter, Wael Abd Al-Raheem, Hossam Al-Khatieb, Muhammad Muhyi Al-Din, Emad El-Din Aysha, Ahmed Abd Al-Raheem, Safaa Al-Aghmawi, Ahmed Suwailam, Talaat Abu Salamah, Ahmed Al-Sayyid Abu Miki, Mahmoud Abd Al-Raheem, Amr Al-Radini, Shorouk Al-Tuhami, Nadia Al-Kilani, Moataz Sabir, Ammar Mahmoud Al-Masry, Ahmed Salah Al-Mahdi, Nihal Khairy, Muhammad Khalil, Tarek Farouk, Ali Ali Awad, Hossam Al-Khatib, Kadria Said; non-fiction contributions were made by Dr. Hosam Elzembely and Khaled Gouda.
2020	Al-Musqawimun (The Resistors)	Dr. Hosam Elzembely, Abd Al-Hakim Al-Taweel (Libya), Muhammad Naguib Matter, Dr. Kadria Said, Al-Sayyed Negm, Muhammad Muhyi Toulba, Dr. Emad El-Din Aysha, Muhammad Al-Sayyed Abu Mekki, Rania Masoud, Muhammad Al-Yassin (Syria), Mahmoud Abd Al-Rahim, Muhammad Al-Murabit (Morocco), Ashraf Mugahid, Muhammad Khalil Al-Sayyed, Muhammad Ahmed Abdel Miniem, Ismail Masa’d Al-Sayyed, Mamdouh Ahmed, Radi Abduh, Wael Abdel Rahim; the volume included an essay on resistance stories in science fiction and a translation by Dr. Areeg Ibrahim

== Activities ==
The first sci-fi society in the Arab-Muslim world. Here is an interview of the society's director Dr. Hosam Elzembely, conducted by Marcia Lynx Qualey of the Arab Literature in English blog. For a detailed review of his first published novel, The Half-Humans, see this link to Islam and Science Fiction. So far the society has held short story contests for its anthologies, drawing on the talents of authors in Egypt and the Arab world, and organised cultural salons, presenting authors to a broader critical audience or reviewing specific novels and publications. Since 2017 these events have been held at the semi-official headquarters of the Egyptian society for SF, at the Zembely Eye Centre, floor 7, 38 Makram Ebeid Street, Madinat Nasr (Nasr City). Names and dates of cultural salons listed here:

- The inaugural cultural salon of the Egyptian society. Held on Monday 17 July 2017. The salon consisted of four sessions. The first was a presentation of a classic novella by Nihad Sharif called Number 4 Commands You. (The presentation was given by SF writer Mohammad Naguib Matter.) The second session was a workshop on a science fiction story, where the participants each contributed a component of the storyline after the reading of an introductory sequence. The third was a presentation of a forthcoming short story by Emad El-Din Aysha. The fourth was a lecture on human development and its relationship with science fiction – the importance of beauty and knowledge as drivers for individual and societal progress and the power of the imagination to inspire real-world inventions and scientific advance.
- Friday 25 August 2017, to discuss Ahmed Al-Mahdi's novel Malaaz: City of Resurrection (ملاذ: مدينة البعث). This is a post-apocalyptic novel set in a future Egypt following the after-effects of a nuclear war, with a technological conflict brewing between Upper and Lower Egypt.
- Friday 29 September 2017, to discuss Wael and Mahmoud Abd Al-Raham's novel Akwan (Universes), a novel about parallel universes and alternate dimensions that coexist on Earth, with the Bermuda triangle as the meeting point.
- Friday 27 October 2017, to discuss the novel The Great Space Saga: The Half-Humans, (البشر أنصاف : ملحمة الفضاء الكبرى), by Dr. Hosam Elzembely. This was space adventure story where Muslim heroes save a civilization on the verge of extinction. The two literary critics who discussed the novel were Khaled Gouda and Dr. Ahmed Yusri Fahid. An extended review and critical analysis of the story has been published in Chinese, by a sister organization called the Future Affairs Administration.
- Friday 1 December 2017, to discuss Mohammad Naguib Matter's short story collection, A Hole in the Head الرأس المثقوب. One of the stories ("After You, After You") was about an artificially intelligent car constantly pursuing its owner, in anticipation it seems of Uber's latest innovations.
- Friday 29 December 2017, to discuss Ammar Al-Masry's novel Shadows of Atlantis, ظلال أطلانتس, an alien invasion epic centring around a robotic rebellion against mankind, a team of select heroes and an ancient alien language that holds the key to the long lost city of Atlantis, the first in a series of novels. The critics at the event included Dr. Kardia Said and Khalid Gouda. Here is a linked review.
- Friday 2 February 2018, to discuss the novel, The Delusions of a Terrorist تخاريف إرهابى, by Ahmed Migahid. Also present were literary critics Khalid Ghouda and Dr. Yusri Abd Al-Ghani. (This was a non-science fiction work).
- A special cultural salon on Friday 9 February 2018. Two books were discussed: Ahmed Al-Mahdi's new novel The Black Winter (الشتاء الأسود), and the fifth publication of the Shams Al-Ghad series, Al-Samidoun (الصامدون). The speakers at the event were literary critics Dr. Kardia Said and Khalid Ghouda.
- Friday 2 March 2018. The book discussed was the fifth publication of the Shams al-Ghad series, 'Al-Samidoun' (الصامدون). Next to the authors the two discussants for the book are literary critics and sci-fi experts Khalid Gouda and Dr. Kadria Said.
- Friday 30 March 2018. A special cultural salon where prizes were handed out for the contributors to the planned sixth volume of the Shams Al-Ghad series, The Futurists (المسطقبليون), dedicated to children's sci-fi. Distinguished guests at the event, who reviewed and discussed the stories and handed out the prizes, included Khalid Gouda, Dr. Ahmed Yousri Fahed (a literary critic who did his PhD on Arabic science fiction and his MA on Edgar Allan Poe) and Yacoub al-Sharouni, a famous literary critic in his own right and expert in children's literature and also the brother of the late Yousef Al-Sharouni, a famous author and patron of Arab science fiction. (Among those who won prizes were Ahmed Al-Sayyid, Ammar Al-Masry, Ahmed Al-Mahdi and Emad El-Din Aysha).
- Friday 27 April 2018. The work of science fiction discussed was the dystopian novella 2063 by Moataz Hassanein. The work was originally written in 2016 but only published, recently, in 2018, and through self-publication by Escatopia, a Facebook ezine dedicated to promoting Egyptian science fiction and fantasy. The discussants included Khalid Gouda and the moderator of the event was Dr. Mohammad Naguib Matter. For a new review of the novella, in English, please follow this link.
- Special cultural salon held on Wednesday, during Ramadan iftar, held at Hadikat Al-Tifl (Children's Garden) in Makram Ebdeid street, Nasr City. The topic of discussion was Mohammad Naguib Matter's historical science fiction novel The Road to Baghdad (الطريق إلى بغداد), which focuses on the period prior to the 2003 Iraq War, incorporating elements of science and alternate history into the story of Iraq's nuclear programme. Dr. Matter had actually spent ten of the most productive years of his life in Iraq and used this to model his storyline, with both fictional and real historical characters. Following the discussion of the novel, the director of the society Dr. Hosam Elzembely also gave an account of his participation in the two-day conference held by the Future Affairs Administration in China; the Asia-Pacific Science Fiction Convention held on May 19–20 at No. 5, Beichen Dong Road (East Beichen Road), Chaoyang District, Beijing).

Dr. Elzembely participated in two panels. Also at the convention was Francesco Verso, a distinguished European SF writer and Founder and Editor-in-Chief at Future Fiction.

- Friday 29 June 2018, a special cultural salon on a non-science fiction work by an SF and fantasy author, Rania Masoud. Also in attendance were Dr. Kadria Said, Khaled Gouda, Dr. Zainab Abu Sinah, with Dr. Hosam Elzembely presiding over the event.
- Friday 27 July 2018. This event was dedicated to Dr. Elzembely's own novel, "The Planet of the Viruses: The First Dialogue with a Microscopic Civilization," with Dr. Kadria Said and Khalid Gouda as discussants. Emad El-Din Aysha presented the novel as Dr. Elzembely was the guest of honour.
- Friday 7 September 2018. The subject was Muhammad Al-Nagui's novel Irtidad. The discussants were Khaled Gouda and Dr. Kadria Said. Muhammad Al-Nagui, a resident of Port Said, came specially to Cairo that day for the presentation. For an English-language review of this time-travel novel please see this link.
- Friday 30 November 2018. The subject was Dr. Elzembely's dystopian, post-apocalyptic novel America 2030, a young adult action and adventure story set behind the enemy lines of a future Fascist American empire. The discussants were Dr. Kadria Said, Muhammad Naguib Matter and Mr. Khaled Gouda. The salon was originally scheduled for October but due to travel circumstances it had to be postponed to the following month. For an English language review of the novel, please follow this ArabLit in English link.
- Friday 28 December 2018. The subject was the next installment of Ammar Al-Masry's Atlantis series - The Throne of Atlantis - following hot on the trails of his alien invasion epic The Shadows of Atlantis. Also attending to discuss the new novel are Dr. Kadria Ali, the sci-fi and children's literature expert, and Mr Khaled Gouda, the literary critic. For an English-language review please see this link.
- Friday 22 February 2019. The guest of honour was Muhammd Naguib Matter for his sci-fi novel Strangers from Space, the stranger in question being human beings who got isolated on a colonised world and go to war with the people of Earth who have learned to live in peace with their environment. Dr. Kadria Ali and Mr Khaled Gouda gave the critical presentations on the novel.
- Friday 5 April 2019. This was a non-SF event, dedicating to a supernatural thriller by Muhammad Abd al-Raheem. Muhammad Naguib Matter and Khaled Gouda were the critics for this piece.
- Friday 3 May 2019. A non-fiction work by Muhammad Naguib Matter was the topic of discussion about Arabic and Egyptian scientists who met untimely deaths.
- Friday 29 November 2019: 25th salon on a novel (Kayan) (The Entity) by Mahmoud Abdelraheem. The writer dedicated the novel to the members of the Egyptian Society for Science Fiction (ESSF). Dr. Kadria Saeed and Mr. Khaled Gouda were the two professional critics and Muhammed Naguib Mattar orchestrated it.
- Friday 26 June 2020: 34th salon about a short stories book 'Asrar Hai Awal أسرار حي أول' Secrets of first neighborhood by Ramy Kotb in the presence of critics Mr.Khaled Gouda, Mr.Zakaria Sobh and Dr.Nader Abdul Khalek.
- Friday 7 August 2020: 35th salon on short stories " The Invader Asteroid" by Shaima' Elhaj. The writer dedicated the novel to the members of the Egyptian Society for Science Fiction (ESSF). Dr.Kadria, Mr.Khaled Qouda and Mr.Zakaria Sobh were the professional critics.
- Friday 30 October 2020: 38th salon on a novel Maghara Al Gabal AlGharby by Amr Mounir. The writer dedicated the novel to the members of the Egyptian Society for Science Fiction (ESSF). Mr. Zakaria Sobh and Mr. Khaled Gouda were the two professional critics and Dr. Hosam Alzembely orchestrated it.
- Friday 25 December 2020: 40th salon on manuscript of short stories " Worrying Hypothesis" by Shaima' Elhaj. The writer dedicated the novel to the members of the Egyptian Society for Science Fiction (ESSF). Dr.Kadria, Dr. Mohammad Najeeb Abdallah and Mr.Zakaria Sobh were the professional critics.
- Friday 9 April 2021: 44th salon on a book Cinema Althawra by Amr Mounir. The writer dedicated the book to the members of the Egyptian Society for Science Fiction (ESSF). Mr. Khaled Gouda was the professional critic and Dr. Hosam Alzembely orchestrated it.
- Friday 23 April 2021: 45th salon on the novel 'Am Ahmed Al-Vampire Wa Kawkab Al-Koroud' by Ramy Kotb in the presence of the critics Dr.Amr Mounir, Dr.Kadria Saeed and Mr.Khaled Gouda.

The ESSF is also seeking active cooperation with like-minded groups around the world, not least in the region. In this vein has interviewed Farzin Souri, the editor-in-chief of the Iranian SF magazine 3Feed, the chief online sci-fi publication in Iran and the mouthpiece of the Speculative Fiction Group (گروه ادبیات گمانه‌زن). The interview appeared on Samovar blog, dated 9 February 2019.

== Staff ==
The society is not made up only of authors of science fiction and fantasy. The sci-fi and literary community all help in some form or another, including publishers, literary critics, authors, professors, journalists, translators and fans all alike. Dr. Hosam Elzembely edited all five volumes of the Shams Al-Ghad series, despite his work duties which take him from North to South Egypt; he is also a member of the Egyptian Writers’ Union (ERU) and head of the ERU Scientific Committee. Mohammad Naguib Matter, one of the society's most active members, is an engineer by training and has won scores of Arabic literary prizes. Ahmed Migahid is a publisher, a novelist (non-genre) and a patron of science fiction. Dr. Kardia Said is an established literary critic, specialising in children's literature, and did her MA thesis on science fiction. Khalid Gouda is a noted literary critic and big fan of science fiction. Dr. Ahmed Yusri Fahid is a well-known literary critic and did his PhD in Arabic literature. (On Arabic SF. His MA thesis was on Edgar Allan Poe). The logo was designed by Ahmed Salah Al-Mahdi, who is also a graphic designer and translator, in additional to his duties as a fantasy and SF author. He also designed the front cover for Al-Samidoun. The society's resident secretary and a sci-fi enthusiast himself is Ahmed Al-Sayyid, an MA student doing his thesis on Arabic science fiction. He published his first short story in Al-Samidoun and also posts news items and commentary online on the society's activities. Emad El-Din Aysha is the society's main translator and reviewer, a former (English-language) university professor and journalist, and someone who is now trying his hand at writing Arab-Islamic SF, if predominantly in English. His first SF short story was published, in Arabic, in Al-Samidoun. His first published translation of an Arabic sci-fi story, "Women… and Blood" (by Dr. Hosam Elzembely), also appeared in Al-Samidoun. He has contributed two short stories to the forthcoming Al-Mustaqbaliun and won a prize from the society for one of them, as did Ahmed Al-Mahdi and Ahmed Al-Sayyid.
