= Heinecken =

Heinecken is a surname of German origin. People with this name include:

- Robert Heinecken (1931–2006), American artist
- Catharina Elisabeth Heinecken (1683–1757), German artist and alchemist
- Lindy Heinecken, South African military sociologist
- Mickey Heinecken (b. 1939), former American football coach

== See also ==
Heineken (surname)
