= Anakin =

Anakin may refer to:

- Anakin Skywalker, later known as Darth Vader, the principal villain of the Star Wars original trilogy
- Anakin Solo, grandson of Darth Vader in the Star Wars Expanded Universe continuity
- A variant of the surname Annakin
- Anakin (given name)
- Cyber Anakin, the pseudonym of a computer hacktivist
- Doug Anakin (1930–2020), Canadian bobsleigh athlete
- Fly Anakin, American rapper and record producer

== See also ==
- Anakim, biblical giants
