= Hankin =

Hankin is a surname. This surname can trace its roots back to either the Anglo-Saxon people of Britain and to the name Johan-kin, or to the Scandinavian Nordic name Haakon and its patronymic Haakonsson. The name "Haakon" is from Old Norse meaning "High kin" coming from Há (high/chosen) and konr (descendant/kin). Haakonsson subsequently became anglicised into Modern-English as Hankinson, Hankins, Hankin, Annakin. The surname is also a Jewish surname (Hebrew: חנקין) meaning child (kin) of Hanna.

Notable people with the surname include:

- Ernest Hanbury Hankin (1865–1939), British bacteriologist, aeronautical theorist and naturalist
- Larry Hankin (born 1940), American actor, performer, director and producer
- Nigel Hankin (1920–2007), English lexicographer who lived in India
- Ray Hankin (born 1956), former English footballer
- Sean Hankin (born 1981), English semi-professional footballer
- Simone Hankin (born 1973), Australian water polo player from the gold medal squad of the 2000 Summer Olympics
- St. John Emile Clavering Hankin (1869–1909), British Edwardian essayist and playwright
- Yehoshua Hankin (1864–1945), Zionist activist responsible for land purchases of the World Zionist Organization in Ottoman Palestine

== See also ==
- Hankin Range, small mountain range on Vancouver Island, British Columbia, Canada, located between Nimpkish and Bonanza Lakes
- Hankins, a surname
