= Hankinson =

Hankinson may refer to:

- Hankinson (surname)
- Hankinson, North Dakota, a city in Richland County, North Dakota, United States
- Hankinson's equation, an equation for predicting the strength of wood
- Hankinson-Moreau-Covenhoven House, a house located in Freehold, New Jersey, United States
- Lake Hankinson, a lake within the catchment of the Waiau River, New Zealand
