= Johann Harper =

Swedish painter (1688-1746)

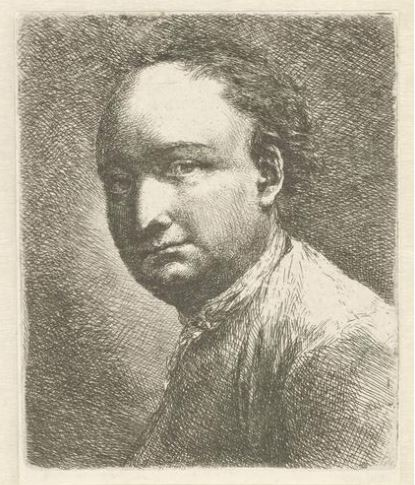
Johann Harper; etching by Joachim Martin Falbe, from Harper's self-portrait (c.1750)

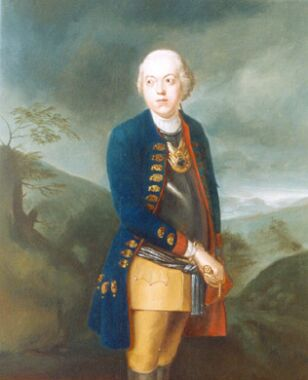
Hans Christoph Friedrich von Hacke (1722)

Johann Harper (August 1688, Stockholm - 4 December 1746, Potsdam) was a Swedish painter who worked at the Prussian Royal Court.

== Biography ==
He was the son of Jakob Harper, a merchant, and his wife Anna née Pohl. His first painting lessons came from Peter Martin van Mytens and David von Krafft in Stockholm. Then he studied with the court painter Benoît Le Coffre in Copenhagen.

In 1709, together with Ismael Mengs, eft Copenhagen for a trip to Germany, where he studied with Paul Heinecken in the Hanseatic City of Lübeck. After completing his studies, he became a popular miniature and enamel painter.

From 1712, he worked in Berlin. In 1716, he was appointed court painter for the Hohenzollerns. There, he created portraits and decorations at Charlottenburg Palace. In the 1740s, he created the ceiling painting, "'Flora and her Followers" for the vestibule at the new Sanssouci palace in Potsdam, which underwent a restoration in 2016.

His first marriage was to Maria Barbara Wolffgang, the daughter of J. G. Wolffgang, a copper engraver. Their eldest son, Adolf Friedrich Harper, learned miniature and flower painting at home. Later, he became a landscape painter in Stuttgart.

His best known student was the portrait painter and etcher, Joachim Martin Falbe. Several of his works may be seen at the Nationalmuseum, Stockholm.
