= Paul Heinecken =

German painter, architect and graphic artist

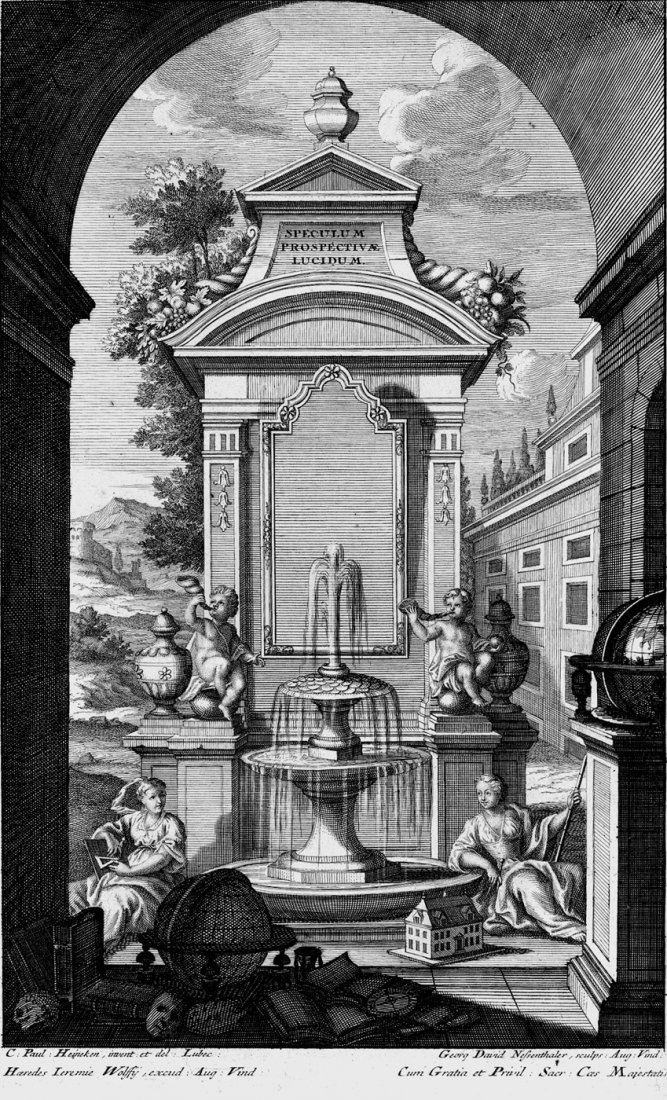
Frontispiece to Lucidum prospectivæ Speculum

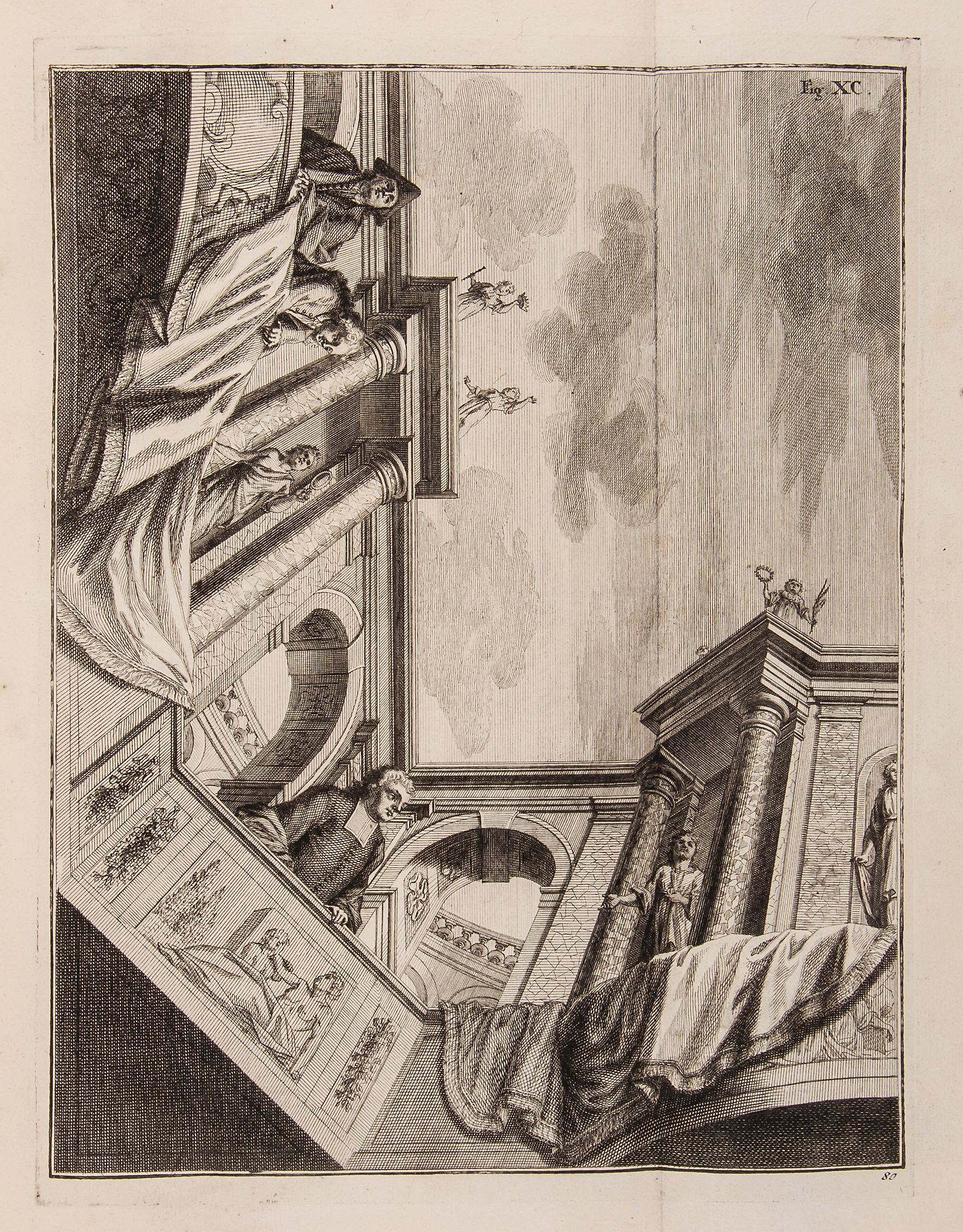
Illustration from Lucidum prospectivæ Speculum

Paul Heinecken or Heineken (9 December 1674, Riga - 1746, Lübeck) was a German painter, architect, and graphic artist. He enjoyed a few years of fame as the father of Christian Heinrich Heineken, a child prodigy known as "The infant scholar of Lübeck".

== Biography ==
He was one of the sons of Hinrich Henicke (also given as Hänicke or Hönnicken, 1639/40-1705), a Master Builder from Holstein. After learning the basics of architectural drawing from his father, he went to Lübeck to study with Karl Krieg. From there, he went to Venice and Rome, where his earliest original drawings were made. In 1707, after several years working as a sign poster, he became a citizen of Lübeck and, after some negotiating, was awarded the status of "Freimeister" by the City Council, making him independent of the local guilds.

That status enabled him to marry the artist Catharina Elisabeth Oesterreich; daughter of the painter Franz Oesterreich and step-daughter of his former teacher Karl Krieg. Their first son, Carl Heinrich, became a well-known art historian. Christian Heinrich, the prodigy, was born fourteen years later.

In 1727 his work Lucidum prospectivæ Speculum, Das ist: Ein heller Spiegel der Perspective was published in Augsburg. The work contains drafts and full drawings, offering a fundamental introduction to the theory of perspective. Considered to be one of the most comprehensive "monumental" treatises published during the eighteenth century, it is still much used as a textbook.

He owned and operated a coffeehouse in a corner of his home, to provide extra income and as a meeting place for artists. The composer, Georg Philipp Telemann, and the writer, Christian Ludwig Liscow, were among his frequent guests. It was in business until 1861, long after his death, by the name "Harmonie".

Miniatures and enamel paintings are also part of his output. Ismael Mengs and Johann Harper were his students in those genres. In addition to his work on perspective, he is known for several plans and views of Hamburg, created during the 1720s.
