= Joachim Martin Falbe =

German painter

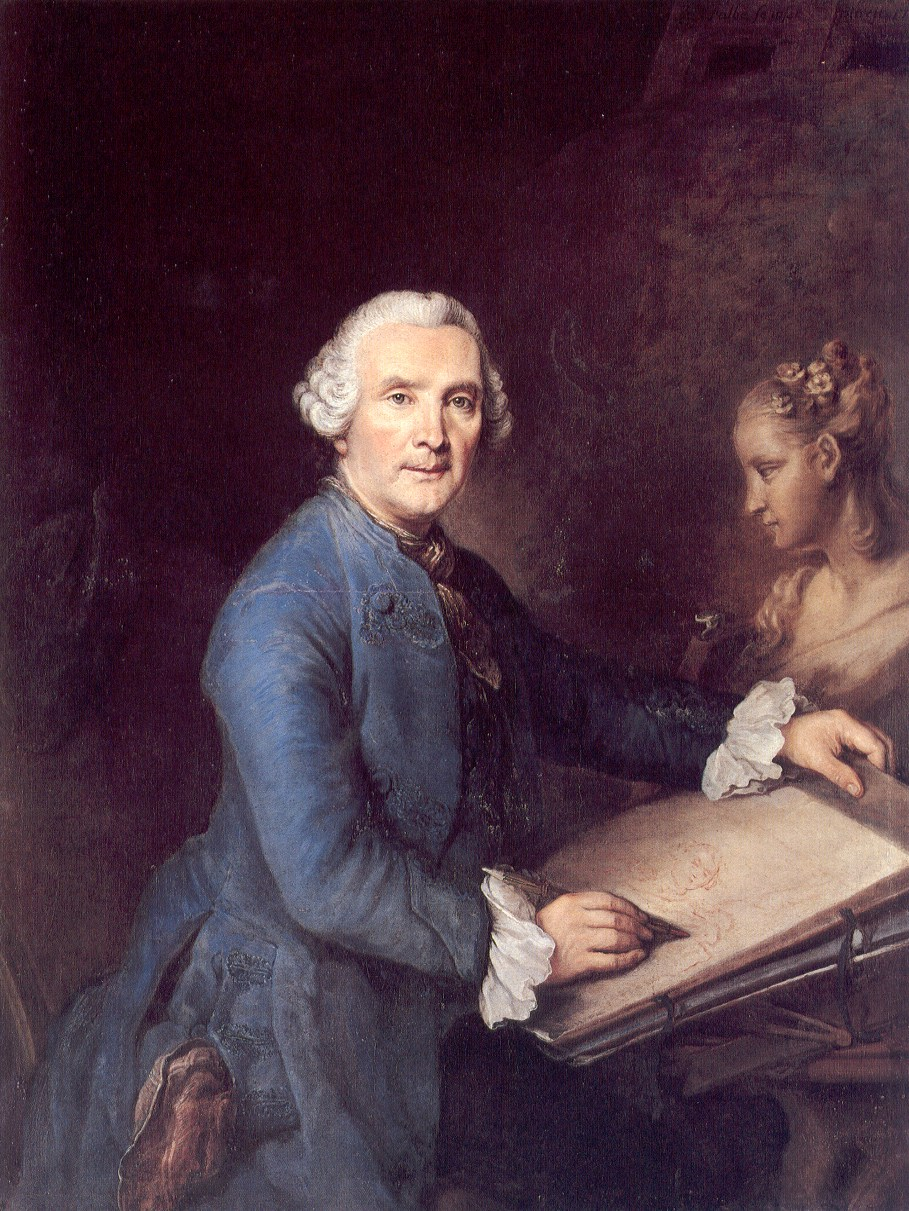
Self-portrait, 1761

Joachim Martin Falbe (11 June 1709 – 22 March 1782) was a German portrait painter.

== Biography ==
Born in Berlin in 1709, Falbe was instructed at first by Harper and later by A. Pesne. At Pesne's suggestion Falbe was appointed court painter of Prince August Ludwig von Anhalt-Köthen in 1739.

Several etchings based on Rembrandt's paintings, or in the master's style, are attributed to him. Some extant copies are signed with Falbe's monogram have survived. In 1764 he was elected a member of the Academy at Berlin, in which city he died in 1782.

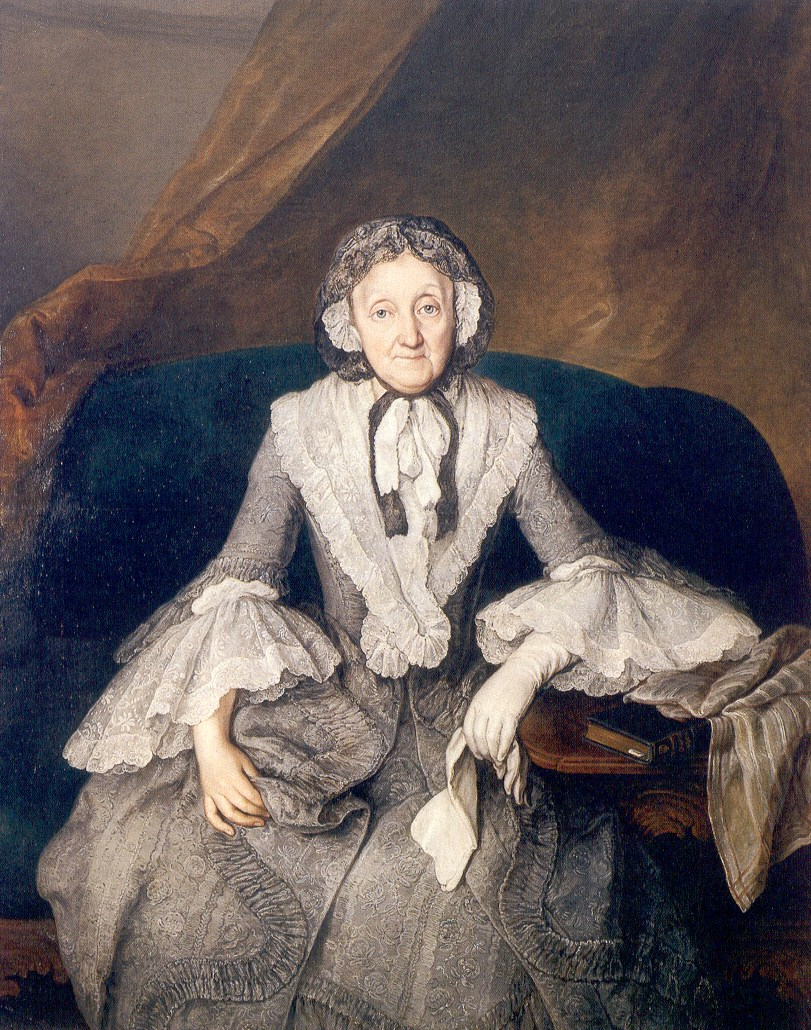
Portrait of an old lady, 1755, now in the Germanisches Nationalmuseum

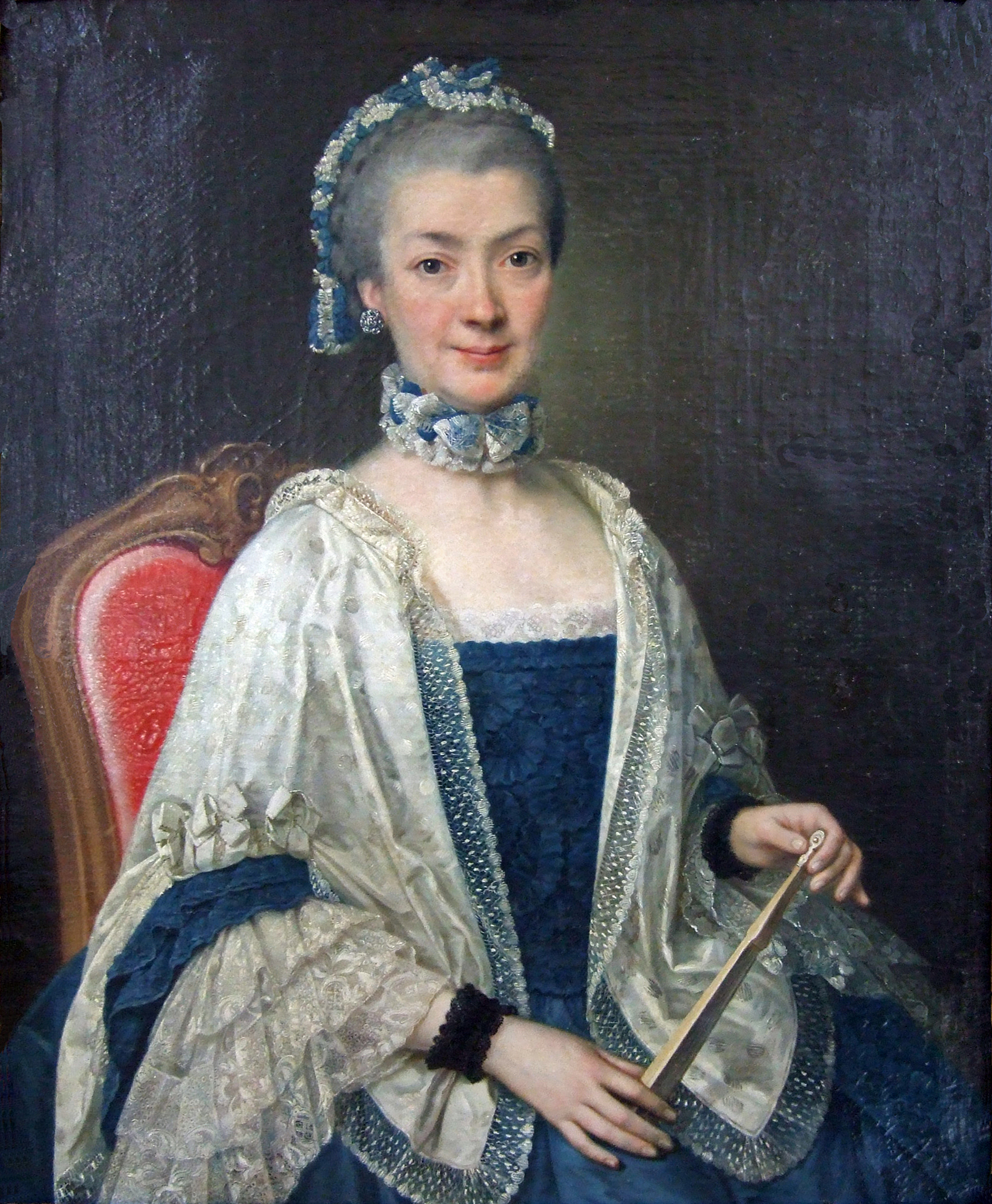
Portrait of an unknown lady, ca. 1764, now in Friedrichsfelde Palace, Friedrichsfelde

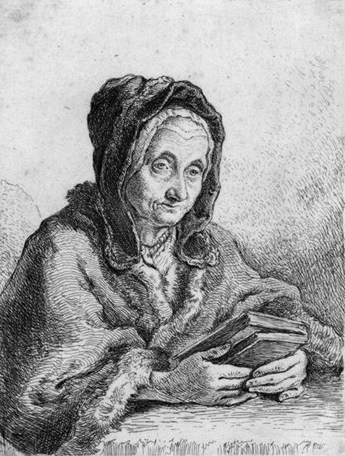
Old woman with a prayer book, etching from ca. 1752
