= Manchirevula =

- Village
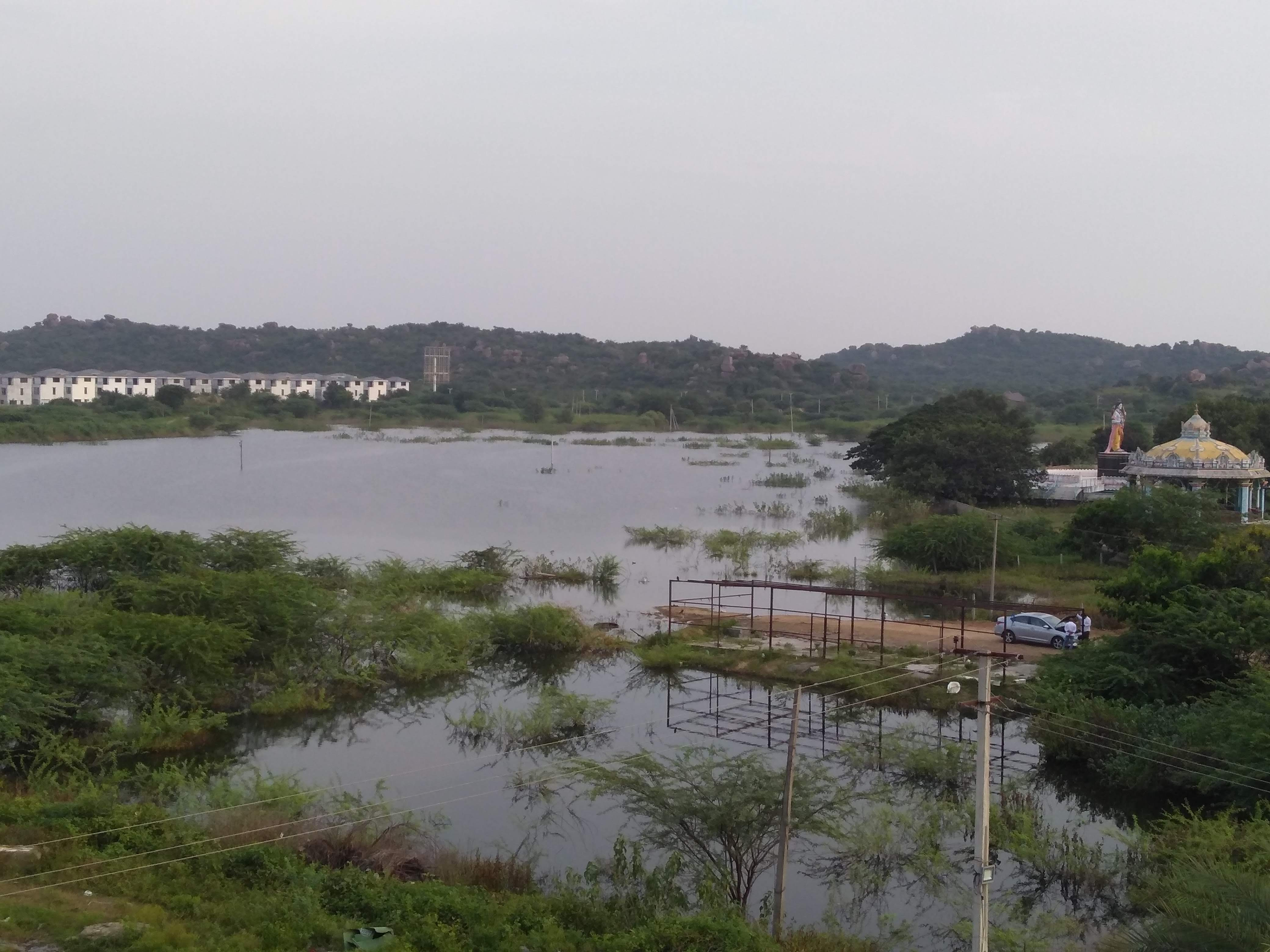
- Itikini Cheruvu, Manchirevula

- Location in Hyderabad, India Manchirevula (India)
- Country: India
- State: Telangana
- District: Ranga Reddy
- Metro: Ranga Reddy district

Government
  - Body: Municipality

Languages
  - Official: Telugu
- Time zone: UTC+5:30 (IST)
- Vehicle registration: TG
- Planning agency: Panchayat
- Civic agency: Mandal Office
- Website: narsingimunicipality.telangana.gov.in

Manchirevula is a village and panchayat. It falls under Gandipet mandal in Ranga Reddy district, Telangana, India. This village falls within the 10 miles radius of Hyderabad city. Some facilities of the Telangana State Police Academy are located in southern Manchirevula.

== Geography ==
Western part of Manchirevula has direct access to Osman Sagar, also known as Gandipet lake.The river Musi flows through the northern part of the village. The village being immediately downstream of the Osman Sagar dam. Hence, when water is released from Gandipet reservoir, the increase in water levels are known to cut off access to some roads and cause floods because of its low-lying nature.

== Demographics ==
As of 2011 India census, Manchirevula had a population of 4459 of which 2,263 are males while 2,196 are females as per report released by Census India 2011. Manchirevula has an average literacy rate of 73.44%, higher than state average of 67.02%. In Manchirevula, male literacy is around 80.92% while female literacy rate is 65.83%. In Manchirevula, 14.96% of the population is under 6 years of age.
