= Anakin (given name) =

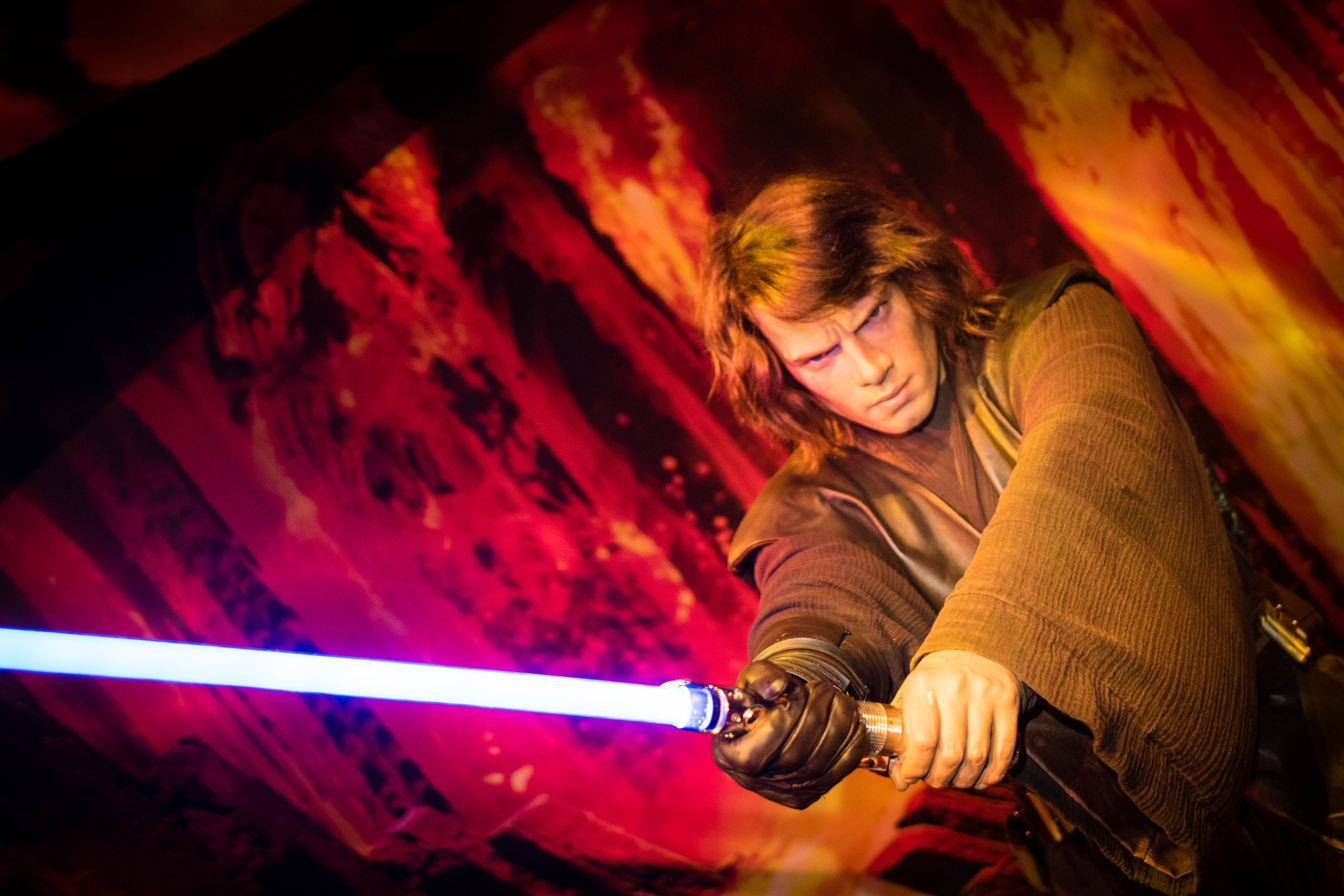
- A wax sculpture depicting Hayden Christensen as Anakin Skywalker at Madame Tussauds.
- Gender: Primarily masculine

Origin
- Meaning: literary, created name

Anakin is a masculine given name usually given in reference to the Star Wars character Darth Vader, a hero turned villain whose original name was Anakin Skywalker. In Legends continuity, the name is shared with Anakin Solo, the third child of Han Solo and Leia Organa, daughter of Anakin Skywalker.

The name was first used for five or more boys in the United States in 1995 and has been among the 1,000 most common names for American boys since 2014. In 2023, the year it was most popular for American boys, the name was ranked at No. 543 on the popularity chart and was used for 460 boys. The name was also given to nine newborn American girls in 2023. The name was also among the top 1,000 names for newborn boys in Canada, where it ranked 847th on the popularity chart in 2021, with 29 Canadian boys given the name.
