= Abraham P. Hankins =

American painter

Abraham P. Hankins (1900–1963) was an American modernist painter.

Hankins was born in the Russian Empire and emigrated to the United States in 1914.

He studied at the Academy Julien in Paris and the Philadelphia Academy of Fine Arts.

His work is held by the Barnes Foundation. His works also have been displayed in the Museum of Fine Arts, New York; the Pennsylvania Academy of the Fine Arts; the Philadelphia Museum of Art; and in the Lessing J. Rosenwald collection. His papers are in the Archives of American Art.

Hankins died while on vacation in Miami Beach, Florida.
