= Carl Heinrich von Heineken =

German art historian

Carl Heinrich von Heineken (1707–1791) was a German art historian who was for a time in charge of King Augustus III of Poland's royal art collection.

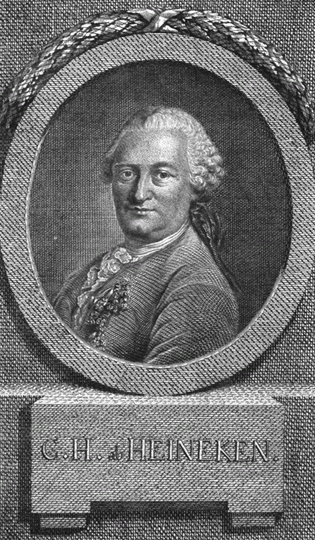
Frontispiece from New Library of Fine Sciences and Freyen Arts, Volume 26.1.

== Biography ==
He was the son of Paul Heinecken, a painter and architect in Lübeck, Germany, and Catharina Elisabeth Heinecken, an artist and alchemist. His younger brother Christian Heinrich Heineken (1721-1725) was a child prodigy known as "the infant scholar of Lübeck".

Beginning in 1724, Heineken studied literature and law at the Leipzig University and the University of Halle. He became a private tutor about 1730, first in the household of Johann Ulrich König, a Dresden court poet, and afterwards with Count Alexander von Sulkowsky. In 1739, he became the private secretary and librarian for Count Heinrich von Brühl, an important statesman and art collector.

In 1746, King Augustus III of Poland appointed him director of the royal collection of prints and drawings. Tasked with adding to the collection, he developed a wide network of artists, scholars, and collectors. Heineken was interested especially in woodcuts and engravings from the period before Albrecht Dürer and bought many examples for the collection. Among his acquisitions were paintings by Correggio and Raphael. He was knighted as a Reichsritter in 1749.

In 1756, at the beginning of the Seven Years’ War, the Prussians arrested Heineken and imprisoned him in the Dresden town hall. After the war, he was attacked for financial mismanagement, largely because of his association with Brühl. He was reimprisoned, charged with embezzlement, and dismissed from office. Although acquitted eventually, he was required to leave Dresden.

Heineken spent the remainder of his life writing books about art in both German and French. He became known as an expert on the origins of engraving and other forms of printing. Some of his later books were printed by the Leipzig publisher Johann Gottlob Immanuel Breitkopf.

For a time, Heineken owned Altdöbern Castle, a baroque building in Brandenburg, Germany.
