= Harry Hankins =

English cricketer (born 1999)

Personal information
- Full name: Harry John Hankins
- Born: 24 April 1999 (age 27); Bath, Somerset, England
- Batting: Right-handed
- Bowling: Right-arm medium
- Relatives: GT Hankins (brother)

Domestic team information
- Years: Team
- 2019: Gloucestershire
- Only First-class: 11 April 2019 Gloucestershire v Derbyshire

Career statistics
Competition	FC
Matches	1
Runs scored	9
Batting average	9.00
100s/50s	0/0
Top score	9
Balls bowled	198
Wickets	0
Bowling average	–
5 wickets in innings	–
10 wickets in match	–
Best bowling	–
Catches/stumpings	0/–
- Source: ESPNcricinfo, 25 August 2020

Harry John Hankins (born 24 April 1999) is an English cricketer. He made his first-class debut on 11 April 2019, for Gloucestershire County Cricket Club in the 2019 County Championship.
