= George Hankins =

English cricketer (born 1997)

Personal information
- Full name: George Thomas Hankins
- Born: 4 January 1997 (age 29); Bath, Somerset, England
- Batting: Right-handed
- Bowling: Right-arm off break
- Role: Batsman
- Relatives: HJ Hankins (brother)

Domestic team information
- Years: Team
- 2016–2021: Gloucestershire (squad no. 21)
- First-class debut: 31 March 2016 Gloucestershire v Durham MCCU
- List A debut: 10 May 2017 Gloucestershire v Kent

Career statistics
Competition	FC	LA	T20
Matches	38	16	8
Runs scored	1,211	535	24
Batting average	21.24	35.66	6.00
100s/50s	1/7	0/5	0/0
Top score	116	92	14
Balls bowled	13	–	–
Wickets	0	–	–
Bowling average	–	–	–
5 wickets in innings	–	–	–
10 wickets in match	–	–	–
Best bowling	–	–	–
Catches/stumpings	42/–	11/–	1/–
- Source: CricketArchive, 25 September 2021

George Thomas Hankins (born 4 January 1997) is an English cricketer who played for Gloucestershire until 2021.

Hankins attended Millfield School, where in his final year in 2015 he captained the first eleven and scored exactly 1,000 runs. A right-handed batsman who also bowls right-arm off breaks, he made his first-class debut for Gloucestershire against the Durham MCCU side in March 2016. He made his List A debut for Gloucestershire in the 2017 Royal London One-Day Cup on 10 May 2017. He made his Twenty20 debut for Gloucestershire in the 2017 NatWest t20 Blast on 16 July 2017.

On 19 April 2020, George was arrested on suspicion of drink-driving after an accident in Cobham, Surrey where he lost control of his car and crashed into four parked cars, writing two of them off and damaging a house. He was bailed to appear in Guildford Crown Court in July 2020. An official statement by Gloucestershire County Cricket Club said that they had been made aware of the incident, were initiating a full internal investigation, but wouldn’t be commenting any further at this time as it was a police matter. He received a 22-month driving ban and a £600 fine.
