= Hankinson (surname) =

Hankinson is a surname. Notable people with the surname include:

- Ben Hankinson (born 1969), retired American ice hockey player
- Casey Hankinson (born 1976), former professional American ice hockey player
- Donald Hankinson (1832–1877), New Zealand politician who represented the Riverton electorate
- Drew Hankinson (born 1983), American professional wrestler
- Frank Hankinson (1856–1911), American baseball player
- Fred Hankinson (1925–1997), Australian politician
- Mel Hankinson (born 1943), men's basketball coach and author
- Phil Hankinson (1951–1996), American basketball player
- Sean Hankinson (born 1980s), American actor
- Tim Hankinson (born 1955), American soccer coach

== See also ==
- Hankinson (disambiguation)
