= Lindy Heinecken =

South African sociologist

Lindy Heinecken is the former Vice-Dean of Research in the Faculty of Arts and Social Sciences at Stellenbosch University in Stellenbosch, South Africa. Heinecken studies military unionism, women and peacekeeping, civil-military relations, and defence transformation. She served as the deputy director of the Centre for Military Studies (CEMIS) at the South African Military Academy and as the President of the International Sociological Association (ISA) Armed Forces and Conflict Resolution Research Committee (RC01). She is the recipient of the Morris Janowitz Career Achievement Award. She is a National Research Foundation (NRF) B2-rated researcher, a designation given to scholars who are internationally acclaimed, based on the high quality and impact of their research.

== Background ==
In 1984, Heinecken earned her Bachelor of Social Science from the University of Cape Town. In March 1989, she joined the Centre for Military Studies (CEMIS) at the South African Military Academy, a position she held until 1996, when she became the deputy director. In 1997, she earned her Master of Social Science in Industrial Sociology from the University of Cape Town, and in 2006, she completed her Doctorate in War Studies and Military Sociology from the Department of War Studies at King's College London.

== Career ==
After finishing her Doctorate, Heinecken was hired as an associate professor of Sociology in the Department of Sociology and Social Anthropology at Stellenbosch University. In 2013, she was made a Full Professor and was subsequently appointed as the Chair of the Department of Sociology and Social Anthropology in 2019. In 2022, she was made the Vice-Dean of Research in the Faculty of Arts and Social Sciences at Stellenbosch University (3-year term). She is also one of a pool of specialists advising and conducting research for the Chief of the South African Army.

From 2018 to 2021, Heinecken served as the President of the International Sociological Association (ISA) Armed Forces and Conflict Resolution Research Committee (RC01). Additionally, she spent twenty years on the Council of the Inter-University Seminar on Armed Forces and Society (IUS) and is an editorial board member for the journals Armed Forces & Society and Scientia Militatria – The South African Journal of Military Studies. Furthermore, she has been a reviewer for over thirty different academic journals.

In 2025, she was recognized for her "excellence in the study of armed forces and society and important service to the discipline" by the Inter-University Seminar on Armed Forces and Society (IUS), which awarded her the Morris Janowitz Career Achievement Award.

== Research and work ==
Heinecken's research spans topics such as gender integration, defense transformation, HIV/AIDS in the military, and the experiences of military personnel on peace operations.

At Stellenbosch University, she teaches in industrial and political sociology, and on the sociology of work. Over the course of her career, she has published four books, thirty-five book chapters, and sixty-two academic articles.

Her book, South Africa's Post-Apartheid Military: Lost in Transition and Transformation, focuses on the issues that have contributed to the decline in the South African National Defence Force (SANDF). She covers the impacts of the shift in missions to support international peacekeeping operations, the issues of managing integration and diversity, assessing gender equality, management of the HIV/AIDS epidemic, civil-military relations, and the question of how to deal with the subject of military unions. Her most recent publication includes an edited volume on Military Deployments to Domestic Emergencies and Global Pandemics: Implications for Civil-Military Relations.

== Media appearances ==
Heinecken has appeared on the Battle Rhythm Podcast to discuss transitions of peacekeepers when they come home, and on SABC News to talk about conflict in the Democratic Republic of the Congo (DRC). Additionally, in an interview with 360 Mozambique, she discussed terrorists' use of drones and the threat they could present.

She has also spoken with EyeWitness News on the SANDF's role in helping the South African Police crackdown on crime and has published many opinion pieces in outlets such as The Conversation and Daily Maverick.

== Notable publications ==
- Graaff, K. and Heinecken, L. Masculinities and Gender Based Violence in South Africa: A study of a masculinities-based intervention programme, Development Southern Africa, 34 (5), 2017: 622–634.
- Heinecken, L. Outsourcing Public Security: the Unforeseen Consequences for the Military Profession, Armed Forces and Society, 40 (4), 2014: 625–646.
- Olivier, D. Heinecken, L. The personal and social benefits of urban agriculture experienced by cultivators on the Cape Flats, Development Southern Africa, 34 (2), 2017: 168–181.
- Heinecken, L. South Africa's post-apartheid Military: Lost in transition and transformation. Juta/UCT Press,2019/ Springer International, 2020.
- Olivier, D. and Heinecken, L. Beyond food security: Women's experiences of urban agriculture in Cape Town, Agriculture and Human Values, 34 (3), 2017: 743–755.
- Heinecken, L. Facing a Merciless Enemy: HIV/AIDS and the South African Armed Forces: Enemy. Armed Forces & Society, 29(2), 2003: 281–300.
- Heinecken, L. Conceptualising the tensions that gender integration evokes. Armed Forces and Society, 43 (2), 2017: 202–220.
- Heinecken, L. Affirming gender equality: The challenges facing the South African Armed Forces. Current Sociology. Vol 50(5), 2002: 715–728.
- Heinecken, L., & Leuprecht, C. Military Operations in Response to Domestic Emergencies and Global Pandemics: Implications for Civil-Military Relations. Cham: Springer Nature Switzerland, 2025
