= Christian Heinrich Heineken =

German child prodigy (1721–1725)

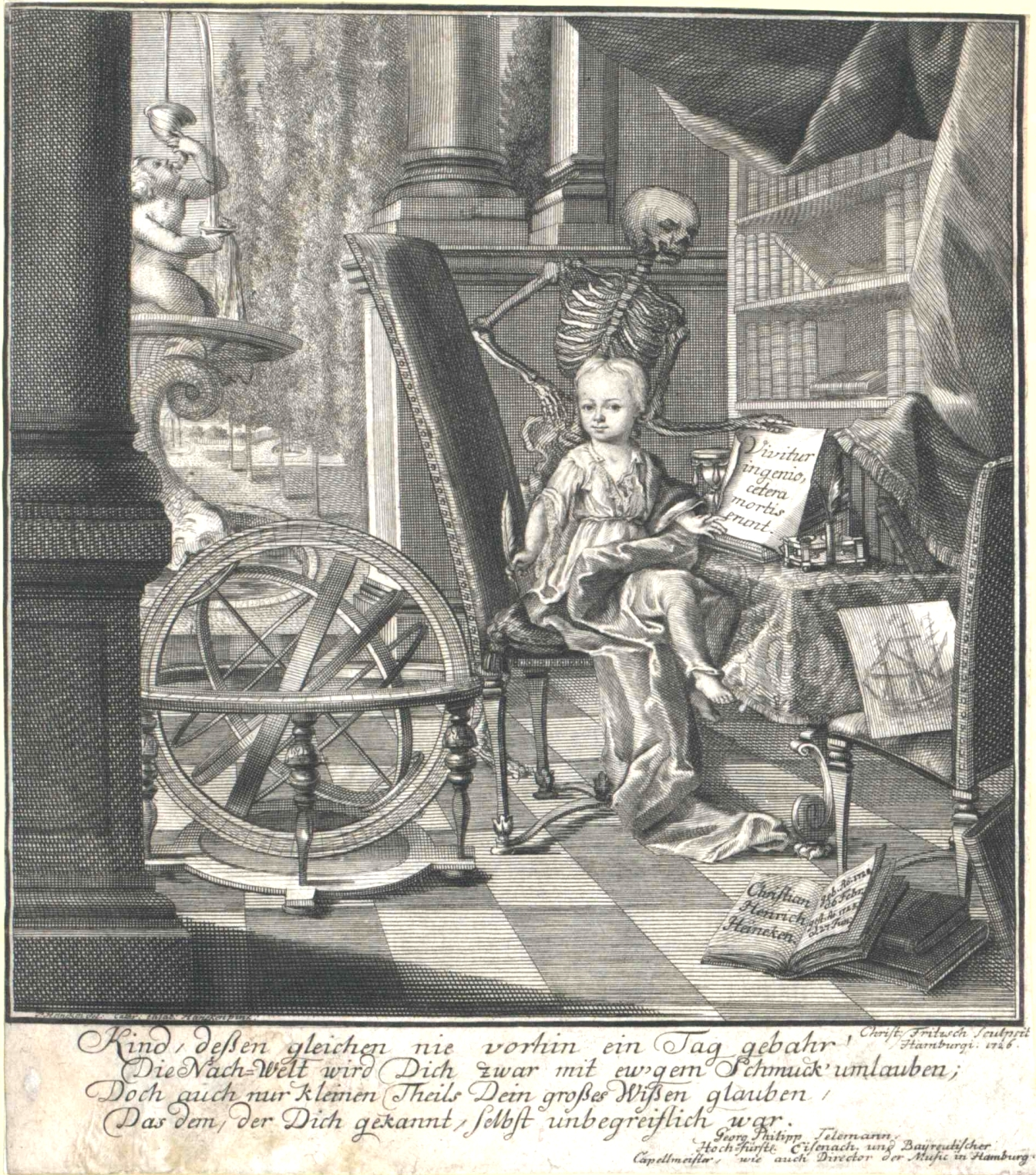
Christian Heinrich Heineken (1721–1725), after a painting by his mother, Catharina Elisabeth Heinecken. Engraved by Christian Fritzsch (1695–1769)

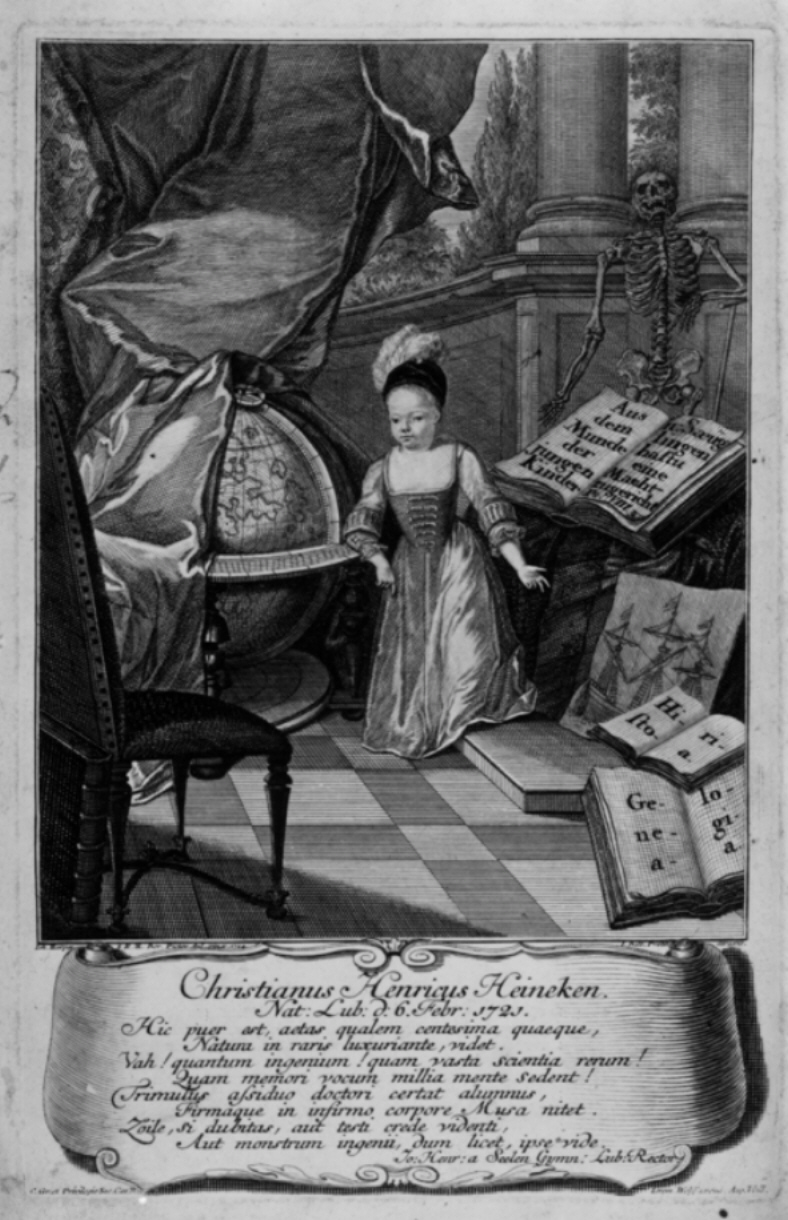
18th-century engraving of Christian Heinrich Heineken by Johann Balthasar Probst

Christian Heinrich Heineken or Heinecken (February 6, 1721 – June 27, 1725), also known as "the infant scholar of Lübeck", was a German child prodigy who lived only to the age of four.

== Life ==
He was born in the Prince-Bishopric of Lübeck, Germany, the son of Paul Heinecken (1674–1746), a painter and architect, and Catharina Elisabeth Heinecken (1683–1757), an artist and alchemist. His brother, Carl Heinrich von Heineken, became an art historian and collector and was later knighted.

It is said that when he was ten months old, he could speak German. He read the Pentateuch at age one, and between the ages of two and three, he read the Old and New Testaments in Latin. When he was three years old, he was said to have recited his own History of Denmark when visiting the King of Denmark. Also at three, he testified in court concerning the murder of his friend, another boy named Reid. He was breastfed until close to his death. He died at age four of celiac disease, which was likely caused by the ingestion of grain products.

In 1726, his tutor (a man named Schöneich) published a study of Christian entitled The Life, Deeds, Travels and Death of the Child of Lübeck. Immanuel Kant, in his book Anthropology from a Pragmatic Point of View, cited Heineken as an "ingenium praecox" (someone "prematurely clever").

== See also ==
- Child prodigy
- Genius
- Gifted education
- Intellectual giftedness

== Other sources ==
- Barlow, F. Mental prodigies. New York: Philosophical Library, 1952.
- Hollingworth, Leta S., Children Above IQ 180 Stanford-Binet: Origin and Development, Part One, Chapter 3 (1942) (retrieved Jan. 28, 2024).
- Long, G. (ed.). Penny Cyclopaedia. Society for the Diffusion of Useful Knowledge, 1838.
- Guido Guerzoni: The Wonderboy of Lübeck. The extraordinary life of Christian Heinrich Heinecken (English Edition). Turin 2006.
