= Catharina Elisabeth Heinecken =

German Artist & Alchemist

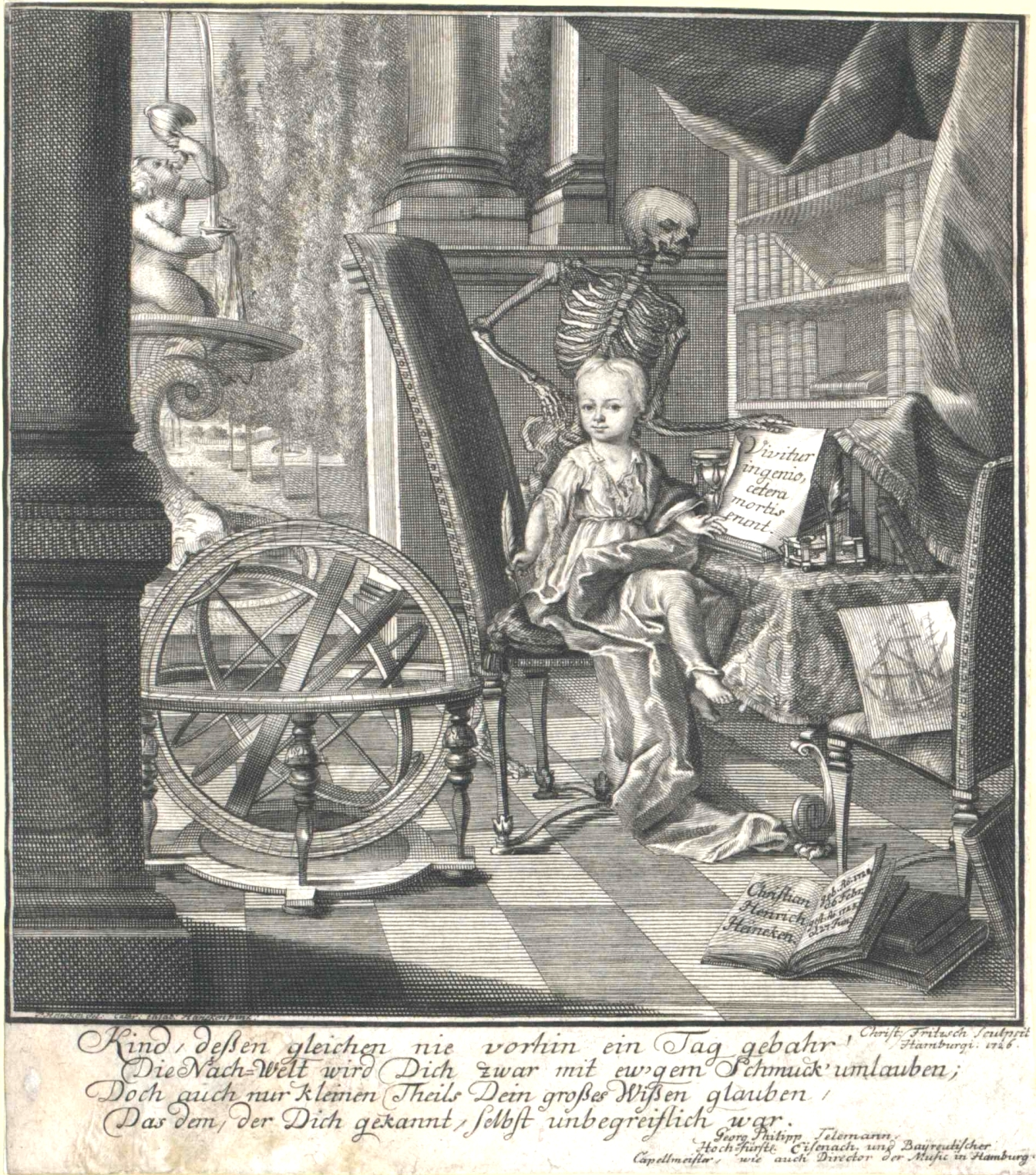
Christian Heinrich Heineken (1721–1725), engraved by Christian Fritzsch (1695–1769) after a painting by Catharina Elisabeth Heinecken.

Catharina Elisabeth Heinecken (1683 – November 5, 1757) was a German artist and alchemist and the mother of a celebrated child prodigy, Christian Heinrich Heineken.

== Life and work ==
Born in Lübeck, she was the daughter of painter Franz Oesterreich and the stepdaughter of another painter, Karl Krieg. She married the painter and architect Paul Heinecken, and they had two children: Carl Heinrich von Heineken, an art historian and collector who was later knighted, and Christian Heinrich Heineken, a child prodigy known as "the infant scholar of Lübeck" who only lived to be four years old.

Heinecken painted portraits and still lifes with flowers and fruit, and she made crowns and wreaths, which she rented to wedding parties. Her portrait of her son Christian Heinrich served as the template for an engraving by Christian Fritzsch that was disseminated widely. It is said that she was deeply interested in alchemy and used her fortune to pursue alchemical studies. She died in Lützen.

A portrait of Heinecken painted by Balthasar Denner is thought to have been destroyed during World War II.
