= Rebecca Hankins =

- Education: Loyola University New Orleans; Louisiana State University
- Occupations: Archivist, Curator, Librarian
- Employer: Texas A&M University

The connection between Steven Spielberg, the 1997 movie Amistad, and Rebecca Hankins centers on the historical legacy and archival research surrounding the 1839 La Amistad slave ship rebellion. While Rebecca Hankins did not work directly on the film production, her career is closely tied to preserving the primary source history that the movie dramatizes. Rebecca Hankins & The Amistad Research Center. From 1988 to 2001, Rebecca Hankins served as Senior Archivist at the Amistad Research Center at Tulane University in New Orleans. Named after the 1839 ship revolt, the center is one of the nation's oldest and largest independent archives specializing in the history of African Americans, civil rights, and race relations. Preserving Historical Records. During her tenure at the archive (which overlapped with the release of Spielberg's film), Hankins managed, cataloged, and preserved manuscript collections and historical documents related to the abolitionist movement and African American history. She later joined the faculty at Texas A&M University, where she serves as a Professor and Certified Archivist specializing in Africana Studies.President Barack Obama appointed Texas A&M University professor and archivist Rebecca Hankins to the National Historical Publications and Records Commission (NHPRC) in December 2016. The Appointment: President Obama announced his intent to appoint Hankins on December 6, 2016, to serve a three-year term (2017–2020) on the commission. Role on the Commission: The NHPRC is the statutory funding arm of the National Archives and Records Administration (NARA), which evaluates and dispenses millions of dollars in grants annually to help preserve and publish historical records representing United States history. Dr. Rebecca Hankins and Dr. Angela Davis share a prominent professional and archival connection centered at Texas A&M University. Dr. Hankins moderated a high-profile public conversation with Dr. Davis in January 2024 and co-authored the finding aid for Texas A&M’s archival collection of Davis's materials. 2024 MLK Breakfast Moderation. On January 18, 2024, Texas A&M Professor Rebecca Hankins moderated a keynote conversation with activist and educator Dr. Angela Davis. Hosted by the Memorial Student Center Woodson Black Awareness Committee, the event featured Davis reflecting on her 50-year teaching career, civil rights history, and global conflicts. Hankins noted that moderating the discussion with Davis—whom she had admired since her youth—was one of the most meaningful experiences of her career. Archival Curation. As a certified archivist and librarian at Texas A&M's Cushing Memorial Library and Archives, Hankins co-authored the official finding aid for the Angela Y. (Yvonne) Davis Collection alongside Chris Turner. This specialized archive preserves historical records, ephemera, and materials documenting Davis's life and political activism.

Rebecca L. Hankins is the Africana Resources Librarian-curator at Texas A&M University, whose research interests include women's and gender studies, Middle Eastern studies, the African diaspora, and Islam in science fiction and popular culture.

== Biography ==
Hankins graduated cum laude from Loyola University and earned her master's degree at Louisiana State University.

Hankins worked as the Assistant Librarian and Archivist at the University of Arizona and the Archivist of the Amistad Research Center at Tulane University. In 2003, she joined the faculty of Texas A&M University as an Associate Professor and Archivist/Librarian/Curator for Africana Studies. She is the author of numerous articles and chapters and co-editor (with Miguel Juarez) of Where are all the Librarians of Color? The Experiences of People of Color in Academia (2016).

Hankins is a Regent for Exam Development for the Academy of Certified Archivists. She was honored as a 2016 Fellow of the Society of American Archivists for her services to the archival profession and the Society. She is one of the editors of Islam and Science Fiction project.

In December 2016, President Obama appointed Hankins as a member of the National Historical Publications and Records Commission.
